= Atlanta Braves Radio Network =

American baseball radio network

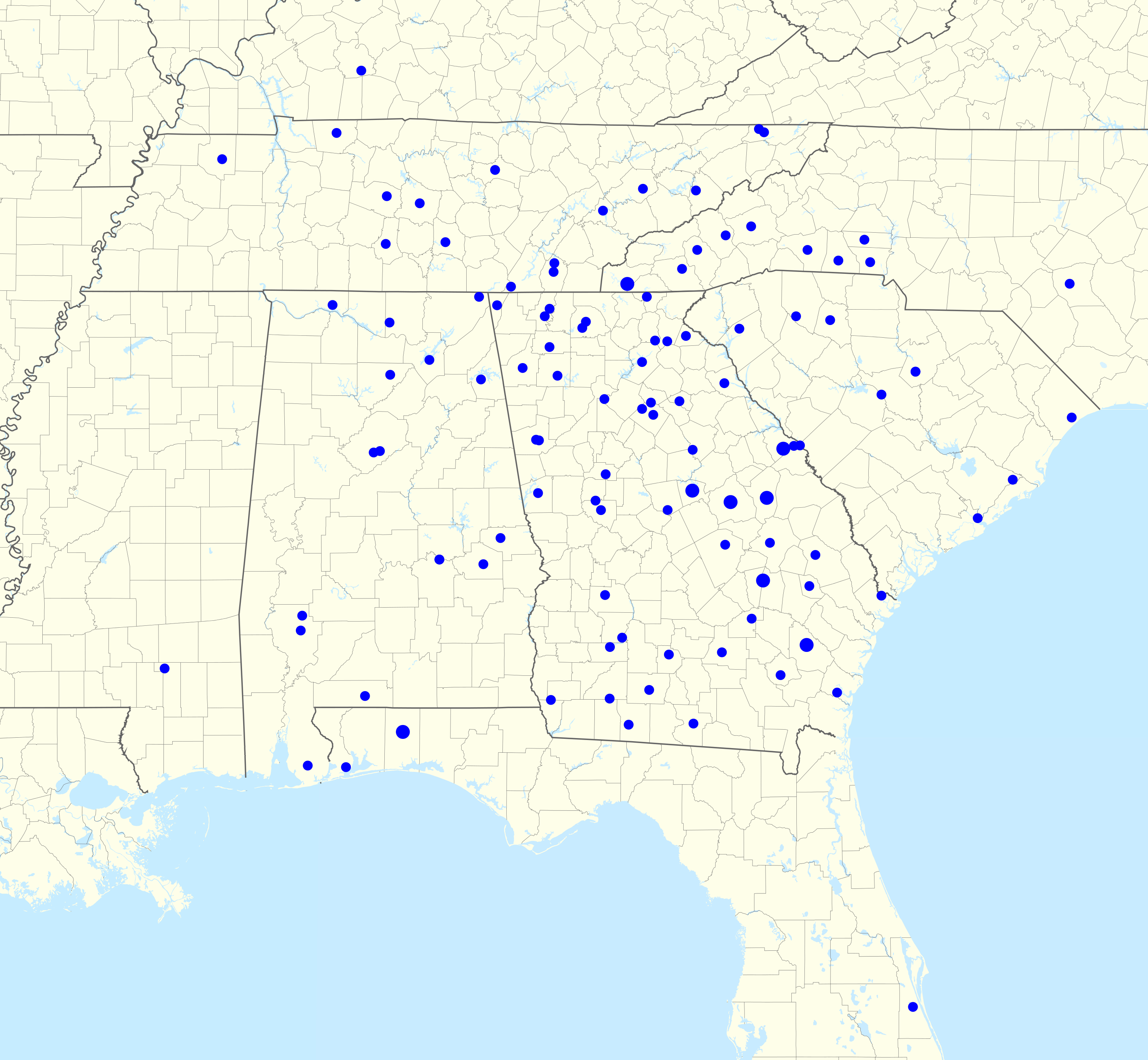
Map of radio affiliates in 2015

The Atlanta Braves Radio Network is a 171-station network (66 AM stations, 39 FM stations, 62 FM translators and four HD channels) with terrestrial coverage in 11 states Southeastern United States that airs Major League Baseball games of the Atlanta Braves. The flagship station is WCNN in Atlanta, Georgia. The primary booth announcers are Ben Ingram and Joe Simpson, who alternate between play-by-play and color commentary on most game broadcasts. Chris Dimino and Barrett Sallee host the pregame and postgame shows. The engineer and game producer for Braves Network broadcasts is Jonathan Chadwick. Network producers include Joe Virgin, Cullen Madden, David Holloway, Lucas Kochevar, and Chris Thames.

Due to the large geographic span of the Braves' territory, their radio network has the most affiliates of any team in Major League Baseball. The nearest teams to the north of Atlanta are the Cincinnati Reds, Washington Nationals, and the Baltimore Orioles. The nearest teams to the west are the St. Louis Cardinals, Houston Astros, and Texas Rangers, while the nearest teams to the south are the Tampa Bay Rays and Miami Marlins.

WCNN's audio stream carries all Atlanta Braves radio broadcasts nationally with no blackouts.

== Affiliates ==
| City/market | State | Station | Frequency | Network status |
|---|---|---|---|---|
| Auburn | Alabama | WAUD | 1230 AM | Affiliate |
| Auburn | Alabama | W266BJ | 101.1 FM | WAUD relay |
| Birmingham | Alabama | WJOX | 690 AM | Affiliate |
| Birmingham | Alabama | WJOX-FM | 94.5 FM | Affiliate |
| Brewton | Alabama | WKNU | 106.3 FM | Affiliate |
| Bridgeport | Alabama | WJTW | 1480 AM | Affiliate |
| Cullman | Alabama | WKUL | 92.1 FM | Affiliate |
| Florence | Alabama | WYTK | 93.9 FM | Affiliate |
| Foley | Alabama | WHEP | 1310 AM | Affiliate |
| Foley | Alabama | W223AX | 92.5 FM | WHEP relay |
| Guntersville | Alabama | WTWX | 95.9 FM | Affiliate |
| Helena–Birmingham | Alabama | WJQX | 100.5 FM | Affiliate |
| Huntsville | Alabama | WZZN | 97.7 FM | Affiliate |
| Oxford–Anniston | Alabama | WTAZ | 1580 AM | Affiliate |
| Scottsboro | Alabama | WWIC | 1050 AM | Affiliate |
| Sylacauga | Alabama | WFEB | 1340 AM | Affiliate |
| Sylacauga | Alabama | W265DV | 100.9 FM | WFEB relay |
| Thomasville | Alabama | WJDB-FM | 95.5 FM | Affiliate |
| Troy | Alabama | WTBF | 970 AM | Affiliate |
| Troy | Alabama | W242DA | 96.3 FM | WTBF relay |
| Crestview | Florida | WJSB | 1050 AM | Affiliate |
| Crestview | Florida | W266DF | 101.1 FM | WJSB relay |
| Fort Walton Beach | Florida | WAAZ-FM | 104.7 FM | Affiliate |
| Marianna | Florida | WTOT | 980 AM | Affiliate |
| Marianna | Florida | W271DM | 102.1 FM | WTOT relay |
| Panama City | Florida | WGSX | 104.3 FM | Affiliate |
| Port St. Joe | Florida | WVLQ | 101.9 FM | Affiliate |
| Atlanta | Georgia | WCNN | 680 AM | Flagship |
| Atlanta | Georgia | W229AG | 93.7 FM | WCNN relay |
| Adairsville | Georgia | W269CC | 101.7 FM | WJTH relay |
| Albany | Georgia | WALG | 1590 AM | Affiliate |
| Albany | Georgia | W257ED | 99.3 FM | WALG relay |
| Americus | Georgia | WISK | 98.7 FM | Affiliate |
| Athens | Georgia | WRFC | 960 AM | Affiliate |
| Blackshear | Georgia | WFNS | 1350 AM | Affiliate |
| Blackshear | Georgia | W253CI | 98.5 FM | WFNS relay |
| Brunswick | Georgia | WSFN | 790 AM | Affiliate |
| Brunswick | Georgia | W279BC | 103.7 FM | WSFN relay |
| Calhoun | Georgia | WJTH | 900 AM | Affiliate |
| Carrollton | Georgia | WLBB | 1330 AM | Affiliate |
| Carrollton | Georgia | WBTR-FM | 92.1 FM | Affiliate |
| Carrollton | Georgia | W292EW | 103.7 FM | WBTR-FM relay |
| Cartersville | Georgia | WBHF | 1450 AM | Affiliate |
| Cartersville | Georgia | W262CD | 100.3 FM | WBHF relay |
| Claxton | Georgia | WCLA | 1470 AM | Affiliate |
| Claxton | Georgia | W229AJ | 93.7 FM | WCLA relay |
| Columbus | Georgia | WLTC-HD2 | 103.7-2 FM | Affiliate |
| Columbus | Georgia | W288CV | 105.5 FM | WLTC-HD2 relay |
| Cornelia | Georgia | WCON-FM | 99.3 FM | Affiliate |
| Dalton | Georgia | WBLJ | 1230 AM | Affiliate |
| Dalton | Georgia | WYYU | 104.5 FM | Affiliate |
| Dalton | Georgia | WDAL | 1430 AM | Affiliate |
| Dalton | Georgia | W252CR | 98.3 FM | WDAL relay |
| Donalsonville | Georgia | WGMK | 106.3 FM | Affiliate |
| Douglas | Georgia | WPNG | 101.9 FM | Affiliate |
| Dublin | Georgia | WDBG | 103.1 FM | Affiliate |
| Dublin | Georgia | W271CI | 102.1 FM | WDBG relay |
| Ellijay | Georgia | WPGY | 1580 AM | Affiliate |
| Ellijay | Georgia | W229CE | 93.7 FM | WPGY relay |
| Ellijay | Georgia | WLJA-FM | 101.1 FM | Affiliate |
| Fort Valley | Georgia | WXKO | 1150 AM | Affiliate |
| Gainesville | Georgia | WGGA | 1240 AM | Affiliate |
| Gainesville | Georgia | W233CO | 94.5 FM | WGGA relay |
| Greensboro | Georgia | WDDK | 103.9 FM | Affiliate |
| Griffin | Georgia | WKEU | 1450 AM | Affiliate |
| Griffin | Georgia | W272DM | 102.3 FM | WKEU relay |
| Hiawassee | Georgia | WJUL | 1230 AM | Affiliate |
| Hiawassee | Georgia | W249DB | 97.7 FM | WJUL relay |
| Jesup | Georgia | WLOP | 1370 AM | Affiliate |
| Jesup | Georgia | WIFO-FM | 105.5 FM | Affiliate |
| La Grange | Georgia | WTRP | 620 AM | Affiliate |
| La Grange | Georgia | W255DP | 98.9 FM | WTRP relay |
| Louisville | Georgia | WPEH | 1420 AM | Affiliate |
| Louisville | Georgia | WPEH-FM | 92.1 FM | Affiliate |
| Macon | Georgia | W226BZ | 93.1 FM | WXKO relay |
| Metter | Georgia | WBMZ | 1360 AM | Affiliate |
| Metter | Georgia | W255AT | 98.9 FM | WBMZ relay |
| Milledgeville | Georgia | WMVG | 1450 AM | Affiliate |
| Milledgeville | Georgia | W283CZ | 104.5 FM | WMVG relay |
| Monroe | Georgia | WKUN | 1490 AM | Affiliate |
| Monroe | Georgia | W273DL | 102.5 FM | WKUN relay |
| Moultrie | Georgia | WMTM | 1300 AM | Affiliate |
| Moultrie | Georgia | W286BO | 105.1 FM | WMTM relay |
| Mount Vernon | Georgia | WYUM | 101.7 FM | Affiliate |
| Pelham | Georgia | WQLI | 92.3 FM | Affiliate |
| Pinehurst | Georgia | WCEH-FM | 98.3 FM | Affiliate |
| Rochelle | Georgia | WWKM | 93.1 FM | Affiliate |
| Rome | Georgia | WLAQ | 1410 AM | Affiliate |
| Rome | Georgia | W245DG | 96.9 FM | WLAQ relay |
| Sandersville | Georgia | WSNT-FM | 99.9 FM | Affiliate |
| Savannah | Georgia | WSEG | 1400 AM | Affiliate |
| Savannah | Georgia | W282AR | 104.3 FM | WSEG relay |
| Swainsboro | Georgia | WJAT | 800 AM | Affiliate |
| Swainsboro | Georgia | W259AK | 99.7 FM | WJAT relay |
| Thomaston | Georgia | WTGA-FM | 101.1 FM | Affiliate |
| Thomasville | Georgia | WPAX | 1240 AM | Affiliate |
| Thomasville | Georgia | W279BD | 103.7 FM | WPAX relay |
| Trenton | Georgia | WKWN | 1420 AM | Affiliate |
| Trenton | Georgia | W267CX | 101.3 FM | WKWN relay |
| Trenton | Georgia | W291CF | 106.1 FM | WJTW relay |
| Valdosta | Georgia | WJEM | 1150 AM | Affiliate |
| Valdosta | Georgia | W232DB | 94.3 FM | WJEM relay |
| Vidalia | Georgia | WVOP | 970 AM | Affiliate |
| Warner Robins | Georgia | W290BD | 105.9 FM | WXKO relay |
| West Point | Georgia | WRLA | 1490 AM | Affiliate |
| West Point | Georgia | W222CT | 92.3 FM | WRLA relay |
| Winder | Georgia | WJBB | 1300 AM | Affiliate |
| Winder | Georgia | W296CX | 107.1 FM | WJBB relay |
| Jeffersonville | Indiana | WXVW | 1450 AM | Affiliate |
| Jeffersonville | Indiana | W241CK | 96.1 FM | WXVX relay |
| Greenville | Kentucky | WPDQ | 91.3 FM | Affiliate |
| Jackson | Mississippi | WYAB | 103.9 FM | Affiliate |
| Pascagoula | Mississippi | WPMO | 1580 AM | Affiliate |
| Asheville | North Carolina | WPEK | 880 AM | Affiliate |
| Asheville | North Carolina | W225CJ | 92.9 FM | WPEK relay |
| Charlotte | North Carolina | WZGV | 730 AM | Affiliate |
| Charlotte | North Carolina | W248CO | 97.5 FM | WZGV relay |
| Cherryville | North Carolina | WCSL | 1590 AM | Affiliate |
| Cherryville | North Carolina | W225DL | 92.9 FM | WCSL relay |
| Lincolnton | North Carolina | WLON | 1050 AM | Affiliate |
| Lincolnton | North Carolina | W298CK | 107.5 FM | WLON relay |
| Rutherfordton | North Carolina | WCAB | 590 AM | Affiliate |
| Rutherfordton | North Carolina | W265DW | 100.9 FM | WCAB relay |
| Shelby | North Carolina | WOHS | 1390 AM | Affiliate |
| Shelby | North Carolina | W268CU | 101.5 FM | WOHS relay |
| Waynesville | North Carolina | WMXF | 1400 AM | Affiliate |
| Abbeville | South Carolina | WZLA-FM | 92.9 FM | Affiliate |
| Camden | South Carolina | WPUB-FM | 102.7 FM | Affiliate |
| Charleston | South Carolina | W234CV | 94.7 FM | WTMZ relay |
| Clemson | South Carolina | W205CU | 90.5 FM | WSNW relay |
| Clemson | South Carolina | WCCP-FM | 104.9 FM | Affiliate |
| Clinton | South Carolina | WPCC | 1410 AM | Affiliate |
| Clinton | South Carolina | W243DU | 96.5 FM | WPCC relay |
| Columbia | South Carolina | WNKT | 107.5 FM | Affiliate |
| Dorchester Terrace–Brentwood | South Carolina | WTMZ | 910 AM | Affiliate |
| New Ellenton | South Carolina | WGUS-FM | 102.7 FM | Affiliate |
| Walterboro | South Carolina | WOEZ | 93.7 FM | Affiliate |
| Union | South Carolina | WBCU | 1460 AM | Affiliate |
| Seneca | South Carolina | WSNW | 1150 AM | Affiliate |
| Seneca | South Carolina | W231BX | 94.1 FM | WSNW relay |
| Brentwood–Nashville | Tennessee | WNSR | 560 AM | Affiliate |
| Brentwood | Tennessee | W240CA | 95.9 FM | WNSR relay |
| Calhoun | Tennessee | WCLE-FM | 104.1 FM | Affiliate |
| Chattanooga | Tennessee | WFLI | 1070 AM | Affiliate |
| Chattanooga | Tennessee | W241AF | 96.1 FM | WFLI relay |
| Chattanooga | Tennessee | W262DQ | 100.3 FM | WFLI relay |
| Clarksville | Tennessee | WNZE | 1400 AM | Affiliate |
| Clarksville | Tennessee | W288DQ | 105.5 FM | WNZE relay |
| Cleveland | Tennessee | WCLE | 1570 AM | Affiliate |
| Cleveland | Tennessee | W256DQ | 99.1 FM | WCLE relay |
| Cleveland | Tennessee | W267BI | 101.3 FM | WCLE relay |
| Decatur | Tennessee | WQMT | 93.9 FM | Affiliate |
| Lenoir City | Tennessee | WLIL | 730 AM | Affiliate |
| Lenoir City | Tennessee | W274BZ | 102.7 FM | WLIL relay |
| Lewisburg | Tennessee | WJJM | 1490 AM | Affiliate |
| Lewisburg | Tennessee | W223CY | 92.5 FM | WJJM relay |
| Manchester | Tennessee | WMSR | 1320 AM | Affiliate |
| Manchester | Tennessee | W300BL | 107.9 FM | WMSR relay |
| Memphis | Tennessee | KWAM | 990 AM | Affiliate |
| Memphis | Tennessee | W300DE | 107.9 FM | KWAM relay |
| Murfreesboro | Tennessee | WGNS | 1450 AM | Affiliate |
| Murfreesboro | Tennessee | W263AI | 100.5 FM | WGNS relay |
| Murfreesboro | Tennessee | W270AF | 101.9 FM | WGNS relay |
| Newport | Tennessee | WLIK | 1270 AM | Affiliate |
| Newport | Tennessee | W250BR | 97.9 FM | WLIK relay |
| Pigeon Forge | Tennessee | WPFT | 106.3 FM | Affiliate |
| Smyrna | Tennessee | W300DO | 107.9 FM | WNSR relay |
| Tullahoma | Tennessee | W294CV | 106.7 FM | WMSR relay |
| Portland | Tennessee | WQKR | 1270 AM | Affiliate |
| Portland | Tennessee | W269DQ | 101.7 FM | WQKR relay |
| Richmond | Virginia | WURV-HD2 | 103.7-2 FM | Affiliate |
| Richmond | Virginia | W291CL | 106.1 FM | WURV-HD2 relay |
| Roanoke | Virginia | WFJX | 910 AM | Affiliate |
| Roanoke | Virginia | W282CK | 104.3 FM | WFJX relay |

== Former flagships ==
| Station | Frequency | Location |
|---|---|---|
| WNAC | 1260 AM | Boston (1925-1936 and 1941-1946 and 1951-1952) |
| WAAB | 1440 AM | Worcester (1937-1941) |
| WMEX | 1510 AM | Boston (1946) |
| WHDH | 850 AM | Boston (1947-1950) |
| WEMP | 1340 AM | Milwaukee (1953-1954) |
| WEMP | 1250 AM | Milwaukee (1955-1965) |
| WTMJ | 620 AM | Milwaukee (1953-1962 and 1965) |
| WSB | 750 AM | Atlanta (1966-1991 and 1995-2004) |
| WGST | 640 AM | Atlanta (1992-1994 and 2005-2009) |

== See also ==
- List of Sirius XM Radio channels
