= List of ESPN Radio affiliates =

The following is a list of full-power radio stations and HD Radio subchannels in the United States broadcasting ESPN Radio programming, which can be sorted by their call signs, frequencies, city of license, state and brandings.

Gray background indicates an HD Radio subchannel.

Call sign	Frequency	City of license	State	Branding
WGZZ-HD3	94.3-3 FM	Auburn	AL	ESPN
WJOX	690 AM	Birmingham	AL	Jox 690
WWTM	1400 AM	Decatur	AL	ESPN Radio 1400
WYTK	93.9 FM	Florence	AL	ESPN Radio 93.9
KCBF	820 AM	Fairbanks	AK	820 Sports
KSLD	1140 AM	Soldotna	AK	ESPN 1140
KVNA	600 AM	Flagstaff	AZ	ESPN 104.7 FM / AM 600
KTAR	620 AM	Phoenix	AZ	ESPN 620
KMVP-FM	98.7 FM	Phoenix	AZ	Arizona Sports 98.7
KFFN	1490 AM	Tucson	AZ	ESPN Radio 1490 The Fan
KAKS	99.5 FM	Fayetteville	AR	ESPN Radio 99.5
KTTG	96.3 FM	Fort Smith	AR	ESPN Radio 96.3
KABZ	103.7 FM	Little Rock	AR	103.7 The Buzz
KLAA	830 AM	Anaheim	CA	Angels Radio AM 830
KGEO	1230 AM	Bakersfield	CA	ESPN Radio 1230
KFPT	790 AM	Clovis	CA	ESPN Radio 790
KATA	1340 AM	Eureka	CA	ESPN Radio 92.7 / 1340
KFIG	1430 AM	Fresno	CA	1430 ESPN Radio
KSPN	710 AM	Los Angeles	CA	ESPN LA 710
KIFM	1320 AM	West Sacramento	CA	ESPN 1320 AM
KXTK	1280 AM	San Luis Obispo	CA	ESPN Radio 1280
KAVP	1450 AM	Colona	CO	ESPN Radio 1450
KEPN	1600 AM	Denver	CO	1600 ESPN
KKFN	104.3 FM	Denver	CO	Denver Sports 104.3 The Fan
KIUP	930 AM	Durango	CO	ESPN Radio 930
WSBN	630 AM	Washington	DC	ESPN 630 D.C.
WRUF	850 AM	Gainesville	FL	ESPN Radio 98.1/850
WOKV	690 AM	Jacksonville	FL	ESPN 690
WGSX	104.3 FM	Panama City	FL	104.3 ESPN Northwest Florida
WESP	106.3 FM	West Palm Beach	FL	ESPN Radio 106.3
WRFC	960 AM	Athens	GA	960 The Ref
WCNN	680 AM	Atlanta	GA	680 The Fan
WIFN	1340 AM	Atlanta	GA	ESPN Atlanta 103.7
WSFN	790 AM	Brunswick	GA	ESPN Coastal Georgia
WIOL-FM	95.7 FM	Columbus	GA	95.7 ESPN
WXKO	1150 AM	Fort Valley	GA	Middle Georgia's ESPN
WCEH-FM	98.3 FM	Pinehurst	GA	Middle Georgia's ESPN
WSEG	1400 AM	Savannah	GA	ESPN Savannah
WFNS	1350 AM	Waycross	GA	ESPN Okefenokee
KKEA	1420 AM	Honolulu	HI	ESPN Radio 1420
KMVI	900 AM	Kahului	HI	ESPN Radio 900
KRPL	1400 AM	Moscow	ID	The Palouse's ESPN 1400
WSJK	93.5 FM	Champaign	IL	ESPN Radio 93.5
WMVP	1000 AM	Chicago	IL	ESPN Chicago 1000
WXLT	103.5 FM	Marion	IL	ESPN Radio 103.5
WFMB	1450 AM	Springfield	IL	Sportsradio 1450
WREF	97.7 FM	Evansville	IN	ESPN 97.7 The Ref
WFNI	1070 AM	Indianapolis	IN	1070 The Fan
WIBC-HD2	93.1-2 FM	Indianapolis	IN	93.5/107.5 The Fan
WIBC-HD3	93.1-3 FM	Indianapolis	IN	93.5/107.5 The Fan
WIOU	1350 AM	Kokomo	IN	News/Talk/ESPN 1350AM WIOU
WASK	101.7 FM	Lafayette	IN	101.7 The Hammer
WMRI	860 AM	Marion	IN	ESPN Radio 860
WKBV	1490 AM	Richmond	IN	ESPN Radio 1490 and 100.9FM
WAOV	97.7 FM	Vincennes	IN	97.7 WAOV
KGYM	1600 AM	Cedar Rapids	IA	1600 ESPN
KRNT	1350 AM	Des Moines	IA	1350 ESPN
KKGQ	92.3 FM	Wichita	KS	ESPN Radio 92.3
WCMI	1340 AM	Ashland	KY	ESPN Radio 1340
WWKU	102.7 FM	Bowling Green	KY	ESPN Radio 102.7
WLXG	1300 AM	Lexington	KY	ESPN Radio 1300/92.5
WHBE	680 AM	Louisville	KY	ESPN Radio 680 and 105.7
WHBE-FM	105.7 FM	Louisville	KY	ESPN Radio 680 and 105.7
WLME	102.7 FM	Owensboro	KY	102.7 The Game
KDBS	1410 AM	Alexandria	LA	ESPN Radio 1410
WNXX	104.9 FM	Baton Rouge	LA	ESPN Radio 104.9
KLWB-FM	103.7 FM	Lafayette	LA	ESPN 103.7
KLCJ	104.1 FM	Lake Charles	LA	ESPN 104.1
WEZQ	92.9 FM	Bangor	ME	92.9 The Ticket
WPEI	95.9 FM	Saco–Portland	ME	FM 95.9 WPEI
WCMD	1230 AM	Cumberland	MD	ESPN Radio 1230
WVFN	730 AM	East Lansing	MI	The Game 730
KBUN	1450 AM	Bemidji	MN	ESPN Radio 1450
KSTP	1500 AM	Minneapolis	MN	1500 ESPN Twin Cities
WBHR	660 AM	St. Cloud	MN	ESPN Radio 660
WRKS	105.9 FM	Jackson	MS	ESPN The Zone 105.9 FM
KGIR	1220 AM	Cape Girardeau	MO	ESPN Radio 1220
KTGR	1580 AM	Columbia	MO	100.5FM 105.1FM KTGR
KTGR-FM	100.5 FM	Fulton	MO	100.5FM 105.1FM KTGR
KBTC	1250 AM	Houston	MO	ESPN 1250 Houston
WHB	810 AM	Kansas City	MO	Sports Radio 810
WXOS	101.1 FM	St. Louis	MO	101 ESPN
KMAL	1470 AM	Sikeston	MO	ESPN Radio 1470
KBFL	1060 AM	Springfield	MO	ESPN The Jock
KBLG	910 AM	Billings	MT	ESPN 910
KKVU-HD3	104.5-3 FM	Missoula	MT	102.9 ESPN Missoula
KICS	1550 AM	Hastings	NE	ESPN Radio 1550
KXPN	1460 AM	Kearney	NE	ESPN Radio 1460
WOW	590 AM	Omaha	NE	WOW AM 590
KWWN	1100 AM	Las Vegas	NV	ESPN Radio 1100
KHIT	1450 AM	Reno	NV	ESPN Radio 94.1 FM/1450 AM
WENJ	97.3 FM	Atlantic City	NJ	97.3 ESPN-FM
KQTM	101.7 FM	Albuquerque	NM	ESPN Radio 101.7
KAMQ	1240 AM	Carlsbad	NM	ESPN Radio 1240
KVSF	1400 AM	Santa Fe	NM	ESPN Radio 1400
WTMM-FM	104.5 FM	Albany	NY	ESPN Radio 104.5 The Team
WBBF	1120 AM	Buffalo	NY	ESPN Buffalo AM 1120 & 98.9 FM
WPIE	1160 AM	Ithaca	NY	ESPN Ithaca
WHSQ	880 AM	New York	NY	ESPN New York 880
WEPN	1050 AM	New York	NY	ESPN Radio 1050
WSLB	1400 AM	Ogdensburg	NY	ESPN Radio 1400
WSGO	1440 AM	Oswego	NY	ESPN Radio 1440/100.1
WTLA	1200 AM	Syracuse	NY	ESPN Radio 97.7/1200
WRNY	1310 AM	Utica	NY	ESPN Radio 1310
WPEK	880 AM	Asheville	NC	ESPN Asheville
WZGV	730 AM	Charlotte	NC	ESPN Radio 730
WECU	1570 AM	Greenville	NC	ESPN Greenville
WWNB	1490 AM	New Bern	NC	ESPN New Bern
WCMC-FM	99.9 FM	Raleigh–Durham	NC	99.9 FM The Fan
WMXF	1400 AM	Waynesville	NC	ESPN Asheville
WMFD	630 AM	Wilmington	NC	ESPN Radio 630
KNFL	740 AM	Fargo	ND	740 The Fan
KKXL	1440 AM	Grand Forks	ND	1440 The Fan
WFUN	970 AM	Ashtabula	OH	ESPN 970 WFUN
WTIG	990 AM	Massillon	OH	ESPN 990
WCKY	1530 AM	Cincinnati	OH	ESPN 1530
WKNR	850 AM	Cleveland	OH	850 ESPN Cleveland
WING	1410 AM	Dayton	OH	ESPN Radio 1410
WFOB	1430 AM	Fostoria	OH	ESPN Radio 1430
WWSR	93.1 FM	Lima	OH	93.1 The Fan
WRGM	1440 AM	Mansfield	OH	ESPN Radio 1440/97.3
WJAW	630 AM	Marietta	OH	ESPN Radio 630
KVSO	1240 AM	Ardmore	OK	ESPN Radio 1240
KWPN	640 AM	Oklahoma City	OK	ESPN Radio 640
KRSK-FM	105.1 FM	Mollala	OR	105.1 The Fan
KMTT	910 AM	Portland	OR	910 ESPN Portland
KRSK	1080 AM	Portland	OR	105.1 The Fan
KCUP	1230 AM	Toledo	OR	1230 ESPN Radio
WHGB	1400 AM	Harrisburg	PA	ESPN 95.3 & 1400
WPEN	97.5 FM	Philadelphia	PA	97.5 The Fanatic
WTMZ-FM	98.9 FM	Charleston	SC	ESPN 98.9
KTOQ	1340 AM	Rapid City	SD	ESPN Radio 1340 & 105.7
KVTK	1570 AM	Vermillion	SD	ESPN Radio 1570
WKFN	540 AM	Clarksville	TN	ESPN Radio 540
WTJF	1390 AM	Jackson	TN	Sports Radio 94FM 1390am
WTJF-FM	94.3 FM	Jackson	TN	Sports Radio 94FM 1390am
WKPT	1400 AM	Johnson City	TN	ESPN Radio 1400
WMFS	680 AM	Memphis	TN	680 ESPN
WMFS-FM	92.9 FM	Memphis	TN	92.9 ESPN
WPRT-FM	102.5 FM	Nashville	TN	102.5 The Game
KBPA-HD2	103.5-2 FM	Austin	TX	ESPN 102.7
KGAS	1590 AM	Carthage	TX	ESPN Radio 1590
KZNE	1150 AM	College Station	TX	Sports Radio 1150 The Zone
KROD	600 AM	El Paso	TX	ESPN Radio 600
KGVL	1400 AM	Greenville	TX	ESPN 1400
KFNC	97.5 FM	Houston	TX	ESPN Radio 97.5
KTTU	950 AM	Lubbock	TX	100.7 The Score
KTTU-FM	97.3 FM	Lubbock	TX	Double T 97.3
KITX-HD4	95.5-4 FM	Paris	TX	ESPN Paris 105.1
KGKL	960 AM	San Angelo	TX	ESPN Radio 960
KTFM	94.1 FM	San Antonio	TX	San Antonio's Sports Star
KZDC	1250 AM	San Antonio	TX	ESPN 1250
KTFS	740 AM	Texarkana	TX	ESPN 105.9
KSEY	1230 AM	Vernon	TX	ESPN 1230
KRZI	1660 AM	Waco	TX	ESPN Central Texas
KALL	700 AM	Salt Lake City	UT	ESPN 700 Sports
KOVO	960 AM	Provo	UT	ESPN 960 Sports
WHBG	1360 AM	Harrisonburg	VA	ESPN Radio 106.9 & 1360
WURV-HD2	103.7-2 FM	Richmond	VA	ESPN Radio 106.1
WTON	1240 AM	Staunton	VA	ESPN Radio 1240
WVSP-FM	94.1 FM	Virginia Beach	VA	Priority Audio Sports Radio 94.1
KWOK	1490 AM	Aberdeen	WA	ESPN Radio 1490
KPUG	1170 AM	Bellingham	WA	ESPN Radio 1170
KJOX	1340 AM	Kennewick	WA	1340 ESPN Radio
KRPL	1400 AM	Pullman	WA	The Palouse's ESPN 1400
KIRO	710 AM	Seattle	WA	Seattle Sports 710
KXLX	700 AM	Spokane	WA	700 ESPN Spokane
WSWW	1490 AM	Charleston	WV	ESPN Radio 1490
WMTD-FM	102.3 FM	Hinton	WV	ESPN Radio 102.3
WRVC	930 AM	Huntington	WV	ESPN Radio 930
WKLP	1390 AM	Keyser	WV	ESPN Radio 1390
WVOW	1290 AM	Logan	WV	ESPN Radio 1290-101.9
WEPM	1340 AM	Martinsburg	WV	ESPN Radio 1340
WJAW	630 AM	St Marys	WV	ESPN Radio 630
WBEV	1430 AM	Beaver Dam	WI	ESPN 1430 AM
WFBZ	105.5 FM	La Crosse	WI	ESPN 105.5 FM
WTLX	100.5 FM	Madison	WI	100.5 FM ESPN
WMAM	570 AM	Marinette	WI	ESPN Radio 570
WIGM	1490 AM	Medford	WI	ESPN Radio 1490
WKTI	94.5 FM	Milwaukee	WI	94.5 ESPN Milwaukee
WPVL	1590 AM	Platteville	WI	ESPN Radio 1590
WKLJ	1290 AM	Sparta	WI	ESPN 1290
WOSQ	92.3 FM	Spencer	WI	ESPN Radio 92.3
KRAE	1480 AM	Cheyenne	WY	ESPN Radio 1480
KVOW	1450 AM	Riverton	WY	ESPN Radio 1450

== Canada ==
ESPN owns a minority interest in the sports network TSN alongside its majority owner Bell Media: in 2011, the company converted four of its stations to a new sports radio network known as TSN Radio. Much like its television counterpart, all four TSN Radio stations also carry programs from ESPN Radio (such as select event coverage, along with overnight and weekend programming).

Call sign	Frequency	Market	Branding
CFGO	1200 AM	Ottawa, Ontario	TSN Radio 1200
CHUM	1050 AM	Toronto, Ontario	TSN Radio 1050
CKGM	690 AM	Montreal, Quebec	TSN Radio 690
