= Atlanta Falcons =

NFL team in Atlanta, Georgia, U.S.

- Current season
Logo	Wordmark
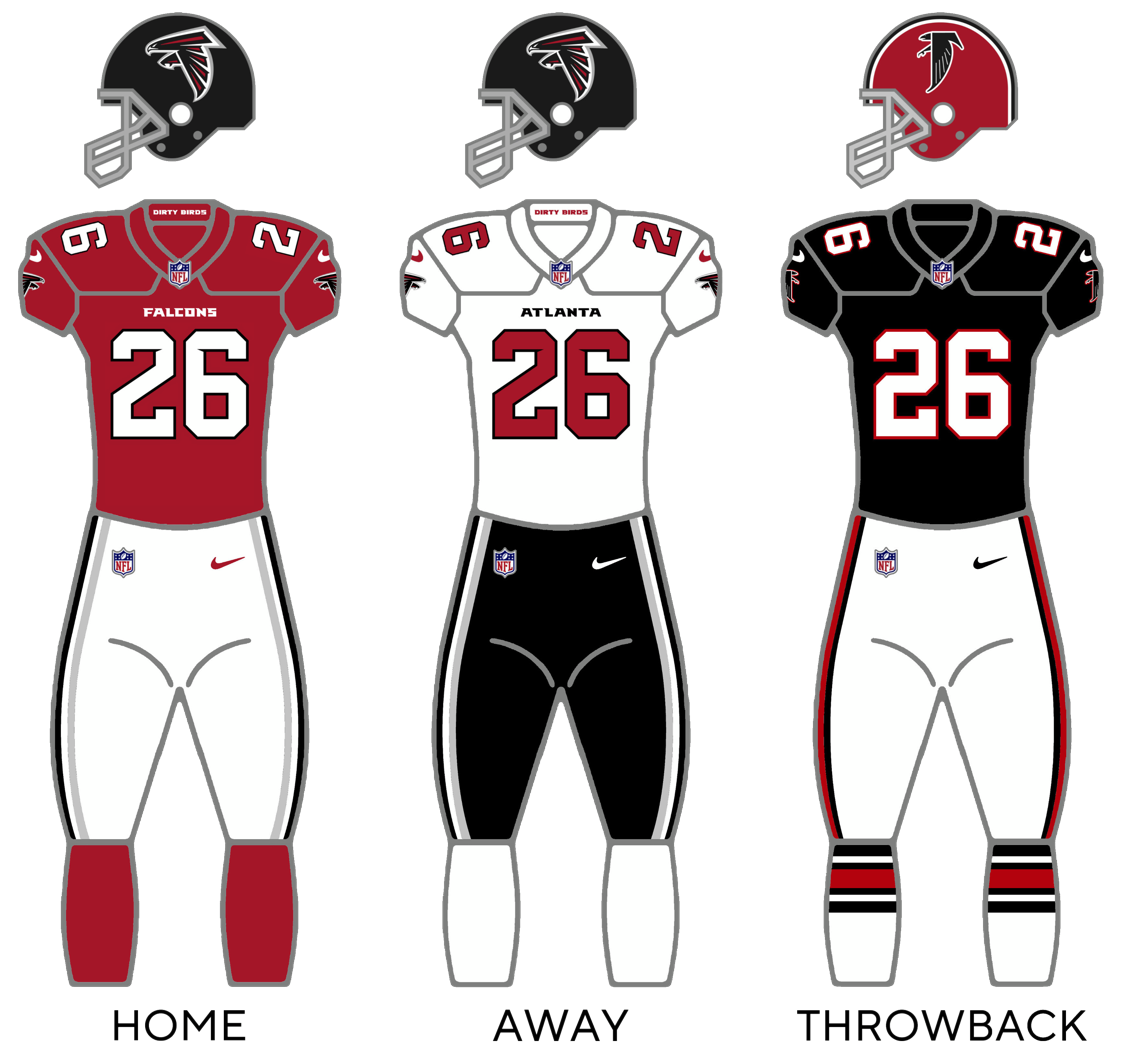
- Uniforms

General information
- Founded: June 30, 1965; 61 years ago
- Stadium: Mercedes-Benz Stadium; Atlanta, Georgia
- Headquartered: Flowery Branch, Georgia
- Colors: Red, black, silver, white
- Mascot: Freddie Falcon
- Website: atlantafalcons.com

Personnel
- Owner: Arthur Blank
- General manager: Ian Cunningham
- Head coach: Kevin Stefanski
- President: Greg Beadles

Nicknames
- The Dirty Birds; Grits Blitz (1977 defense)

Team history
- Atlanta Falcons (1966–present)

Home fields
- Atlanta–Fulton County Stadium (1966–1991); Georgia Dome (1992–2016); Mercedes-Benz Stadium (2017–present)

League / conference affiliations
- National Football League (1966–present): Eastern Conference (1966); Western Conference (1967–1969); Coastal Division (1967–1969); National Football Conference (1970–present); NFC West (1970–2001); NFC South (2002–present)

Championships
- Conference championships: 2: NFC: 1998, 2016
- Division championships: 6: NFC West: 1980, 1998; NFC South: 2004, 2010, 2012, 2016

Playoff appearances (14)
- NFL: 1978, 1980, 1982, 1991, 1995, 1998, 2002, 2004, 2008, 2010, 2011, 2012, 2016, 2017

Owners
- Rankin M. Smith Sr. (1965–1989); Taylor Smith (1989–2002); Arthur Blank (2002–present)

The Atlanta Falcons are a professional American football team based in Atlanta, Georgia, United States. The Falcons compete in the National Football League (NFL) as a member of the National Football Conference (NFC) South division. The Falcons were founded on June 30, 1965, and joined the NFL in 1966 as an expansion team, after the NFL offered then-owner Rankin Smith a franchise to keep him from joining the rival American Football League (AFL).

In their 59 years of existence, the Falcons have compiled a record of 398–512–6 (398–512–6 in the regular season and 10–14 in the playoffs), winning division championships in 1980, 1998, 2004, 2010, 2012, and 2016. The Falcons have appeared in two Super Bowls, the first during the 1998 season in Super Bowl XXXIII, where they lost to the Denver Broncos 34–19, and the second 18 years later, a 34–28 overtime loss to the New England Patriots in Super Bowl LI. They are the oldest major professional sports team in America with no championships.

The Falcons' current home field is Mercedes-Benz Stadium, which opened for the 2017 season; the team's headquarters and practice facilities are located at a 50-acre (20 ha) site in Flowery Branch, northeast of Atlanta in Hall County.

== History ==
=== Professional football comes to Atlanta (1962) ===
Professional football first came to Atlanta in 1962, when the American Football League (AFL) staged two preseason contests, with one featuring the Denver Broncos vs. the Houston Oilers and the second pitting the Dallas Texans against the Oakland Raiders. Two years later, the AFL held another exhibition, this time with the New York Jets taking on the San Diego Chargers.

In 1965, after the Atlanta–Fulton County Stadium (then known simply as Atlanta Stadium) was built, the city of Atlanta felt the time was right to start pursuing professional football. One independent group which had been active in NFL exhibition promotions in Atlanta applied for franchises in both the AFL and NFL, acting entirely on its own with no guarantee of stadium rights. Another group reported it had deposited earnest money for a team in the AFL.

With everyone running in different directions, some local businessmen (Cox Broadcasting) worked out a deal and were awarded an AFL franchise on June 8, contingent upon acquiring exclusive stadium rights from city officials. NFL Commissioner Pete Rozelle, who had been moving slowly in Atlanta matters, was spurred by the AFL interest and headed on the next plane down to Atlanta to block the rival league's claim on the city of Atlanta. He forced the city to make a choice between the two leagues; by June 30, the city picked Rankin Smith and the NFL.

The AFL's original expansion plans in June 1965 were for two new teams in 1966, in Atlanta and Philadelphia. It later evolved into the Miami Dolphins in 1966 and the Cincinnati Bengals in 1968. The NFL had planned to add two teams in 1967; the competition with the AFL for Atlanta forced the first to be added a year early in 1966. The odd number of teams (15) resulted in one idle team (bye) each week, with each team playing 14 games over 15 weeks (similar to 1960: 12 games over 13 weeks). The second expansion team, the New Orleans Saints, joined the NFL as planned in 1967 as its sixteenth franchise.

The Atlanta Falcons franchise began when it was approved to begin play in 1966 by a unanimous vote of the NFL club owners on June 21, 1965. Rozelle granted ownership nine days later on June 30 to 40-year-old Rankin Smith Sr., an executive vice president of Life Insurance Company of Georgia. He paid $8.5 million, the highest price in NFL history at the time for a franchise. Rozelle and Smith made the deal in about five minutes and the Atlanta Falcons brought the largest and most popular sport to the city of Atlanta.

The Atlanta expansion team became the 15th NFL franchise, and they were awarded the first overall pick in the 1966 NFL draft as well as the final pick in each of the first five rounds. They selected consensus All-American linebacker Tommy Nobis from the University of Texas, making him the first-ever Falcon. The league also held the expansion draft six weeks later in which Atlanta selected unprotected players from the 14 existing franchises. Although the Falcons selected many good players in those drafts, they still were not able to win right away.

The Atlanta team received its nickname on August 29, 1965. Miss Julia Elliott, a school teacher from Griffin, was singled out from many people who suggested "Falcons" as the nickname for the new franchise. She wrote: "the Falcon is proud and dignified, with great courage and fight. It never drops its prey. It is deadly and has a great sporting tradition."

=== Smith family era (1966–2001) ===
The Falcons' inaugural season was in 1966, and their first preseason game was on August 1, a loss to the Philadelphia Eagles. Under head coach Norb Hecker, Atlanta lost their first nine regular-season games in 1966; their first victory came on the road against the struggling New York Giants on November 20 in Yankee Stadium. Two weeks later, Atlanta won at Minnesota, and beat St. Louis in Atlanta the next week for their first home win. The team finished with a 1–12–1 record the next year, with the only win coming in Week 7 in a 21–20 win over the Minnesota Vikings in 1967. After a 0–3 start to the 1968 season, Hecker was dismissed. Norm Van Brocklin finished out the season as head coach with a 2–9 record. Van Brocklin continued to coach the team the next season. The team improved to a 6–8 record in 1969.

The Falcons had their first Monday Night Football game in Atlanta during the 1970 season, a 20–7 loss to the Miami Dolphins. The team went 4–8–2 in 1970. The only two winning seasons in their first 12 years were 1971 (7–6–1) and 1973 (9–5).

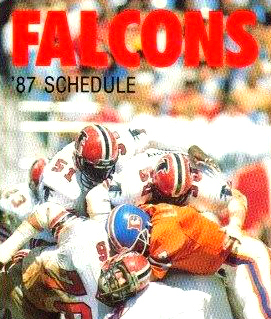
The Falcons' defense taking on Denver Broncos quarterback John Elway during a 1985 game.

In the 1978 season, the 9–7 Falcons qualified for the playoffs for the first time and won the Wild Card game against the Eagles 14–13. The following week, they lost to the Dallas Cowboys 27–20 in the Divisional Playoffs. The 1979 team regressed to a 6–10 record.

In the 1980 season, after a nine-game winning streak, the Falcons posted a franchise then-best record of 12–4 and captured their first NFC West division title. The next week, their dream season ended at home with a loss to the Cowboys 30–27 in the divisional playoffs. In the strike-shortened 1982 season, the 5–4 Falcons made the playoffs but lost to the Minnesota Vikings, 30–24. Falcons coach Leeman Bennett was fired after the loss. The team then had losing seasons for the next eight years. Dan Henning was hired prior to the 1983 season.

In the 1989 NFL draft, the Falcons selected cornerback Deion Sanders in the first round, who helped them for the next four years, setting many records for the franchise. "Neon Deion" (a.k.a. "Prime Time") had a flashy appeal and helped bring media attention to one of the league's most anonymous franchises. Sanders was also famous for playing on major league baseball teams (New York Yankees and the Atlanta Braves) while simultaneously playing in the NFL.

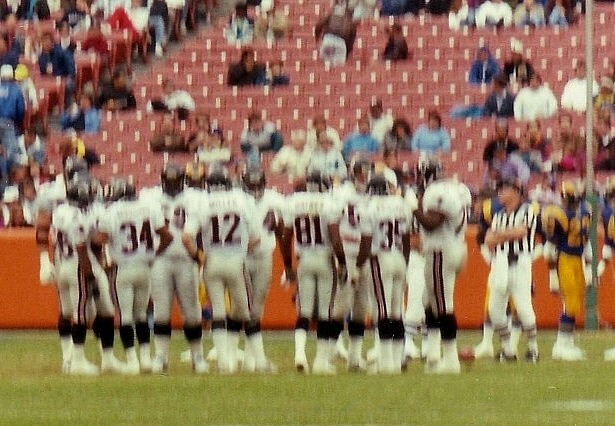
The Falcons playing against the Los Angeles Rams during a 1991 away game.

After defeating the New Orleans Saints in the NFC Wild Card game, the Falcons' 1991 season ended in a divisional playoff loss to the Washington Redskins. In the 1991 NFL draft, the Falcons selected quarterback Brett Favre as the 33rd overall pick. During his rookie season, he played in two games where he amassed a record of four passing attempts with no receptions and two interceptions. The following February, Favre was traded to the Green Bay Packers.

In 1992, the Atlanta Falcons opened a new chapter in their history moving into the newly constructed Georgia Dome, where the team has defeated all 31 other NFL teams at least once during its time there.

==== Dan Reeves years (1997–2003) ====
In 1998, under recently acquired head coach Dan Reeves, quarterback Chris Chandler and running back Jamal Anderson the "Dirty Bird" Falcons had their greatest season to date. On November 8, they beat the New England Patriots 41–10, ending a streak of 22 losses at cold-weather sites. The team finished with a franchise-best 14–2 regular-season record and the NFC West division championship. On January 17, 1999, the Falcons upset the top-seeded Vikings at the Hubert H. Humphrey Metrodome in the NFC Championship Game 30–27, in an exciting overtime victory. However, in their first-ever Super Bowl appearance, they lost 34–19 to the defending champion Denver Broncos in Super Bowl XXXIII.

In the second game of the Falcons 1999 season, running back Jamal Anderson, who had been a key player in the Falcons' 1998 success, suffered a season-ending knee injury. The Falcons finished the season with a very disappointing 5–11 regular-season record. In 2000, the Falcons suffered through another horrendous season finishing 4–12 and once again missing the playoffs.

In the 2001 NFL draft, the Falcons orchestrated a trade with the San Diego Chargers, acquiring the first overall pick (which was used on quarterback Michael Vick) in exchange for wide receiver-return specialist Tim Dwight and the fifth overall pick (used on running back LaDainian Tomlinson).

The Falcons finished the 2001 season with a record of 7–9 and missed the playoffs. Jessie Tuggle retired following 14 seasons in Atlanta.

=== Arthur Blank era (2002–present) ===
On December 6, 2001, billionaire Home Depot co-founder Arthur M. Blank reached a preliminary agreement with the Falcons' Taylor Smith to purchase the team for a reported $545 million. In a special meeting prior to Super Bowl XXXVI in New Orleans on February 2, 2002, NFL owners voted unanimously to approve the deal.

The 2002 season saw the Falcons return to the playoffs with a regular-season record of 9–6–1, tying the Pittsburgh Steelers. It was Vick's first year as the starter, and the team, with newly acquired running back Warrick Dunn, delivered the Green Bay Packers their first home playoff loss ever with a 27–7 result in the Wild Card Round. A 20–6 loss to the Donovan McNabb-led Philadelphia Eagles the following week, however, ended the Falcons' season.

On March 19, 2003, the Falcons presented their new logo. During the 2003 preseason Vick broke his leg and missed the first 12 games of the season. After losing 7 straight games, the decision was made to fire head coach Dan Reeves. Wade Phillips acted as interim coach for the final three games. Although the Falcons won 3 of their last 4 games after the return of Vick, they ended up with a 5–11 record that year.

==== Jim Mora years (2004–2006) ====
In 2004, a new head coach, Jim L. Mora, was hired and Vick returned for the full season. The Falcons went 11–5, winning their third division title and earning a first-round bye into the playoffs. In the divisional playoffs, the Falcons defeated the St. Louis Rams, 47–17, in the Georgia Dome, advancing to the NFC Championship Game, which they lost to the Eagles, 27–10.

The Falcons again fell short of achieving back-to-back winning seasons in 2005, going 8–8. In 2006, Michael Vick became the first quarterback in league history to rush for more than 1,000 yards in a season, with 1,039. After finishing the season 7–9, however, coach Jim Mora was dismissed.

==== Bobby Petrino ====
Bobby Petrino, the University of Louisville's football coach, replaced Mora. Before the 2007 season began, Vick was suspended indefinitely by the NFL after pleading guilty to charges involving dog fighting in the state of Virginia. On December 10, 2007, Vick received a 23-month prison sentence and was officially cut from the Atlanta roster.

For the 2007 season, the Falcons were forced to start Joey Harrington at quarterback. On December 11, 13 games into his first NFL season as head coach, Bobby Petrino resigned without notice to coach at the University of Arkansas, leaving the beleaguered players only a note in the locker room. Secondary Coach Emmitt Thomas was named interim coach for the final three games of the season on December 12. The Falcons ended the year with a dismal 4–12 record.

After the tumultuous and disappointing 2007 season, the Falcons made a number of moves, hiring a new general manager and head coach, drafting a new starting quarterback, and signing a starting running back.

==== Mike Smith years (2008–2014) ====
On January 13, 2008, the Falcons named former Patriots director of college football scouting Thomas Dimitroff General Manager. On January 23, Jacksonville Jaguars defensive coach and former linebackers coach for the 2000 Super Bowl champion Baltimore Ravens Mike Smith was named the Falcons' new head coach. Chargers back-up running back Michael Turner agreed to a 6-year, $30 million deal on March 2. On April 26, Matt Ryan (quarterback from Boston College) was drafted third overall in the 2008 NFL draft by the Falcons.

The Falcons finished the 2008 regular season with a record of 11–5, and the #5 seed in the playoffs. On December 21, 2008, Atlanta beat the Minnesota Vikings 24–17 to clinch a wild card spot, earning a trip to the playoffs for the first time since 2004. The Falcons would go on to lose in the wild-card round of the 2008 NFL playoffs to the eventual NFC champion Arizona Cardinals, 30–24.

Matt Ryan started all 16 games in his rookie season and was named the Associated Press Offensive Rookie of the Year. First-year head coach Mike Smith was named 2008 NFL Coach of the Year.

Although they failed to make the playoffs in 2009 the team rallied to win their final three regular-season games to record back-to-back winning seasons for the first time in franchise history. The Falcons defeated the Tampa Bay Buccaneers 20–10 in the final game of the season to improve their record to 9–7.

In 2010, with a regular-season record of 13–3, the Falcons secured a third straight winning season, their fourth overall divisional title, and the top overall seed in the NFC playoffs; however, the Falcons were overpowered by the eventual Super Bowl XLV champion Green Bay Packers in the NFC Divisional Playoffs 48–21. The Falcons scored 414 points – the fifth-most in franchise history. The team sent an NFL-high and franchise-best nine players to the 2011 Pro Bowl.

The Falcons made a surprise trade up with the Cleveland Browns in the 2011 NFL draft to select Alabama wide receiver Julio Jones sixth overall. In exchange, the Falcons gave up their first-, second- and fourth-round draft picks in 2011, and their first and fourth draft picks in 2012. Jones, along with teammates Tony Gonzalez and Roddy White, have since been dubbed Atlanta's "Big Three" (based on their total number of reception yards). On August 30, 2011, Sports Illustrated senior writer Peter King, who correctly predicted the 2011 Super Bowl, made his predictions for the 2011 season and picked the Falcons to defeat the San Diego Chargers in the 2012 Super Bowl. The Falcons finished the season at 10–6, securing the fifth seed after a Week 17 beatdown of Tampa Bay in which the Falcons pulled their starters after leading 42–0 just 23 minutes into the game.

The Falcons then went on to play the New York Giants in a 2011 NFC Wild Card Game at MetLife Stadium in East Rutherford, New Jersey. The first half was a defensive struggle, with the first points coming off of a safety by the Falcons, giving Atlanta a 2–0 lead. In the second quarter, though, Eli Manning connected with Hakeem Nicks for a short touchdown pass to make it 7–2 Giants heading into the second half. Then the Giants took control, as Manning threw for two more touchdown passes to Mario Manningham and Nicks and the defense completed its shutout of the Falcons to give the New York Giants the win, 24–2, and the Falcons their third straight playoff loss with Matt Ryan and Mike Smith. After the season, defensive coordinator Brian VanGorder accepted a coaching job at Auburn University, and the offensive coordinator Mike Mularkey took the head coaching job in Jacksonville.

Atlanta exploded out of the gate, going a franchise-best 8–0 and remaining the last unbeaten team in the NFL that year. Their hopes to get an undefeated season came to an end with a 27–31 loss to the division rival Saints. Julio Jones had a remarkable second year, grabbing 10 touchdowns and 1,198 yards. The Falcons finished the season 13–3, and clinched the number one seed in the NFC playoffs.

The Falcons played the Seattle Seahawks in their first playoff game. Although they went down 28–27 with only 31 seconds left on the clock, Matt Ryan led the team to their first playoff victory, 30–28. It was the only playoff victory in the Mike Smith era.

The Atlanta Falcons then advanced to face the San Francisco 49ers. The Falcons seized control of the game early with a Matt Bryant field goal, a trio of Matt Ryan touchdown passes caught by Julio Jones and Tony Gonzalez coupled with outstanding defensive play. By the end of the half, the score was 24–14. The tides of the game began to shift in the second half as the 49ers rallied back with a pair of Frank Gore touchdown runs. Atlanta's offense attempted to reply but were ultimately shut down by the 49er defense. A few series later, late in the 4th quarter with little time remaining, Atlanta found themselves in a 4th and 4 situation at the 10-yard line. The Falcons needed just 10 more yards to secure victory and advance to their first Super Bowl berth in 14 years. Matt Ryan fired a pass to Roddy White which was ultimately broken up by inside linebacker NaVorro Bowman, resulting in a 28–24 defeat.

Following the success of the previous season, the Falcons were an expected Super Bowl contender. However, injuries hampered the team's performance and the team finished the season 4–12. With that, the streak of consecutive winning seasons came to an end and Mike Smith had his first losing season as a head coach. Tony Gonzalez, in his final season in the NFL, was selected to the 2014 Pro Bowl as a starter representing Team Rice. Following the conclusion of the 2012 season, director of player personnel Les Snead departed the team to join the St. Louis Rams and Dave Caldwell, assistant to general manager Thomas Dimitroff, left the team to join the Jacksonville Jaguars. Scott Pioli, former GM of the Kansas City Chiefs, was announced as the Falcons' new assistant GM. Mike Smith was given a one-year extension on his contract as head coach. The Falcons had the 6th overall pick in the 2014 NFL draft with which they selected Jake Matthews, who played as offensive tackle for Texas A&M.

Despite having another rough season, the Falcons still had an opportunity to qualify for the playoffs at the end of the regular season. The Falcons hosted the Carolina Panthers in their regular season finale, with the winners clinching the NFC South division. Unfortunately, the Falcons lost in a 34–3 blowout as Matt Ryan threw two interceptions that were returned for touchdowns and got sacked six times. The Falcons finished the season 6–10, marking the second consecutive losing season for the team. The following day, Mike Smith was fired after seven seasons as head coach. The Falcons would soon hire Seattle Seahawks defensive coordinator Dan Quinn as the team's 16th head coach. The Falcons had the 8th overall pick in the 2015 NFL draft with which they selected Vic Beasley, a defensive end from Clemson University.

==== Dan Quinn years (2015–2020) ====
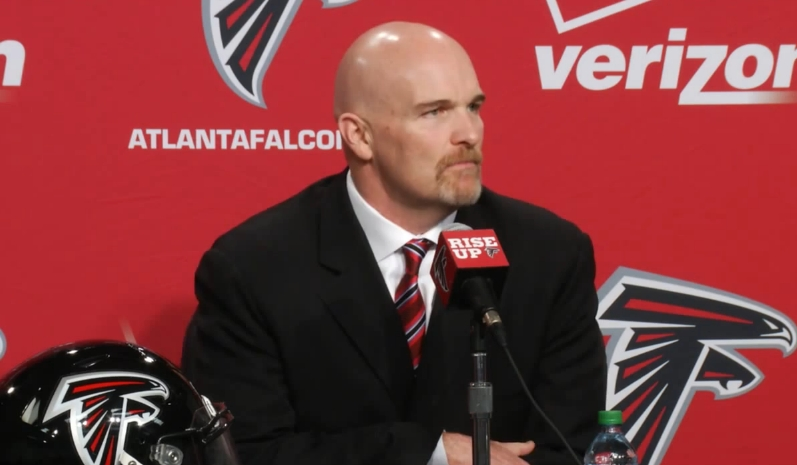
Dan Quinn

In February 2015, the team was investigated by the NFL for alleged use of artificial crowd noise in the Georgia Dome. The Falcons lost a 2016 NFL draft selection as a result of the league's investigation.

Dan Quinn's first season saw a 5–0 start, the team's best start in four years. They would then struggle throughout the rest of the season by losing 8 of their last 11 games, resulting in an 8–8 record in the 2015 season. They did, however, give the Panthers their only regular-season loss. The Falcons used their first-round pick in the 2016 NFL draft on safety Keanu Neal from the University of Florida.

In the Falcons' 25th and final season in the Georgia Dome, Atlanta lost their week 1 game to the Buccaneers 24–31. The Falcons would then win their next four including one over the Panthers, when the franchise set new records: Matt Ryan threw for 503 yards, and Julio Jones caught 12 passes for 300 yards. Beating the San Francisco 49ers 41–13 in Week 15, the Falcons improved to 9–5 and secured their first winning season since 2012. One week later, the Falcons defeated the Panthers in Charlotte, North Carolina, and clinched their first NFC South division title since 2012. In their last regular-season game at the Georgia Dome, the Falcons defeated the New Orleans Saints, and secured an 11–5 record and a first-round bye.

In the divisional round of the playoffs, Atlanta defeated the Seahawks 36–20 in the Georgia Dome, and hosted their last game at the Georgia Dome against the Green Bay Packers in the NFC Championship Game on January 22, 2017. The Falcons defeated the Packers 44–21 to advance to Super Bowl LI as the NFC champions. Atlanta was up 28–3 late in the third quarter, and the New England Patriots scored 31 unanswered points, with the last 6 in the first-ever overtime in the Super Bowl. The Patriots' 25-point comeback was the largest in Super Bowl history.

In 2016, the Falcons scored 540 points in the regular season, the seventh-most in NFL history, tied with the Greatest Show on Turf (the 2000 St. Louis Rams). However, the Falcons defense gave up 406 points, 27th in the league.

The Falcons moved into their new home, the Mercedes-Benz Stadium, this season. Their first game ever played at the new stadium was a preseason loss to the Arizona Cardinals. The first regular-season game at the new stadium was a rematch of the 2016–17 NFC Championship, with Atlanta defeating Green Bay 34–23. Their first loss of the season was a 23–17 home defeat to the Buffalo Bills in week 4. The team returned to the playoffs with a 10–6 record (albeit with a third-place finish in the NFC South). The Falcons defeated the Los Angeles Rams 26–13 in the Wild Card round, but their 2017 season came to an end a week later in the Divisional Playoff round at the hands of the eventual Super Bowl champion Philadelphia Eagles 15–10. The 2018 and 2019 seasons saw the Falcons go 7–9 and miss the postseason both years.

In their first game with new uniforms, the Falcons lost to the Seattle Seahawks at home 38–25. The Falcons then suffered comebacks made by both the Cowboys on the road (39–40) and then back in Atlanta against the Bears (26–30). On October 11, after the team suffered a 23–16 loss at home against the Carolina Panthers and fell to 0–5, the Falcons announced the firings of Quinn and Dimitroff. Defensive coordinator Raheem Morris took over for the rest of the season, leading the team to a 4–12 record. Morris was not retained after the season, and soon joined the Los Angeles Rams as their defensive coordinator.

==== Arthur Smith years (2021–2024) ====
On January 15, 2021, the Falcons announced that Tennessee Titans offensive coordinator Arthur Smith had been named the 18th head coach in franchise history. Four days later, New Orleans Saints executive Terry Fontenot was named the Falcons' new general manager. Tight end Kyle Pitts was selected with the 4th pick of the 2021 draft, and longtime star receiver Julio Jones was traded to the Titans, after publicly requesting a trade from Atlanta. The Falcons improved on their record from the prior year, finishing the season with a 7–10 record.

On March 21, 2022, the Falcons traded longtime star quarterback Matt Ryan to the Indianapolis Colts. During the 2022 season, the team finished last place in the NFC South with a 7–10 record.

The Falcons entered the 2023 seasons with heightened expectations after drafting Texas running back Bijan Robinson with the eighth overall pick of the 2023 draft and making significant improvements in free agency, including signing Jessie Bates and Calais Campbell to improve their defense. However, the team finished with a 7–10 record for the third consecutive season, although they had been in contention for a playoff spot until the final day of the season before a 48–17 loss to the New Orleans Saints on January 7, 2024. The following day, Smith was fired after three years as head coach.

==== Raheem Morris years (2024–2025) ====
On January 25, 2024, the Falcons announced Raheem Morris's return to the organization, this time as the 19th head coach in Falcons history. During the early months of his tenure, Morris faced scrutiny and criticism for his questionable player selection decisions. Morris was fired on January 4, 2026, after two seasons as head coach.

==== Kevin Stefanski years (2026–present) ====
On January 17, 2026, the Falcons announced that former Cleveland Browns head coach Kevin Stefanski had been named the 20th head coach in franchise history.

== Stadiums ==
The Falcons have called three stadiums home in their 59 years of existence, and its third home in their history opened in the late summer of 2017. The first was the Atlanta–Fulton County Stadium, sharing with the Atlanta Braves Major League Baseball team until 1991. In 1992, the Georgia Dome was built, and the Falcons played there from its opening to the 2016 season. The Dome has been frequently used for college football, including Georgia State football and college bowl games such as the Peach Bowl.

In an effort to replace the aging Georgia Dome and potentially host a future Super Bowl, team owner Arthur Blank proposed a deal with the city of Atlanta to build a new state-of-the-art stadium not far from where the Georgia Dome is located. Blank will contribute $800 million and the city of Atlanta will contribute an additional $200 million via bonds backed by the city's hotel/motel tax towards the construction of a retractable roof stadium. Blank will contribute additional money for cost overruns if it is needed. The team will provide up to $50 million towards infrastructure costs that weren't included in the construction budget and to retire the remaining debt on the Georgia Dome. In addition, Blank's foundation and the city will each provide $15 million for development in surrounding neighborhoods. Though the total cost of the stadium was initially estimated to be around $1 billion, the total cost was revised to $1.5 billion according to Blank. In March 2013, the Atlanta City Council voted 11–4 in favor of building the stadium. The retractable roof Mercedes-Benz Stadium broke ground in May 2014, and became the third home stadium for the Falcons and the first for the new Atlanta United FC Major League Soccer club upon opening in 2017.

== Logo and uniforms ==
Falcons uniform: 1971–1977

Falcons uniform: 1997–2002

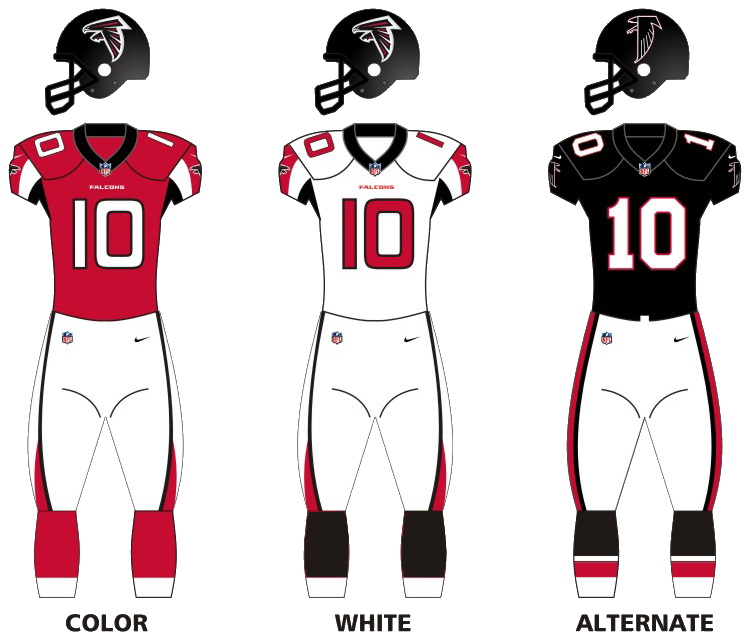
Falcons uniform: 2016–19, including the throwback edition

The Atlanta Falcons' colors are black, red, silver and white. When the team began play in 1966, the Falcons wore red helmets with a black falcon crest logo. In the center of the helmet was a center black stripe surrounded by two gold stripes and two white stripes. Those original colors represented the Georgia Bulldogs' red and black and the Georgia Tech Yellow Jackets' white and gold. Although the gold was removed after several seasons, the white remains to this day. They wore white pants and either black or white jerseys. At first, the falcon crest logo was also put on the jersey sleeves, but it was replaced by a red and white stripe pattern four years later; the falcon crest returned on the sleeves in 1978. They switched from black to red jerseys in 1971, and the club began to wear silver pants in 1978, while also changing the numbers on the white uniform from black to red. The facemasks on the helmets were initially gray, becoming white in 1978, and then black in 1984; the team wore black face masks until its 2020 redesign.

A prototype white helmet was developed for the team prior to the 1974 season, but was never worn.

In 1990, the uniform design changed to black helmets, silver pants, and either black or white jerseys. The numbers on the white jerseys were black, but were changed to red in 1997. (The red numerals could be seen on the away jerseys briefly in 1990.)

Both the logo and uniforms changed in 2003. The logo was redesigned with red and silver accents to depict a more powerful, aggressive falcon, which now more closely resembles the capital letter F.

Although the Falcons still wore black helmets, the new uniforms featured jerseys and pants with red trim down the sides. The uniform design consisted of either black or white jerseys, and either black or white pants. During that same year, a red alternate jersey with black trim was also introduced. The Falcons also started wearing black cleats with these uniforms.

In 2004, the red jerseys became the primary jerseys, and the black ones became the alternate, both worn with white pants. In select road games, the Falcons wear black pants with white jerseys. The Falcons wore an all-black combination for home games against their archrivals, the New Orleans Saints, winning the first two contests (24–21 in 2004 and 36–17 in 2005), but losing 31–13 in 2006. The Falcons wore the all-black combination against the New Orleans Saints for four straight seasons starting in 2004, With the last time being in 2007, losing 34–14. They wore the combination again in 2006, against the Tampa Bay Buccaneers in Week 2. The Falcons won that game, 14–3. The Falcons also wore their all-black uniform in 2007 against the New York Giants, and in 2008 against the Carolina Panthers and against the Tampa Bay Buccaneers (for the second time). After that, the black pants and uniforms were retired and the white pants were now used full-time with the regular uniforms.

In the 1980s, the Falcons wore their white uniforms at home most of the time because of the heat. When the Falcons started playing in a dome, the team switched to their dark uniforms for home games but have worn their white uniforms at home a few times since switching to the dome. It was announced at the 2009 state of the franchise meeting that the Falcons would wear 1966 throwback uniforms for a couple games during the 2009 season. The Atlanta Falcons wore 1966 throwback jerseys for two home games in 2009 – against the Carolina Panthers on September 20 and against the Tampa Bay Buccaneers on November 29. The Falcons won both of those games. They donned the throwbacks again for 2 games in 2010, against Baltimore and San Francisco, winning both of those games as well. The throwbacks were used twice in 2011 and 2012; both times were against the Panthers and Saints. However, the throwbacks were retired following a 2013 NFL rule requiring only one helmet shell per team.

The Falcons unveiled an all-red Color Rush uniform on September 13, 2016; however, due to the fact that the Falcons and the Tampa Bay Buccaneers had similar all-red Color Rush uniforms, the Falcons were unable to wear their Color Rush uniform until the 2017 season.

Also in 2016, the Falcons unveiled a mixed throwback uniform set. The uniform tops, pants and socks closely resembled their 1960s kits. From 2016 to 2021, due to the NFL's one-shell rule, the Falcons wore the black helmets with the original logo decal similar to the design they wore in the 1990s. However, starting in 2022, with the NFL now reinstating the use of alternate helmets, the Falcons brought back the original red helmets to pair with their throwback uniforms.

It was revealed in January 2020 that the Falcons will change uniforms for the 2020 NFL season. The ensuing design featured the return to black as the primary home uniform color for the first time since 2003. Both the primary home and road uniforms featured the "ATL" abbreviation in red above either white or black numbers with red drop shadows. The white and black tops are usually paired with either white or black pants. The alternate uniform featured a red/black gradient design and also featured the "ATL" abbreviation in white above white numbers with black drop shadows. Black pants are only used with this uniform. All three uniforms feature red side stripes. The current throwback uniform was also retained. In addition, the Falcons switched to matte helmets with the enlarged falcon logo and gray facemasks. The red/black gradient alternates only lasted three seasons before it was removed from the uniform rotation in 2023. Red pants and socks were also unveiled as part of the rebrand, but the Falcons never wore them in game.

The Falcons announced they will unveil new uniforms ahead of the 2026 NFL season. The new design brought back red as the primary color along with design elements taken from their earlier uniforms. Silver accents were added to the pant striping. The throwback uniform which the team has been wearing since 2022 with the red helmets was retained.

== Rivalries ==
=== Divisional ===
==== New Orleans Saints ====
The Falcons have shared a heated divisional rivalry with the New Orleans Saints (first the NFC West, and now the NFC South). The two teams were often basement-dwellers in the division; but the rivalry grew as a means of pride between the two cities, as they were the only two NFL teams in the Deep South for multiple decades. The series is the oldest and most iconic rivalry in the NFC South as the two teams have long harbored bad blood against one another. The Falcons currently lead the series 58-56.

==== Carolina Panthers ====
In addition, the Falcons share a similar, rivalry with the Carolina Panthers, with both teams having been in the NFC West from the Panthers' founding in 1995 to the NFL realignment in 2002. Similar to their rivalry with the Saints, the Falcons have often endured several competitive divisional battles with the Panthers for lead of the NFC South, though the two have yet to meet in the postseason. The series is also known as the "I-85 Rivalry" due to Atlanta and Charlotte being only four hours apart on Interstate 85. The Falcons lead the series 37-25.

==== Tampa Bay Buccaneers ====
The Falcons share a less-intense divisional rivalry with the Tampa Bay Buccaneers since the NFL realignment in 2002. The two had been regional opponents but very little had linked any further animosity towards the two as the Buccaneers played in the former NFC Central before the realignment. The two teams would find themselves competing over staff and players alike, particularly during the 2000s after the Falcons had lured general manager Rich McKay after winning Super Bowl XXXVII the season prior. McKay's ties with Tampa extend into his family as his father John McKay was head coach of the Buccaneers for nine seasons.

=== Conference ===
==== Philadelphia Eagles ====
The Eagles lead the Falcons 21–15–1, with a 3–1 lead in playoff games. The rivalry first emerged after the Falcons upset the Eagles 14–13 in the 1978 Wild Card Round, and only intensified further in the 2000s thanks to the rivalry between prominent dual-threat quarterbacks Donovan McNabb, and Michael Vick. Recently, the Falcons lost to the Eagles in the 2017 divisional round. The Falcons managed a win against Philly in week 2 en route to Philly's eventual Super Bowl LIX victory.

==== Green Bay Packers ====
The Falcons have also shared a playoff rivalry with the Green Bay Packers as much of the connections between the two teams stems from Atlanta trading future hall-of-fame quarterback Brett Favre to the Green Bay on February 11, 1992, in exchange for a first-round pick. The two teams have met four times in the postseason, most recently during the 2016–17 NFC Championship as it would also be the final game played at the Georgia Dome. The Packers lead the all-time series 19–16, while both teams are tied in the postseason 2–2.

== Statistics ==
=== Record vs. opponents ===
Includes postseason records

Source: Note: W = Wins, L = Losses, T = Ties

Team	W	L	T	Percent	Last result	Last date	Last locale	Postseason
St. Louis/Phoenix/Arizona Cardinals	17	16	0	.515	W 26–19	December 21, 2025	State Farm Stadium	0–1 postseason
Baltimore Ravens	2	4	0	.333	L 16–26	December 2, 2018	Mercedes-Benz Stadium	
Buffalo Bills	8	6	0	.571	W 24–14	October 14, 2025	Mercedes-Benz Stadium	
Carolina Panthers	38	20	0	.655	W 38–20	October 14, 2024	Bank of America Stadium	
Chicago Bears	14	15	0	.483	W 27–24	November 20, 2022	Mercedes-Benz Stadium	
Cincinnati Bengals	5	9	0	.357	L 36–37	September 30, 2018	Mercedes-Benz Stadium	
Cleveland Browns	4	12	0	.250	W 23–20	November 11, 2022	Mercedes-Benz Stadium	
Dallas Cowboys	12	17	0	.414	W 27–21	November 3, 2024	AT&T Stadium	0–2 postseason
Denver Broncos	7	8	0	.467	W 34–27	November 8, 2020	Mercedes-Benz Stadium	0–1 postseason
Detroit Lions	14	25	0	.359	W 20–16	December 26, 2021	Mercedes-Benz Stadium	
Green Bay Packers	16	17	0	.485	W 35–14	September 24, 2026	Lambeau Field	2–2 postseason
Houston Texans	3	3	0	.500	W 21–19	October 8, 2023	Mercedes-Benz Stadium	
Baltimore/Indianapolis Colts	2	15	0	.118	L 24–27	September 22, 2019	Lucas Oil Stadium	
Jacksonville Jaguars	5	3	0	.625	W 21–14	November 28, 2021	TIAA Bank Field	
Kansas City Chiefs	3	7	0	.300	L 14–17	December 27, 2020	Arrowhead Stadium	
San Diego/Los Angeles Chargers	8	3	0	.727	L 17–20	December 13, 2020	SoFi Stadium	
St. Louis/Los Angeles Rams	29	48	2	.380	W 27–24	December 29, 2025	Mercedes-Benz Stadium	2–0 postseason
Miami Dolphins	5	9	0	.357	W 30–28	October 24, 2021	Hard Rock Stadium	
Minnesota Vikings	11	19	0	.367	W 40–23	October 18, 2020	US Bank Stadium	1–1 postseason
New England Patriots	6	9	0	.400	L 0–25	November 18, 2021	Mercedes-Benz Stadium	0–1 postseason
New Orleans Saints	56	52	0	.519	W 45–24	October 5, 2026	Louisiana Superdome	1–0 postseason
New York Giants	15	11	0	.577	W 17–14	December 22, 2024	Mercedes-Benz Stadium	0–1 postseason
New York Jets	9	5	0	.643	W 13–8	December 3, 2023	MetLife Stadium	
Las Vegas/Oakland/Los Angeles Raiders	9	7	0	.563	W 15–9	December 16, 2024	Allegiant Stadium	
Philadelphia Eagles	15	18	1	.456	w 22-21	September 16, 2024	Lincoln Financial Field	1–3 postseason
Pittsburgh Steelers	2	14	1	.147	L 17–41	October 7, 2018	Heinz Field	
San Francisco 49ers	33	47	1	.414	W 29–20	October 25, 2026	Mercedes-Benz Stadium	1–1 postseason
Seattle Seahawks	7	12	0	.368	W 25–38	September 25, 2022	Lumen Field	2–0 postseason
Tampa Bay Buccaneers	31	29	0	.517	W 29-28	December 11, 2025	Raymond James Stadium	
Tennessee Titans/Houston Oilers	7	8	0	.467	L 10–24	September 29, 2019	Mercedes-Benz Stadium	
Washington Commanders	11	15	1	.426	W 34–27	September 28, 2025	Mercedes-Benz Stadium	0–1 postseason
Total	402	455	6	.469				10–14 (.417)

  - Notes International Series

=== Single game records ===
- Rushing: Michael Turner, 220 (September 7, 2008)
- Passing: Kirk Cousins, 509 (October 3, 2024)
- Passing touchdowns: Wade Wilson, 5 (December 13, 1992) and Matt Ryan, 5 (September 23, 2018)
- Receptions: William Andrews, 15 (September 15, 1981)
- Receiving yards: Julio Jones, 300 (October 2, 2016)
- Interceptions: Several Falcons, 2, most recently Jessie Bates, 2 (September 10, 2023)
- Field goals: Norm Johnson, 6 (November 13, 1994)
- Total touchdowns: T. J. Duckett, 4 (December 12, 2004) and Michael Turner, 4 (November 23, 2008)
- Points scored: T. J. Duckett, 24 (December 12, 2004) and Michael Turner, 24 (November 23, 2008)
- Sacks: Adrian Clayborn, 6 (November 13, 2017)

=== Single season records ===
- Passing attempts: 651 Matt Ryan (2013)
- Passing completions: 439 Matt Ryan (2013)
- Passing yards: 4,944 Matt Ryan (2016)
- Passing touchdowns: 38 Matt Ryan (2016)
- Passing interceptions: 25 Bobby Hebert (1996)
- Completion percentage: 69.9 Matt Ryan (2016)
- Passing rating: 117.1 Matt Ryan (2016)
- Rushing attempts: 410 Jamal Anderson (1998)
- Rushing yards: 1,846 Jamal Anderson (1998)
- Rushing touchdowns: 17 Michael Turner (2008)
- Receiving catches: 136 Julio Jones (2015)
- Receiving yards: 1,871 Julio Jones (2015)
- Receiving touchdowns: 15 Andre Rison (1993)
- Quarterback sacks: 16.5 John Abraham (2008)
- Pass interceptions: 10 Scott Case (1988)
- Field goal attempts: 40 Jay Feely (2002)
- Field goals made: 34 Matt Bryant (2016 and 2017)
- Points: 158 Matt Bryant (2016)
- Total touchdowns: 17 Michael Turner (2008)

=== Career records ===
- Passing attempts: 6,817 Matt Ryan (2008–2021)
- Passing completions: 4,460 Matt Ryan (2008–2021)
- Passing yards: 51,186 Matt Ryan (2008–2021)
- Passing touchdowns: 321 Matt Ryan (2008–2021)
- Passing interceptions: 147 Matt Ryan (2008–2021)
- Passing rating: 94.6 Matt Ryan (2008–2021)
- Rushing attempts: 1,587 Gerald Riggs (1982–1988)
- Rushing yards: 6,631 Gerald Riggs (1982–1988)
- Rushing yards by a QB: 3,859 Michael Vick (2001–2006)
- Rushing touchdowns: 60 Michael Turner (2008–2012)
- Receiving catches: 808 Roddy White (2005–2015)
- Receiving yards: 12,125 Julio Jones (2011–2020)
- Receiving touchdowns: 63 Roddy White (2005–2015)
- Quarterback sacks: 68.5 John Abraham (2006–2012)
- Pass interceptions: 39 Rolland Lawrence (1973–1980)
- Field goal attempts: 296 Matt Bryant (2009–2019)
- Field goals made: 224 Matt Bryant (2009–2019)
- Points: 1,163 Matt Bryant (2009–2019)
- Total touchdowns: 63 Roddy White (2005–2015)
- Pass interception return yards: 658 Rolland Lawrence (1973–1980)
- Pass interception returned for touchdowns: 4 Deion Jones (2016–2022)
- Punt return yards: 1,723 Allen Rossum (2002–2006)
- Kickoff return yards: 5,489 Allen Rossum (2002–2006)
- Longest punt: 75 John James (1972–1981) and Harold Alexander (1993–1994)
- Longest field goal: 59 Morten Andersen (1995–2000, 2006–2007) and Matt Bryant (2009–2019)

== Players ==
=== Current roster ===
Atlanta Falcons roster
Quarterbacks (QB): 13 Andy Dalton; 9 Michael Penix Jr.; 18 Jack Strand; 1 Tua Tagovailoa; Running backs (RB): 7 Bijan Robinson; 25 Khalil Herbert; Wide receivers (WR): 19 Chris Blair; 17 Zachariah Branch KR; 88 Beaux Collins; 4 Jahan Dotson; 5 Drake London; 14 Olamide Zaccheaus; Tight ends (TE): 81 Austin Hooper; 87 Nick Muse; 8 Kyle Pitts; 89 Charlie Woerner	Offensive linemen (OL): 65 Matthew Bergeron G; 68 Kyle Hinton G; 62 Corey Levin C/G; 63 Chris Lindstrom G; 70 Jake Matthews T; 75 Ethan Onianwa T; 71 Jawaan Taylor T; 74 Andrew Vorhees G; 73 Cameron Williams T; Defensive linemen (DL): 95 Gervon Dexter DT; 54 Brandon Dorlus DE; 96 Zach Harrison DE; 94 LaCale London DT; 27 James Pearce Jr. DE; 92 Maason Smith DT; 55 Za'Darius Smith DE; 47 Charles Snowden DE; 99 Cameron Thomas DE	Linebackers (LB): 22 Yasir Abdullah; 53 Kendal Daniels; 0 Divine Deablo; 45 Christian Harris; 56 Harold Perkins Jr.; 46 Josh Woods; Defensive backs (DB): 33 Billy Bowman Jr. CB; 29 Sydney Brown; 28 Mike Ford CB; 23 DeMarcco Hellams S; 26 C. J. Henderson CB; 21 Mike Hughes CB; 37 Robert Longerbeam CB; 24 A. J. Terrell CB; 12 Avieon Terrell CB; 31 Xavier Watts S; Special teams (ST): 16 Jake Bailey P; 49 Liam McCullough LS; 39 Jake Moody K	Practice squad: 86 Vinny Anthony WR; 41 Brian Asamoah LB; 61 Kam Dewberry G; 80 Dylan Drummond WR; 66 Gus Hartwig C; 30 Darnay Holmes CB; 51 Jared Ivey LB; 84 E. J. Jenkins TE; 76 Riley Mahlman T; 38 Jam Miller RB; 93 Zacch Pickens DT; 43 TJ Quinn LB; 34 Jammie Robinson S; 67 Josh Thompson G; 32 Delarrin Turner-Yell S; 82 Antwane Wells Jr. WR; Reserve: 40 JD Bertrand ILB (IR); 52 Samson Ebukam DE (IR); 90 Da'Shawn Hand DT (IR); 72 Michael Jerrell T (IR); 50 DeAngelo Malone OLB (PUP); 77 Storm Norton T (PUP); 15 Brian Robinson Jr. RB (IR); 44 Trey Sermon RB (IR); 98 Anterio Thompson DT (NF-Inj.); 11 Jalon Walker OLB (IR) 53 active, 16 practice squad, 10 reserve As of November 14, 2026. Rookies in italics.; Roster; Depth chart; Transactions

=== Pro Football Hall of Famers ===
Atlanta Falcons Hall of Famers
Players
No.	Name	Position	Tenure	Year inducted
8	Tommy McDonald	WR	1967	1998
29	Eric Dickerson	RB	1993	1999
21	Deion Sanders	CB	1989–1993	2011
56	Chris Doleman	DE	1994–1995	2012
87	Claude Humphrey	DE	1968–1978	2014
4	Brett Favre	QB	1991	2016
5	Morten Andersen	K	1995–2000; 2006–2007	2017
88	Tony Gonzalez	TE	2009–2013	2019
93	Dwight Freeney	DE	2016	2024
17	Devin Hester	KR/WR	2014–2015	2024
Coaches & Contributors
Name		Position(s)	Tenure	Inducted
Bobby Beathard		Scout	1968–1971	2018

Humphrey is the only person in the Hall of Fame who spent the majority of his career with the Falcons.

=== Ring of Honor ===
Fifteen members are included in the Atlanta Falcons Ring of Honor.

Atlanta Falcons Ring of Honor
No.	Player	Position	Tenure	Inducted
—	Arthur M. Blank	Owner	2002–present	2024
2	Matt Ryan	QB	2008–2021	2024
10	Steve Bartkowski	QB	1975–1985	2004
21	Deion Sanders	CB	1989–1993	2010
28	Warrick Dunn	RB	2002–2007	2017
31	William Andrews	RB	1979–1983, 1986	2004
42	Gerald Riggs	RB	1982–1988	2013
55	John Abraham	DE/LB	2006–2012	2026
57	Jeff Van Note	C	1969–1986	2006
58	Jessie Tuggle	LB	1987–2000	2004
60	Tommy Nobis	LB	1966–1976	2004
62	Todd McClure	C	1999–2012	2022
78	Mike Kenn	OT	1978–1994	2008
84	Roddy White	WR	2005–2015	2019
87	Claude Humphrey	DE	1968–1978	2008

=== Draft history ===
In the team's history, the Falcons have had the number one overall pick four times.

== Coaching staff ==
=== Head coaches ===
In their history, the Atlanta Falcons have had 20 head coaches. Five coaches have served in interim roles The current head coach of the Falcons is Kevin Stefanski.

Coach	Years	Record	Notes
Norb Hecker	1966–1968	4–26–1 (.145)	Fired after three games in 1968.
Norm Van Brocklin	1968–1974	39–48–3 (.450)	Fired after eight games in 1974.
Marion Campbell	1974–1976	6–19 (.240)	Fired after five games in 1976.
Pat Peppler	1976	3–6 (.333)	Interim head coach.
Leeman Bennett	1977–1982	46–41 (.529)	
Dan Henning	1983–1986	22–41–1 (.352)	
Marion Campbell	1987–1989	11–36 (.234)	Retired after 12 games in 1989.
Jim Hanifan	1989	0–4 (.000)	Interim head coach.
Jerry Glanville	1990–1993	27–37 (.422)	
June Jones	1994–1996	19–29 (.396)	
Dan Reeves	1997–2003	49–59–1 (.454)	
Wade Phillips	2003	2–1 (.667)	Interim head coach.
Jim Mora	2004–2006	26–22 (.542)	
Bobby Petrino	2007	3–10 (.231)	Resigned after 13 games to take over the head coaching job at Arkansas.
Emmitt Thomas	2007	1–2 (.333)	Interim head coach.
Mike Smith	2008–2014	66–46 (.589)	
Dan Quinn	2015–2020	43–42 (.506)	Fired after 5 games in 2020.
Raheem Morris	2020	4–7 (.364)	Interim head coach.
Arthur Smith	2021–2023	21–30 (.412)	
Raheem Morris	2024–2025	16–18 (.471)	
Kevin Stefanski	2026–present	0–0 (–)	

=== Current staff ===
Atlanta Falcons staff
Front office: Owner/chairman – Arthur Blank; President/CEO – Greg Beadles; President of football – Matt Ryan; General manager – Ian Cunningham; Assistant general manager – Jeff Scott; Director of scouting – Adetokunbo Abanikanda; Director of college scouting – Shawn Heinlein; Assistant director of college scouting – Michael Ross; Senior vice president of football administration/senior personnel executive – Bryce Johnston; Senior personnel executive – Ruston Webster; Head coaches: Head coach – Kevin Stefanski; Offensive coaches: Offensive coordinator – Tommy Rees; Passing game coordinator – Tanner Engstrand; Quarterbacks – Alex Van Pelt; Assistant quarterbacks – Jordan Reid; Runningbacks – Michael Pitre; Wide receivers – Robert Prince; Tight ends – Kevin Koger; Offensive line/run game coordinator – Bill Callahan; Assistant offensive line – Nick Jones; Assistant offensive line – Matt Jones; Coaching fellow/offensive assistant – Michael Bearden	Defensive coaches: Defensive coordinator – Jeff Ulbrich; Defensive passing game coordinator – Patrick Toney; Defensive line – Nate Ollie; Outside linebackers – John Timu; Inside linebackers – Barrett Ruud; Secondary – Justin Hood; Assistant defensive backs/nickels – Ricky Manning; Senior defensive assistant – Dave Huxtable; Defensive quality control – Troy Kruchten; Special teams coaches: Special teams coordinator – Craig Aukerman; Assistant special teams – Chase Blackburn; Support staff/coaching operations: Senior advisor to the head coach – Bob Quinn; Director of coaching operations – Brian Griffin; Manager of coaching operations – Jacqueline Roberts; Coordinator of coaching operations – Madison McDoulett; Strength and conditioning: Director of player performance – John Griffin; Assistant director of strength & conditioning – Paul Constantine; Assistant director of strength & conditioning – Erik Jernstrom; Assistant director of strength & conditioning – Josh Nelson; → Coaching Staff → Front Office → More NFL staffs

== Radio and television ==
The Falcons' flagship radio station is WZGC 92-9 The Game. Wes Durham, son of longtime North Carolina Tar Heels voice Woody Durham, is the Falcons' play-by-play announcer, with former Atlanta Falcons quarterback and pro football veteran, Dave Archer serving as color commentator.

In 2014, The CW affiliate WUPA became the official television station of the Falcons, gaining rights to its preseason games, which are produced by CBS Sports.

In the regular season, the team's games are seen on Fox's O&O affiliate WAGA. When the Falcons challenge an AFC team, CBS O&O affiliate WUPA will air those games while Sunday night games are televised on WXIA, the local NBC affiliate.

=== Radio affiliates ===
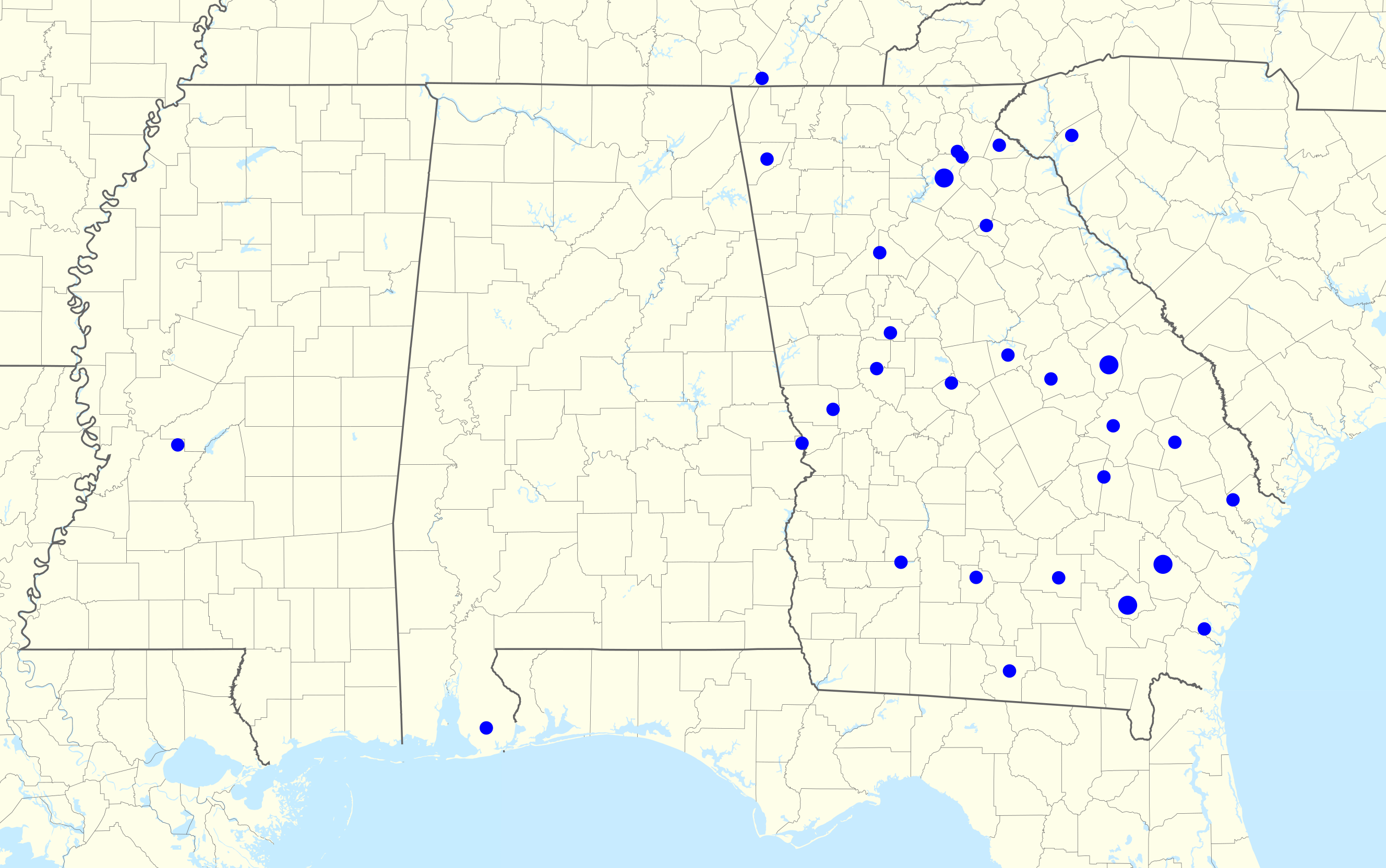
Map of radio affiliates.

==== Georgia ====
City	Call sign	Frequency
Albany	WSRA-AM	1250 AM
Athens	WRFC-AM	960 AM
Atlanta	WZGC-FM (Flagship)	92.9 FM
Brunswick	WSFN-AM	790 AM
Clarkesville	WDUN-FM	102.9 FM
Columbus	WDAK-AM	540 AM
Columbus	WBOJ	1270 AM
Dalton	WBLJ-AM	1230 AM
Douglas	WDMG-AM	860 AM
Gainesville	WDUN	550 AM
Griffin	WKEU-AM	1450 AM
Griffin	WKEU-FM	88.9 FM
Hogansville	WGST-AM	720 AM
Jesup	WLOP-AM	1370 AM
Jesup	WIFO-FM	105.5 FM
LaGrange	WMGP-FM	98.1 FM
Louisville	WPEH-AM	1420 AM
Louisville	WPEH-FM	92.1 FM
Macon	WXKO-AM	1150 AM
Milledgeville	WMVG-AM	1450 AM
Newnan	WRZX	1400 AM
Sandersville	WJFL-FM	101.9 FM
Savannah	WSEG-AM	1400 AM
Savannah	WSEG-FM	104.3 FM
Statesboro	WPTB-AM	850 AM
Swainsboro	WJAT-AM	800 AM
Thomaston	WTGA-FM	101.1 FM
Toccoa	WNEG-AM	630 AM
Valdosta	WVGA	105.9 FM
Vidalia	WVOP-AM	970 AM
Waycross	WFNS-AM	1350 AM

==== Alabama ====
City	Call sign	Frequency
Foley	WHEP-AM	1310 AM

==== Mississippi ====
City	Call sign	Frequency
Jackson	WYAB-FM	103.9 FM

==== South Carolina ====
City	Call sign	Frequency
Clemson	WCCP-FM	104.9 FM

==== Tennessee ====
City	Call sign	Frequency
Chattanooga	WALV-FM	95.3 FM
