= WJJM =

WJJM may refer to:

- WJJM (AM), a radio station (1490 AM) licensed to Lewisburg, Tennessee, United States
- WJJM-FM, a radio station (94.3 FM) licensed to Lewisburg, Tennessee, United States
