= WFNS =

WFNS may stand for:

- WFNS (AM), a radio station (1350 AM) licensed to Blackshear, Georgia, United States
  - WNEZ, a radio station (1230 AM) licensed to Manchester, Connecticut, United States, which held the call sign WFNS in 1989
- World Federation of Neurosurgical Societies, a scientific, non-governmental organization of neurosurgeons
  - The WFNS classification, a scale gauging severity of symptoms in subarachnoid hemorrhage
- Writers' Federation of Nova Scotia, a non-profit organization in Nova Scotia, Canada
