= WSNW =

WSNW may refer to:

- WSNW (AM), a radio station (1150 AM) licensed to serve Seneca, South Carolina, United States
- WJNA (FM), a radio station (96.7 FM) licensed to serve Tignall, Georgia, United States, which held the call sign WSNW-FM from 2015 to 2016
