= WWWR =

WWWR may refer to:

- WWWR-LP, a low-power radio station (97.1 FM) licensed to serve Wadsworth, Ohio, United States
- WFJX, a radio station (910 AM) licensed to serve Roanoke, Virginia, United States
