= WCAB =

- Rutherfordton, North Carolina; United States
- Frequency: 590 kHz
- Branding: Pure Country 100.9/590

Programming
- Format: Classic country
- Affiliations: SRN News Radio; Premiere Networks; Salem Radio Network; Atlanta Braves Radio Network

Ownership
- Owner: Todd Fowler; (Skyline Media of Rutherfordton, LLC)

History
- First air date: October 19, 1966
- Call sign meaning: Country At Its Best

Technical information
- Licensing authority: FCC
- Facility ID: 29261
- Class: D
- Power: 1,000 watts (day); 228 watts (night)
- Transmitter coordinates: 35°23′35″N 81°55′23″W
- Translator: 100.9 W265DW (Rutherfordton)

Links
- Public license information: Public file; LMS
- Website: purecountry101.com

WCAB (590 AM) is a radio station broadcasting a today's country format, licensed to Rutherfordton, North Carolina, United States. The station is currently owned by William Blevins and Signal Hill Media Partners, LLC. WCAB operates at 1,000 watts day and 228 watts night, both non-directional.

The station is an affiliate of the Atlanta Braves radio network, the largest radio affiliate network in Major League Baseball. During the 1970s and ’80s, it played top-40 hits. Ron Wood, Bob St. Thomas, Jiving Jock Tadlock, and The Flying Dutchman were some of the famous and leading DJs during that era.

On January 1, 2024, WCAB changed its format from oldies to Today's country, branded as "Pure Country 100.9/590".
