= WGOG =

- Walhalla, South Carolina; United States
- Broadcast area: Oconee, Pickens and Anderson Counties, South Carolina
- Frequency: 101.7 MHz (HD Radio)
- Branding: 101.7 WGOG

Programming
- Format: Country
- Affiliations: Westwood One; ABC News Radio; United Stations Radio Network

Ownership
- Owner: Appalachian Broadcasting Co., Inc.

History
- First air date: April 19, 1991
- Former call signs: WGOG-FM (1991–2002)
- Former frequencies: 96.3 MHz (1992–2015)
- Call sign meaning: Garden Of the Gods (town nickname)

Technical information
- Licensing authority: FCC
- Facility ID: 2462
- Class: A
- ERP: 6,000 watts
- HAAT: 92 meters (302 ft)
- Transmitter coordinates: 34°51′33.00″N 83°3′31.00″W

Links
- Public license information: Public file; LMS
- Website: wgog.com

WGOG (101.7 FM) is a commercial American radio station licensed by the Federal Communications Commission (FCC) to serve the tri-county area of Oconee, Pickens, and Anderson, South Carolina. The official city of license, and studio location, is Walhalla, South Carolina. WGOG is owned by Appalachian Broadcasting Co., Inc.

WGOG broadcasts a country music format and carries syndicated programing from Westwood One and ABC Radio News/United Stations Radio Network, and broadcasts local Walhalla Razorbacks football with sports news on The Golden Corner Morning Show.

== History ==
WGOG's first broadcast originated April 15, 1959, from the same studios it continued to occupy, on Westminster Highway in Walhalla. WGOG originally broadcast on 1460 kHz. As a corporation, founded by Dorothy Friend and Edith Mooneyham, WGOG was the sole property of Oconee Broadcasting Incorporated. Friend and Mooneyham operated Oconee Broadcasting (WGOG) for nearly 25 years, with various formats, and "mixture" formats, dependent upon the current entertainment trend. WGOG was always dedicated to broadcasting local, regional, and national news. In the 1960s, WGOG changed its frequency to 1000 kHz, assuming a "clear channel" status (clear channel is a radio term meaning the channel is clear of interference). During the 1970s, WGOG was known as "Clear Channel 10 Country, WGOG."

In 1984, Friend and Mooneyham sold WGOG to Luzanne Griffith, who had worked at WGOG years before as Traffic Manager and Receptionist. With the sale, Oconee Broadcasting Incorporated was re-incorporated into Appalachian Broadcasting Incorporated. Under the direction of Griffith, WGOG moved to FM transmission on 96.3 MHz in 1991. For a time, WGOG-FM operated along with WGOG AM (on 1000 kHz), which was eventually dropped.

In 2001, Griffith retired and sold WGOG to Georgia-Carolina Radiocasting, Inc of Toccoa, Georgia. The sale included a promise by the new owners that WGOG would continue to be a locally oriented operation.

On August 19, 2009, WGOG filed to move its license to Powdersville, where it would operate on 105.5 FM. Georgia-Carolina Radiocasting Company would have used this facility to start a new radio station, WESL, to serve the Easley and Powdersville areas. WGOG's programming and call letters would have moved to the company's construction permit for 95.9 FM in Pendleton; co-owner Terry Carter told The Anderson Independent-Mail that the 95.9 transmitter location in Seneca would allow WGOG to serve an area more densely populated than that served by the station's existing transmitter near Tamassee. To comply with Federal Communications Commission (FCC) regulations that required Walhalla to remain the city of license for a radio station, Georgia-Carolina proposed to move WSNW from Seneca to Walhalla; this led Cox Radio to object to the moves, as it was planning to change the city of license of WHZT from Seneca to Williamston, which would have left Seneca with no radio stations. Georgia-Carolina Radiocasting dropped its plans to move WGOG and WSNW on July 18, 2012; the application was dismissed on August 6. In 2014, Georgia-Carolina sold the 95.9 facility to Salem Communications; it signed on as WLTE in 2015.

WGOG's news coverage is headed by Dick Mangrum, a native of Philadelphia, Pennsylvania, who joined WGOG in 1984. Brandon Kessler is the station's General Manager and John Durham hosts the "Golden Corner's Morning Show" heard each weekday morning from 6 am to 9 am. Gary Butts serves as Operations Assistant.

In September 2010, former owner of WGOG Luzanne Griffith died.

On August 5, 2015 WGOG moved from 96.3 to 101.7 MHz.

In late winter of 2018, morning show host Kris Butts announced his decision to leave the show, and radio, to enjoy other journeys. Following his departure, Gary Butts hosted mornings for a short period of time while the company completed the hire of a former WGOG employee, Kyle Brown. Kyle Brown left in 2019 and once again Gary Butts hosted the morning show until the hiring of former GeorgiaCarolina radiocasting employee John Durham on August 15, 2021. John Durham with over 35 plus years in radio had previously worked at sister stations WNEG in Toccoa, Georgia and WRBN in Clayton, Georgia.
