= WLIL =

Radio station in Lenoir City, Tennessee

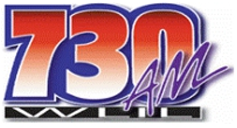

Lenoir City, Tennessee; United States
- Broadcast area: Knoxville, Tennessee
- Frequency: 730 kHz
- Branding: The Legendary AM 730 and 102.7

Programming
- Format: Country

Ownership
- Owner: Fowlers Holdings LLLP
- Sister stations: WIFA

History
- First air date: May 27, 1950

Technical information
- Licensing authority: FCC
- Facility ID: 73211
- Class: D
- ERP: 1,000 watts day; 214 watts night
- Transmitter coordinates: 35°46′12.3″N 84°16′46.7″W
- Translator: 102.7 W274BZ (Lenoir City)

Links
- Public license information: Public file; LMS
- Website: wlilcountry.com

WLIL (730 AM; "The Legendary AM 730") is a radio station broadcasting "East Tennessee's Country Classics." Licensed to Lenoir City, Tennessee, it serves the Knoxville area.

== History ==
WLIL has been "serving east Tennessee since 1950". Arthur Wilkerson, who worked in construction, traveled a lot. One day, he was working in Louisville, Kentucky and could see inside a radio station from where he was working. Finding that interesting, he went to the station after work and sat in the audience of live broadcasts. Wilkerson pondered whether his home town of Lenoir City, Tennessee could support a radio station. In 1949, he applied for a license, and WLIL went on the air at 730, a clear channel, on May 27, 1950, with 1,000 watts during the day.

Although few people had FM radios, Wilkerson also applied for an FM station at 100.3. In 1956, WSM in Nashville closed its FM station, and Wilkerson did the same, believing that if such a big station could not succeed, he had no chance.

Knoxville got its first FM station in 1966, and Wilkerson realized he may have made a mistake. WLIL-FM signed on at 93.5 in 1967.

In addition to his radio station, Wilkerson owned a lumber mill and built custom homes. He served as president of the Tennessee Association of Broadcasters. He was also a pilot and he ran a restaurant.

After Wilkerson died in 1998, BP Broadcasters purchased the station.

In 2006, Progressive Media, owner of WIFA, purchased WLIL from BP Broadcasters LLC. BP kept the FM station, which had simulcast the AM through its entire history. Dwight Wilkerson, son of Arthur, kept WLIK in Newport, Tennessee.

Fowlers Holdings LLLP now owns WLIL. Don Fowler owns furniture stores in Tennessee and Georgia.
