= WKUN =

- Monroe, Georgia; United States
- Frequency: 1490 kHz

Programming
- Format: Oldies
- Affiliations: Westwood One; Atlanta Braves Radio Network

Ownership
- Owner: B.R. Anderson

Technical information
- Licensing authority: FCC
- Facility ID: 12816
- Class: C
- Power: 1,000 watts
- Transmitter coordinates: 33°48′37.00″N 83°42′1.00″W
- Translator: 102.5 W273DL (Monroe)

Links
- Public license information: Public file; LMS
- Webcast: Listen Live
- Website: wkunradio.com

WKUN (1490 AM) is a radio station broadcasting a oldies format. It is licensed to Monroe, Georgia, United States. The station is currently owned by B.R. Anderson and features programming from Westwood One’s Good Time Oldies.
