= WTRP =

- La Grange, Georgia; United States
- Frequency: 620 kHz
- Branding: Classic Country 98.9

Programming
- Format: Classic country
- Affiliations: Westwood One

Ownership
- Owner: Tiger Communications, Inc.
- Sister stations: WRLA

History
- First air date: 1953
- Last air date: 2026

Technical information
- Licensing authority: FCC
- Facility ID: 66959
- Class: D
- Power: 2,500 watts day; 127 watts night
- Transmitter coordinates: 33°3′33″N 85°1′40″W
- Translator: 98.9 W255DP (La Grange)

Links
- Public license information: Public file; LMS

WTRP (620 AM) was a radio station broadcasting a classic country format and was licensed to LaGrange, Georgia, United States. AM 620 WTRP was dedicated to the people of Troup County with local and statewide news, weather, and sports. WTRP was the flagship station for LaGrange College Panthers football, baseball, and basketball teams, Bill Bailey served as the voice of the Panthers. WTRP was also home to Troup County High School sports on the radio with high school football coverage of the Lafayette Christian School Cougars. WTRP was home to baseball and basketball coverage of Troup, LaGrange, Callaway, LaGrange Academy and Lafayette Christian School. The station was owned by Tiger Communications, Inc. and featured programming from Westwood One.

On April 20, 2022, WTRP changed its format from classic hits as "Troup 98.9" to classic country as "Classic Country 98.9" with a playlist centered from the 1980s to the early 2000s.

The Federal Communications Commission cancelled the station's license on August 6, 2026.
