= WBHF =

Radio station in Cartersville, Georgia, United States

- Cartersville, Georgia; United States
- Broadcast area: Atlanta northwest
- Frequency: 1450 kHz
- Branding: 100.3 FM

Programming
- Format: Full service (Adult standards, News/Talk & Sports)
- Affiliations: Classic Hits; Fox News Radio; Georgia News Network; Atlanta Braves Radio Network

Ownership
- Owner: Anverse, Inc.

History
- First air date: July 17, 1946

Technical information
- Licensing authority: FCC
- Facility ID: 22669
- Class: C
- Power: 1,000 watts
- Transmitter coordinates: 34°11′9.00″N 84°48′13.00″W
- Translator: 100.3 W262CD (Cartersville)

Links
- Public license information: Public file; LMS
- Webcast: Listen Live
- Website: wbhfradio.org

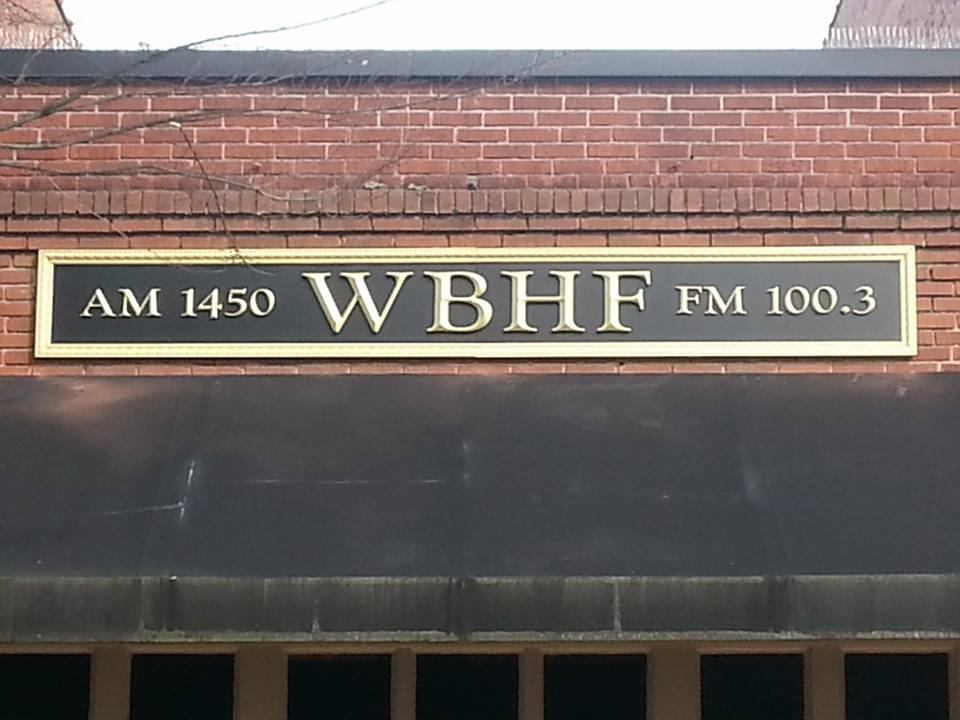
WBHF sign

WBHF AM 1450 (also on FM translator W262CD 100.3 FM) is a radio station founded in 1946 and broadcasting a nostalgic music and talk radio format. Licensed to Cartersville, Georgia, United States, it serves the far northwest Atlanta area. The station is currently owned by the non-profit Anverse, Inc. and features music from the 1970s-1990s from Classic Hits, news from Fox News Radio and the Georgia News Network. It is an affiliate of the Atlanta Braves Radio Network. The station also broadcasts local news, weather and traffic along with many local government meetings, election debates, live talk shows, holiday specials and local sports games.
