= WZLA-FM =

- Abbeville, South Carolina; United States
- Broadcast area: Lakelands
- Frequency: 92.9 MHz
- Branding: Classic Country WZLA

Programming
- Format: Classic country
- Affiliations: Townhall News; Atlanta Braves Radio Network

Ownership
- Owner: Greeson Media Group, LLC

History
- First air date: New Year's Day 1990

Technical information
- Licensing authority: FCC
- Facility ID: 60101
- Class: A
- ERP: 6,000 watts
- HAAT: 74 meters
- Transmitter coordinates: 34°11′13″N 82°19′28″W

Links
- Public license information: Public file; LMS
- Webcast: Listen Live
- Website: wzlaradio.com

WZLA-FM (92.9 MHz) is a radio station broadcasting a classic country format serving the Lakelands area of South Carolina. Licensed to Abbeville, South Carolina, the station is currently owned by Greeson Media Group.
