= WJUL =

- Hiawassee, Georgia; United States
- Frequency: 1230 kHz

Programming
- Format: Classic Hits

Ownership
- Owner: WJUL Radio LLC.
- Sister stations: WCHM

History
- Former call signs: WNGM (2006–2011)

Technical information
- Licensing authority: FCC
- Facility ID: 160899
- Class: C
- Power: 1,000 watts day 1,000 watts night
- Transmitter coordinates: 34°56′34.00″N 83°46′27.00″W
- Translator: 97.7 W249DE (Hiawassee)

Links
- Public license information: Public file; LMS
- Webcast: Listen Live
- Website: wjulradio.com

WJUL (1230 AM) is a radio station broadcasting a Classic Hits format. Licensed to Hiawassee, Georgia, United States, the station is currently owned by WJUL Radio, LLC.

WJUL is the former callsign of what is now WUML, the student run radio outlet of the University of Massachusetts Lowell.
