= WGSX =

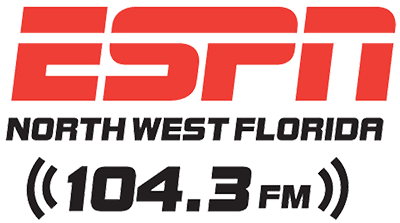
- Lynn Haven, Florida; United States
- Broadcast area: Panama City, Florida
- Frequency: 104.3 MHz
- Branding: 104.3 ESPN Northwest Florida

Programming
- Format: Sports
- Affiliations: ESPN Radio, Fox Sports Radio, Atlanta Braves Radio Network

Ownership
- Owner: Gold Standard Broadcasting, Inc.

History
- First air date: November 9, 2011
- Former call signs: WWHV (2007–2011, CP); WFBA (7/2011-8/2011, CP); WBYW (2011–2017)

Technical information
- Licensing authority: FCC
- Facility ID: 166008
- Class: A
- ERP: 6,000 watts
- HAAT: 122 meters
- Transmitter coordinates: 30°10′47.00″N 85°38′11.00″W

Links
- Public license information: Public file; LMS
- Webcast: Listen Live
- Website: espnpc.com

WGSX (104.3 FM) is a radio station licensed to Lynn Haven, Florida, United States. The station serves the Northwest Florida area. The station is owned by Gold Standard Broadcasting, Inc.Gold Standard Broadcasting, Inc also owns WVLQ Port St Joe.

== History ==
The station went on as "The Bay" in 2011 and went dark on November 16, 2012. It was operational in 2013 as "Power 104.3", a black gospel station. The station changed its call sign to WGSX on June 8, 2017.

On June 26, 2017, WGSX returned to the air with ESPN sports, branded as "104.3 ESPN Panama City, then later increased their coverage area and became 104.3 ESPN Northwest Florida.
