= WJJM-FM =

- Lewisburg, Tennessee; United States
- Frequency: 94.3 MHz
- Branding: POWER 94

Programming
- Format: Country
- Affiliations: Fox News Radio; Tennessee Volunteers football Tennessee Volunteers men's basketball Tennessee Titans Radio Network

Ownership
- Owner: WJJM, Inc.
- Sister stations: WJJM

Technical information
- Licensing authority: FCC
- Facility ID: 40477
- Class: A
- ERP: 6,000 watts
- HAAT: 35.0 meters (114.8 ft)
- Transmitter coordinates: 35°27′3.00″N 86°46′57.00″W

Links
- Public license information: Public file; LMS
- Webcast: Listen live
- Website: wjjm.com

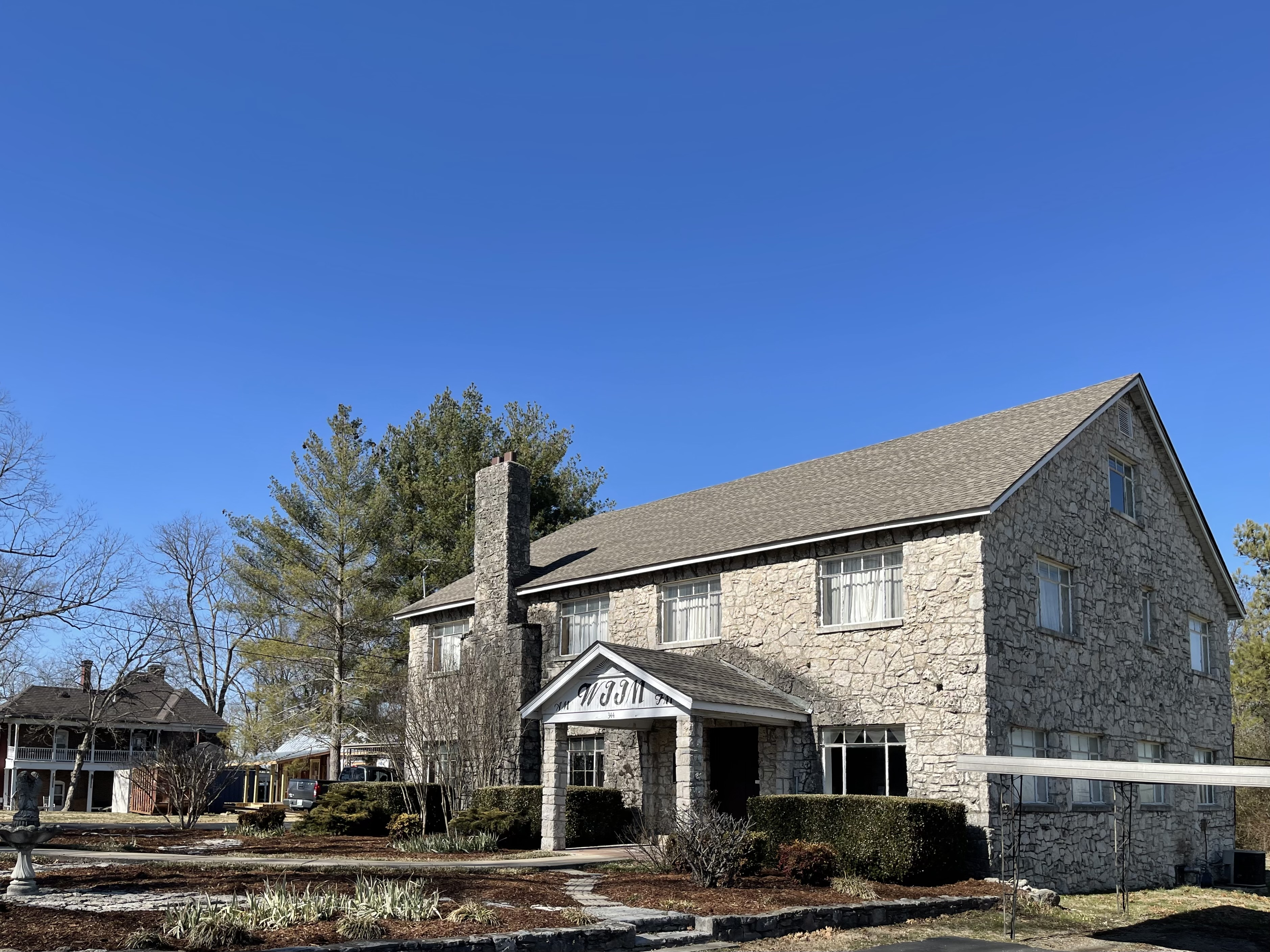
WJJM-FM Building

WJJM-FM (94.3 MHz) is a radio station broadcasting a country music format. Licensed to Lewisburg, Tennessee, United States, the station is currently owned by WJJM, Inc.

== Programming ==
The station features programming from Fox News Radio and numerous syndicators. Local programming includes various full-service features such as local news updates, tradio services (unusually two-tiered, with one program, "Trading Post," offering free ads and another, "Bargain Finders," offering low-cost paid listings), local church services and extensive high school sports coverage.
