= WPAX =

Radio station in Thomasville, Georgia

- Thomasville, Georgia; United States
- Broadcast area: Tallahassee, Florida
- Frequency: 1240 kHz (C-QUAM AM stereo)

Programming
- Format: Adult standards
- Affiliations: CBS News Radio; Westwood One

Ownership
- Owner: Lenrob Enterprises, Inc.

History
- First air date: 1930
- Former call signs: WQDX (1930–1934)

Technical information
- Licensing authority: FCC
- Facility ID: 37034
- Class: C
- Power: 1,000 watts
- Transmitter coordinates: 30.83704°N 83.97883°W
- Translator: 103.7 W279BD (Thomasville)

Links
- Public license information: Public file; LMS
- Website: WPAX on Facebook

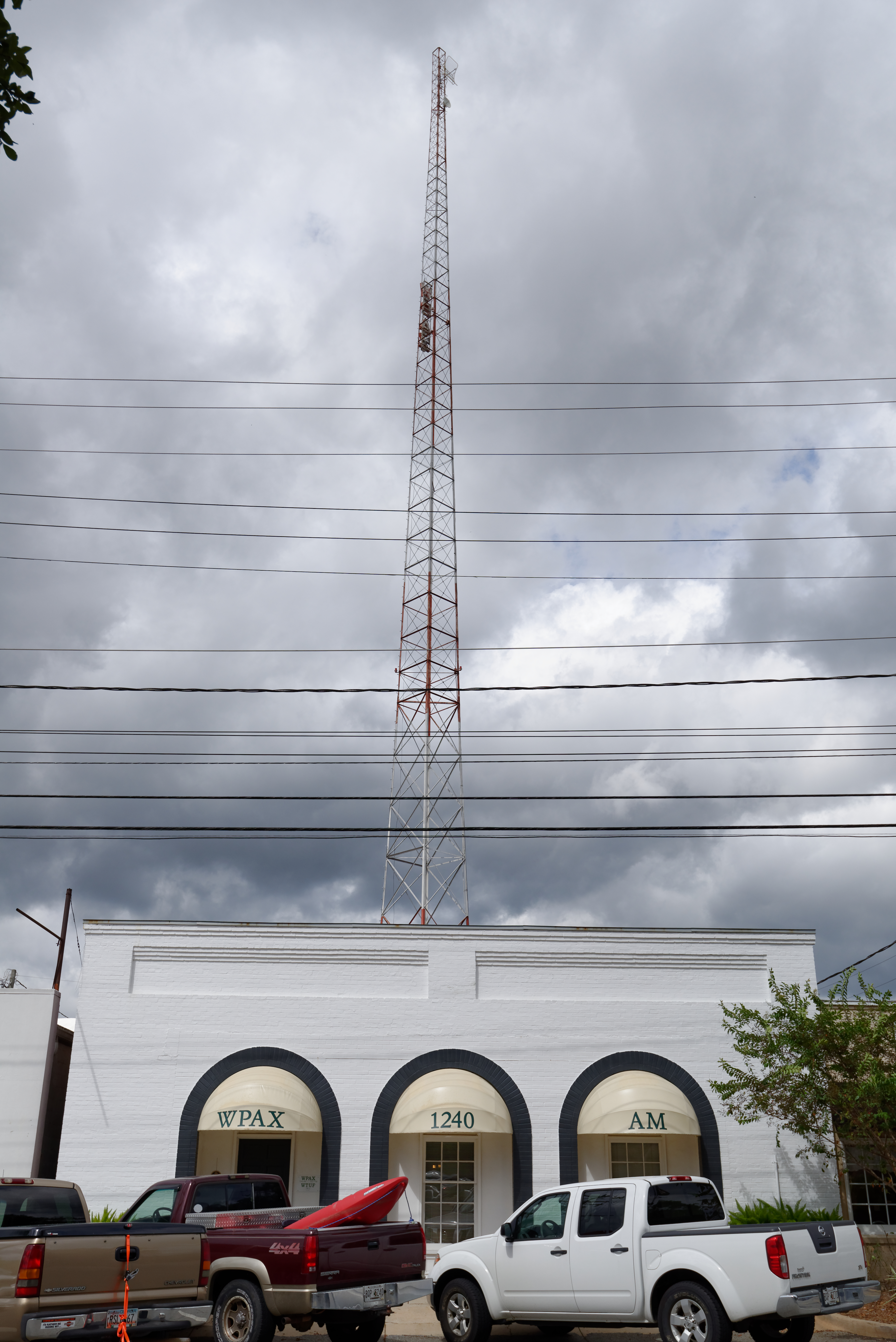
WPAX's studio and 210-foot (74 m) transmitter tower at 117 Remington Avenue date to 1935.

WPAX (1240 AM) is a radio station broadcasting an adult standards format. Licensed to Thomasville, Georgia, United States, the station serves the Tallahassee, Florida area. The station is currently owned by Flint Media, who purchased the station from Lenrob Enterprises in 2023. It features programming from CBS News Radio, Westwood One and Atlanta Braves baseball. WPAX broadcasts full-time with 1,000 watts, and also transmits in C-QUAM AM stereo.

== History ==
According to Federal Communications Commission (FCC) records, WPAX was first licensed, as WQDX, in June 1930. However, station histories commonly trace its origin to an earlier short-lived Thomasville radio station, licensed from late 1922 to early 1923, which also held the callsign WPAX.

This first WPAX was initially licensed on December 27, 1922 to the S-W Radio Company, a small local concern run by Robert Shumate and Hoyt Wimpy, which had previously established a "radio school". (Although "pax" is the Latin word for "peace", its inclusion in the station's call letters was just a coincidence, as this call sign was randomly assigned from an alphabetic block of available callsigns.)

WPAX began regular service in late January 1923 as the first broadcasting station located "south of Macon, in Georgia and North Florida", from a studio located in the Wimpy Garage at the corner of Stevens and Jefferson Streets. The broadcast hours were advertised as daily from 5:30 to 6:00 p.m., Monday, Wednesday and Friday from 8:30 to 9:30 p.m., Saturday from 10:00 to 11:00 a.m., and Sunday from 11:30 a.m. to 12:30 p.m. and 7:30 to 8:30 p.m.

As was common during this era, this first WPAX lasted for only a few months, and was deleted in April 1923.

=== WQDX ===
It would be another seven years before the next licensed broadcasting station was established in Thomasville, when the Federal Radio Commission (FRC) granted an application from Stevens Luke to build a 50–watt station operating on 1210 kHz. The station was issued the sequentially assigned call letters of WQDX. A preliminary test broadcast was made on May 4, 1930, consisting of sermons transmitted from the local First Presbyterian Church. Regular broadcasts started later that month, from a studio inside a barn that was located at the Luke family home at 1141 Gordon Avenue. The new station's initial schedule was daily from 12:30 to 1:30 p.m. and from 8:00 to 10:00 p.m, with Stevens Luke acting as the primary announcer.

Later that year the main studio was moved to 135 East Jackson Street, and in 1931, the station's transmitter power was increased to 100 watts.

=== WPAX ===
Even after the original WPAX ended operations in 1923, Hoyt Wimpy remained in Thomasville and active in the radio industry, and a 1931 biographical review stated that "in Thomasville the word 'Wimpy' means 'radio'". He formed a company, Wimpy-Radio, which sold and serviced receivers and transmitters for radio amateurs and the general public.

In December 1934 ownership of WQDX was transferred to Wimpy, who on December 7 changed the station's call letters to WPAX. Two days later the station made its first broadcast under the new, albeit historic, call letters. The station's facilities were also upgraded with a move to new studios on Remington Avenue, and a transmitter tower was built atop the studio building.

In 1941 WPAX moved to 1240 kHz, as part of the reassignments made under the provisions of the North American Regional Broadcasting Agreement (NARBA).
