= WPCC =

- Clinton, South Carolina; United States
- Broadcast area: Laurens County, South Carolina
- Frequency: 1410 kHz
- Branding: Large Time Network

Programming
- Format: Rhythmic oldies, Beach music

Ownership
- Owner: Thomas Patterson, Jr.; (Large Time Radio Network LLC)

History
- First air date: 1964
- Call sign meaning: Presbyterian College Clinton

Technical information
- Licensing authority: FCC
- Facility ID: 36720
- Class: D
- Power: 1,000 watts day 100 watts night
- Transmitter coordinates: 34°26′42.00″N 81°53′24.00″W
- Translator: 96.5 W243DU (Clinton)

Links
- Public license information: Public file; LMS
- Webcast: Listen Live
- Website: largetime.net

WPCC (1410 AM) is a radio station broadcasting a Rhythmic Oldies/Beach music format licensed to Clinton, South Carolina, and serving Laurens County, South Carolina. The station is currently owned by Thomas Patterson, Jr., through licensee Large Time Radio Network LLC. WPCC signed on an FM translator at 96.5 FM in January 2017.

== Programming ==
Until 2014, WPCC was an ESPN Radio affiliate. The station was an affiliate of the Atlanta Braves radio network.
