= WJJM (AM) =

- Lewisburg, Tennessee; United States
- Frequency: 1490 kHz
- Branding: Fox Sports 1490 Lewisburg

Programming
- Format: Sports
- Affiliations: Fox Sports Radio; Tennessee Lady Volunteers basketball Atlanta Braves Radio Network

Ownership
- Owner: WJJM, Inc.
- Sister stations: WJJM-FM

History
- First air date: May 15, 1947

Technical information
- Licensing authority: FCC
- Facility ID: 40476
- Class: C
- Power: 1,000 watts
- Transmitter coordinates: 35°27′3.00″N 86°46′57.00″W
- Translator: 92.5 W223CY (Lewisburg)

Links
- Public license information: Public file; LMS
- Webcast: Listen live
- Website: wjjm.com

WJJM (1490 kHz, "Fox Sports 1490 Lewisburg") is an AM radio station broadcasting a sports format. Licensed to Lewisburg, Tennessee, United States, the station is currently owned by WJJM, Inc.

== Programming ==
WJJM is affiliated with Fox Sports Radio. WJJM supplements Fox Sports Radio programming with local high school sports, produced in tandem with WJJM-FM; both stations share local news and information programming. WJJM is also affiliated with the Vol Network and the Atlanta Braves Radio Network.
