= WCLA =

- Claxton, Georgia; United States
- Frequency: 1470 kHz
- Branding: WCLA 93.7 FM 1470 AM

Programming
- Format: Adult standards
- Affiliations: CBS News Radio

Ownership
- Owner: W. Danny Swain

History
- First air date: 1958

Technical information
- Licensing authority: FCC
- Facility ID: 65608
- Class: B
- Power: 1,000 watts day 260 watts night
- Transmitter coordinates: 32°10′12.00″N 81°53′56.00″W
- Translator: 93.7 W229AJ (Claxton)

Links
- Public license information: Public file; LMS
- Website: wclaradio.com

WCLA (1470 AM) is a radio station broadcasting an adult standards format. Licensed to Claxton, Georgia, United States, the station is currently owned by W. Danny Swain and features programming from CBS News Radio.
