= WQKR =

- Portland, Tennessee; United States
- Frequency: 1270 kHz
- Branding: Portland's Radio Station

Programming
- Format: Classic hits
- Affiliations: Citadel Media

Ownership
- Owner: Venture Broadcasting LLC

History
- First air date: 1980

Technical information
- Licensing authority: FCC
- Facility ID: 6663
- Class: D
- Power: 1,000 watts day; 43 watts night
- Transmitter coordinates: 36°36′39.7″N 86°34′52.2″W
- Translator: 101.7 W269DQ (Portland)

Links
- Public license information: Public file; LMS

WQKR (1270 AM, "Portland's Radio Station") is a radio station broadcasting a classic hits music format. Licensed to Portland, Tennessee, United States, the station is currently owned by Venture Broadcasting LLC and features programming from Citadel Media and Talk Radio Network. Studios are located on Main Street with its transmitter located on Shady Park Road in Robertson County adjacent to Interstate 65.
