= WSNW (AM) =

- Seneca, South Carolina; United States
- Frequency: 1150 kHz
- Branding: 94.1 The Lake

Programming
- Format: Adult contemporary
- Affiliations: Atlanta Braves Radio Network

Ownership
- Owner: Blue Ridge Broadcasting Corporation

History
- First air date: 1949
- Call sign meaning: Walhalla SeNeca Westminster

Technical information
- Licensing authority: FCC
- Facility ID: 5969
- Class: D
- Power: 1,000 watts day 58 watts night
- Transmitter coordinates: 34°41′11″N 82°59′27″W
- Translators: 88.9 W205CU (Clemson); 94.1 W231BX (Seneca)

Links
- Public license information: Public file; LMS
- Website: wsnwradio.com

WSNW (1150 AM) is a radio station broadcasting adult contemporary and soft rock music format. Licensed to Seneca, South Carolina, United States, the station is currently owned by Blue Ridge Broadcasting Corporation. WSNW will have to move its city of license to Walhalla because WGOG will be moving its city of license to Powdersville, and the FCC is requiring that a radio station continue to be licensed to Walhalla. WSNW will be increasing its power to 5,000 watts during the day so that the station can still use the existing tower on Radio Station Road. WSNW can remain at its Ram Cat Alley studios because the studios must be within 25 miles of the city of license. Programming will also remain the same.

== Programming ==
Programming on WSNW includes mostly adult contemporary music, with local talk & news programming mixed in. The station also covers high school sports games involving the Seneca Bobcats.

WSNW is an affiliate of the Atlanta Braves radio network, the largest radio affiliate network in Major League Baseball.

== History ==
WSNW is the oldest radio station in Oconee County. WSNW was an adult standards radio station whose programming could also be heard on WBFM.

In 2008, WSNW added an FM translator station on 103.3 MHz. In March 2014, WSNW became part of the Georgia-Carolina Radiocasting Company, changed formats to adult contemporary music, and its translator moved from 103.3 FM to 94.1 FM, taking on the brand name, "The Lake." The focus of the station shifted away from local news and talk radio, and no longer hosts any talk radio programming.

Effective February 7, 2020, Georgia-Carolina Radiocasting donated the license for WSNW to Toccoa Foundation, Inc. Effective July 29, 2021, Toccoa Foundation donated WSNW's license to Blue Ridge Broadcasting Corporation.

== Translators ==
Broadcast translators for WSNW
Call sign	Frequency	City of license	FID	ERP (W)	HAAT	Class	Transmitter coordinates	FCC info
W205CU	88.9 FM	Clemson, South Carolina	147255	250	231 m (758 ft)	D	34°49′57.90″N 82°48′13.50″W	LMS
W231BX	94.1 FM	Seneca, South Carolina	155761	250	287.6 m (944 ft)	D	34°41′15″N 82°59′13″W	LMS
