= WSFN =

Coordinates: 31°08′40″N 81°34′56″W

- Brunswick, Georgia; United States
- Broadcast area: Coastal Georgia; Golden Isles of Georgia
- Frequency: 790 kHz
- Branding: ESPN Coastal Georgia

Programming
- Format: Sports
- Affiliations: ESPN Radio

Ownership
- Owner: Southern Media Interactive LLC

History
- First air date: September 1, 1966

Technical information
- Licensing authority: FCC
- Facility ID: 29131
- Class: D
- Power: 500 watts (day); 115 watts (night)
- Translator: 103.7 W279BC (Brunswick)

Links
- Public license information: Public file; LMS
- Webcast: Listen live
- Website: espncoastal.com

WSFN (790 AM) is a commercial radio station licensed to Brunswick, Georgia, United States, and serving Coastal Georgia and the Golden Isles with a sports radio format. Programming is simulcast on WFNS 1350 AM and on FM translator W279BC at 103.7 MHz. Southern Media Interactive LLC owns WSFN and also WSEG in Savannah and WFNS in Blackshear. Most of the programming comes from ESPN Radio. The station also carries Atlanta Braves baseball games.

== History ==
The station first signed on the air on September 1, 1966. It went through multiple formats over the years. In 1998, it switched to all sports radio programming. "The Fan" SportsRadio 790 WSFN was the first and only full-time, 24-hour all-sports radio station serving Brunswick and The Golden Isles of Georgia, brought here by MarMac Communications, LLC., along with WFNS, WSEG, Savannah.

In March 2013, Southern Media Interactive, LLC, acquired WSFN, WFNS and WSEG. The company created the Southern Pigskin Radio Network, broadcasting on all five AM/FM stations in the Brunswick, Savannah and Hilton Head radio markets.

The station is an affiliate of the Atlanta Braves Radio Network, the largest radio network in Major League Baseball. Regular programming on WSFN is pre-empted when the Braves are playing.

On September 4, 2022, it was announced that Shanks Broadcasting would acquire WSFN and would begin carrying the company's "Sports Superstations" network.

In March 2024, WSFN was told by the Federal Communications Commission that it would be fined $16,200 and would lose the license to run its FM translator at 103.7 MHz. The FCC said WSFN had committed numerous violations, including being off the air without notifying the FCC, operating from a location not on its license and using equipment not on its license. WSFN management is considering contesting the fine and translator revocation.
