= WFJX =

- Roanoke, Virginia; United States
- Broadcast area: Roanoke metropolitan area
- Frequency: 910 kHz
- Branding: FOX Radio 910

Programming
- Format: Talk radio
- Affiliations: Fox News Radio

Ownership
- Owner: David S. Points; (Mahon Communications, Inc.)

History
- First air date: April 1, 1957
- Former call signs: WRKE (1957); WHYE (1957–1966); WPXI (1966–1968); WTOY (1968–1990); WBNI (1990–1991); WWWR (1991–2010)
- Call sign meaning: Fox

Technical information
- Licensing authority: FCC
- Facility ID: 52298
- Class: D
- Power: 1,000 watts (day); 84 watts (night)
- Transmitter coordinates: 37°16′6.0″N 79°54′46.0″W
- Translator: 104.3 W282CK (Roanoke)

Links
- Public license information: Public file; LMS
- Webcast: Listen live
- Website: foxradioroanoke.com

WFJX (910 AM) is a commercial radio station licensed to Roanoke, Virginia, United States, serving the Roanoke metropolitan area. It broadcasts a talk radio format branded as "Fox Radio 910" and is owned and operated by David S. Points, through licensee Mahon Communications, Inc.

WFJX is also heard over low-power FM translator W282CK at 104.3 MHz.

== History ==
The station signed on the air on April 1, 1957, as WRKE. It was a daytimer station, required to go off the air at night. The studios were in the American Theater Building.

The station later became WTOY with an R&B and Soul music format, aimed at Roanoke's African-American community. In the 2010, it switched its call sign to WFJX, airing a talk radio format, known as "Fox Radio 910."

== Programming ==
Nationally syndicated conservative talk programs comprise the majority of WFJX's schedule, with Christian talk and teaching shows in morning drive. Fox News Radio newscasts are heard hourly.
