= WRLA =

- West Point, Georgia; United States
- Frequency: 1490 kHz

Programming
- Format: Classic Hits
- Affiliations: Westwood One

Ownership
- Owner: Tiger Communications, Inc.

History
- First air date: 1996
- Former call signs: WDWZ (1996–2002)

Technical information
- Licensing authority: FCC
- Facility ID: 57880
- Class: C
- Power: 1,000 watts unlimited
- Transmitter coordinates: 32°52′26.00″N 85°11′32.00″W
- Translator: (92.3 MHz) W222CT (West Point)

Links
- Public license information: Public file; LMS

WRLA (1490 AM) is a radio station broadcasting a classic hits format. Licensed to West Point, Georgia, United States, the station is currently owned by Tiger Communications, Inc. and features programming from Westwood One.

== History ==
The station went on the air as WDWZ on March 8, 1996. On December 6, 2002, the station changed its call sign to the current WRLA.
