= WLIK =

- Newport, Tennessee; United States
- Frequency: 1270 kHz
- Branding: The Smokier Oldies

Programming
- Format: Oldies

Ownership
- Owner: WLIK Inc.

History
- First air date: April 1954

Technical information
- Licensing authority: FCC
- Facility ID: 73208
- Class: B
- Power: 5,000 watts day; 500 watts night
- Transmitter coordinates: 35°57′49.3″N 83°12′30.6″W
- Translator: 97.9 W250BR (Newport)

Links
- Public license information: Public file; LMS
- Webcast: Listen live
- Website: www.wlik.net

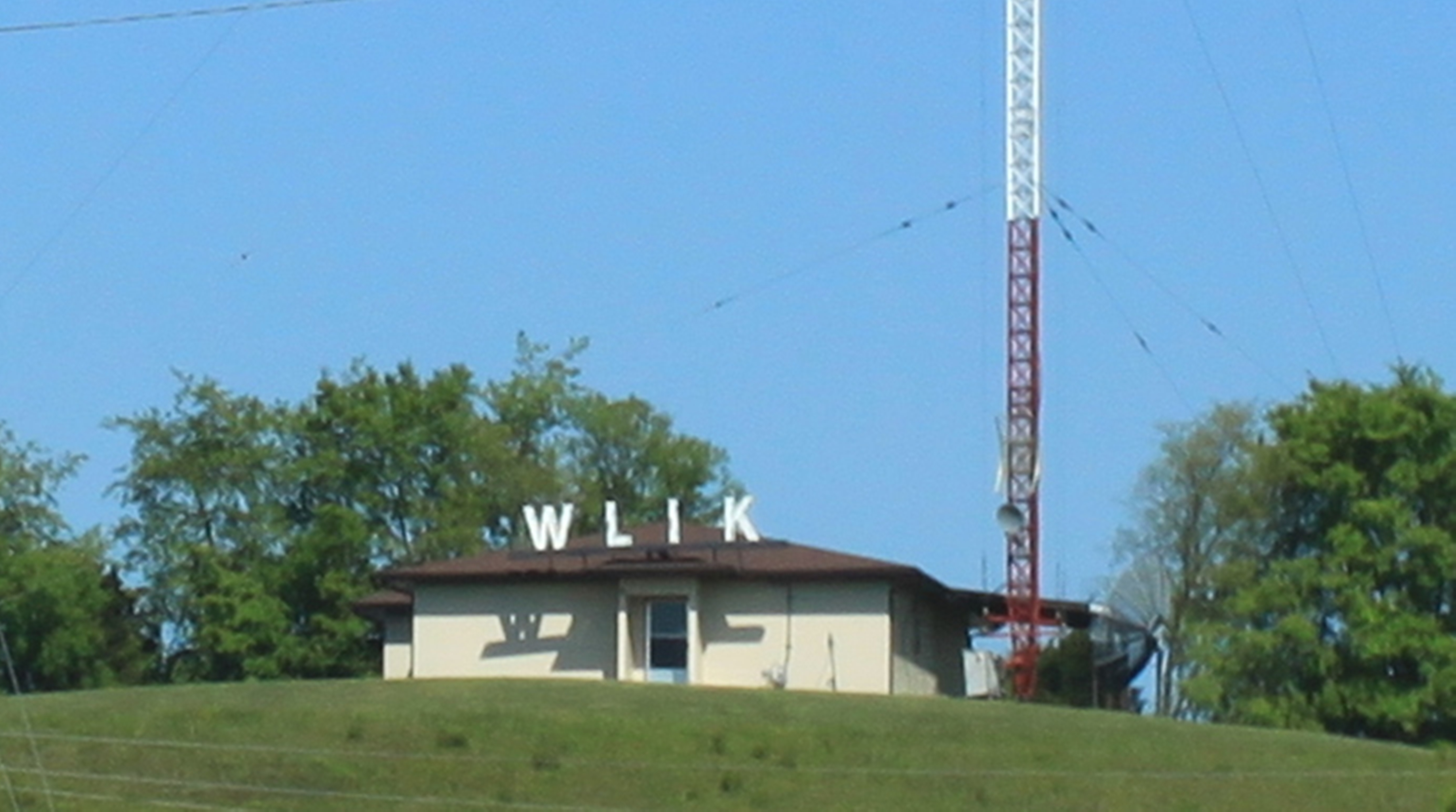
WLIK studios and transmitter

WLIK is a radio station licensed to Newport, Tennessee, with a classic hits/oldies format, broadcasting on 1270 AM and 97.9 FM. Its programming includes high school and University of Tennessee sports as well as community-oriented news and information for Cocke County, Tennessee.

== History ==
WLIK signed on in April 1954 with 1,000 watts, as one of three radio stations owned by Arthur Wilkerson of Lenoir City, Tennessee. Ray Shirley was the first announcer. The station increased its power to 5,000 watts in 1955.

WLIK's office, studios and transmission facilities were seriously damaged by a fire in 1958, reputed to be caused by a roof mounted neon sign. The station quickly resumed operations, with a mostly concrete block structure replacing the former wooden building. In 1968 WLIK moved its transmitter to Rock City and began broadcasting full-time, utilizing a 3-tower directional antenna array to allow the station to operate with 500 watts after sunset. Ira B. Crisp served as station manager from 1954 until 1962, and Dwight Wilkerson, Arthur's son, took over after that and continues as president of the station today. WLIK began duplicating the programming on 1270 AM on FM at 97.9 in 2016.

== On air personalities include/have included ==
Dwight Wilkerson

Angie Wilkerson

Brian Evens

Marty Ricker

Jay Braswell

Rick Brooks

Johnny Naillon

Steve Wilhoit

Gaylen Carpenter

Jason Fox

Matthew Kemper

Curtis Hance
