= WMVG =

- Milledgeville, Georgia; United States
- Broadcast area: Milledgeville, Georgia
- Frequency: 1450 kHz
- Branding: 104.5 WMVG

Programming
- Format: Adult contemporary
- Affiliations: ABC Radio

Ownership
- Owner: Kristopher Kendrick; (Oconee Communications Company, LLC)

History
- First air date: 1946

Technical information
- Licensing authority: FCC
- Facility ID: 73302
- Class: C
- Power: 1,000 watts unlimited
- Transmitter coordinates: 33°4′58.00″N 83°14′59.00″W
- Translator: 104.5 W283CZ (Milledgeville)

Links
- Public license information: Public file; LMS
- Website: wmvgradio.com

WMVG (1450 AM) is a radio station broadcasting an adult contemporary/local information format. Licensed to Milledgeville, Georgia, United States, the station is currently owned by Kristopher Kendrick, through licensee Oconee Communications Company, LLC, and features programming from ABC News Radio, Georgia News Network, Oconee Sports Network, Atlanta Braves Radio Network and Georgia Tech Sports Network.

== Previous logo ==
(WMVG's logo under previous ESPN Radio affiliation)
