= WSEG =

Radio station in Savannah, Georgia

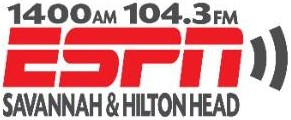
- Savannah, Georgia; United States
- Broadcast area: Savannah area Hilton Head Island, South Carolina
- Frequency: 1400 kHz
- Branding: ESPN Radio FM 104.3

Programming
- Format: Sports
- Affiliations: ESPN Radio, Jacksonville Jaguars

Ownership
- Owner: William J. Dorminy; (Southern Media Interactive LLC)

History
- First air date: 1946 (as WDAR)
- Former call signs: WDAR (1946–1956); WSGA (1956-1999); WHGM (1999–2007)

Technical information
- Licensing authority: FCC
- Facility ID: 25548
- Class: C
- Power: 650 watts
- Transmitter coordinates: 32°4′29.00″N 81°4′17.00″W
- Translators: 104.3 W282AR (Savannah); 92.7 W224DH (Hilton Head Island, South Carolina)

Links
- Public license information: Public file; LMS
- Webcast: Listen Live
- Website: espncoastal.com

WSEG (1400 AM, "ESPN Radio FM 104.3") is a radio station broadcasting a sports format. Licensed to Savannah, Georgia, United States, the station serves the Savannah area. The station is currently owned by William Dorminy, through licensee Southern Media Interactive LLC, and features programming from ESPN Radio. In April 2011, WSEG started simulcasting on FM frequency 104.3 MHz in Savannah (translator W282AR licensed to Savannah).

== History ==
=== WDAR ===
The A.C. Neff Company made an application to the Federal Communications Commission (FCC), to build a new station in Savannah, in the waning days of World War II. Neff was granted a construction permit for a station to operate at 1400 on the AM dial, with 250 watts full-time. The station, assigned the call letters WDAR, took to the air in 1946, and was an ABC affiliate. Their studios were located at 34 E. Bryan Street, a second floor suite of offices, located over the Georgia State Bank building.

By 1948, Neff had built WDAR-FM, at 96.5 MHz with 12,000 watts ERP. The ABC affiliation would later move to AM 1230 WFRP.

=== WSGA ===
In 1956, the station was sold to Coastal Broadcasting for $55,000, and its call sign was changed to WSGA (Savannah, GA). The station's studios were moved to Liberty Street. In 1962, the station's daytime power was increased to 1,000 watts.

Prior to 1967, WSGA aired block programming, with Don McNeill's Breakfast Club mornings, Paul Harvey middays, and top 40 between 3 & 6 p.m. and after 8 at night. From 6 'till 8 was alternately "dinner music", or the live call-in show "Talk Back". It signed off each night at midnight. The station was branded "The Goodtimer".

In October 1967, the station adopted a full-time contemporary hits format. The station began 24 hour a day operations on January 1, 1968. Jerry Rogers was the station's program director and afternoon personality. Other DJs included Danny Kramer, Jim Lloyd, Donny Brook, Fred Holland, Bob Roberts, Chris O'Brien, Mike Allen, Jim Lewis, Chuck Cannon, Denis Reid, and Tim McMillian.

In the early 1980s, WSGA was facing increased competition from FM top-40 stations. In September 1982, the station adopted an adult standards format, as an affiliate of the syndicated Music of Your Life network. In 1988, WSGA was sold to Gulf Atlantic Group, along with 102.1 WZAT, for $4.2 million.

In 1992, the station switched to an all-news format, as an affiliate of CNN Headline News. By January 1996, the station had been taken off the air, due to flood damage. WSGA returned to the air, with its power reduced to 650 watts, simulcasting the modern rock programming of 102.1 WZAT.

In 1998, the station was sold to Sarter Enterprises for $200,000. The station was taken silent as the purchase was being finalized. The station returned to the air in the summer of 1998, and after stunting for about a month, adopted a Christian talk format, simulcasting WNIV.

=== WHGM ===
In 1999, the station was sold to Gilliam Communications for $500,000, and its call sign was changed to WHGM. The station ended its simulcast with WNIV and adopted an urban contemporary gospel format.

=== WSEG ===
WSEG's logo as "Star 1400"

In 2007, Gilliam Communications Inc. sold WHGM to MarMac Communications for $300,000. The station's call sign was changed to WSEG and it adopted an adult standards format. The station was branded "Star 1400" and was an affiliate of America's Best Music. In 2011, the station began to be simulcast on a translator at 104.3 MHz.

In January 2013, WSEG switched to an all-sports format, featuring programming from ESPN Radio, and a local show afternoons. Effective March 19, 2013, MarMac sold WSEG and sister stations WFNS and WSFN to Southern Media Interactive LLC, at a purchase price of $1.3 million.

On September 4, 2022, it was announced that Shanks Broadcasting will acquire WSEG and will begin carrying the company's "Sports Superstations" network.

== Translators ==
WSEG is simulcast on a translator at 104.3 in Savannah, Georgia, and a translator at 92.7 MHz in Hilton Head Island, South Carolina.

Call sign	Frequency	City of license	FID	ERP (W)	HAAT	Class	FCC info
W224DH	92.7 FM	Hilton Head Island, South Carolina	140895	120	78 m (256 ft)	D	LMS
W282AR	104.3 FM	Savannah, Georgia	151474	180	142 m (466 ft)	D	LMS
