= WXKO =

- Fort Valley, Georgia; United States
- Frequency: 1150 kHz
- Branding: The Superstations

Programming
- Format: Sports
- Affiliations: ESPN Radio

Ownership
- Owner: Bill Shanks; (Shanks Broadcasting, LLC)

History
- First air date: 1951 (as WFPM)
- Former call signs: WFPM (1951–1981)

Technical information
- Licensing authority: FCC
- Facility ID: 41988
- Class: D
- Power: 1,000 watts day 62 watts night
- Transmitter coordinates: 32°34′34.00″N 83°54′17.00″W
- Translators: 93.1 W226BZ (Macon); 105.9 W290BD (Montezuma)

Links
- Public license information: Public file; LMS
- Webcast: Listen live
- Website: thesuperstations.com

WXKO (1150 AM) is a radio station broadcasting a sports format. Licensed to Fort Valley, Georgia, United States, the station is owned by Bill Shanks, through licensee Shanks Broadcasting, LLC.

== History ==
On June 1, 2016, WXKO changed their format to sports, with programming from ESPN Radio.
