= WFNS (AM) =

Radio station in Blackshear, Georgia

- Blackshear, Georgia; United States
- Broadcast area: Waycross, Georgia
- Frequency: 1350 kHz

Programming
- Format: Sports

Ownership
- Owner: William J. Dorminy; (Southern Media Interactive LLC)

History
- First air date: 1961
- Former call signs: WIEZ (6/1983-12/1983); WGIA (1983–2000); WXRB (2000–2001)

Technical information
- Licensing authority: FCC
- Facility ID: 11076
- Class: D
- Power: 2,500 watts day 117 watts night
- Transmitter coordinates: 31°18′44.00″N 82°14′0.00″W
- Translator: 98.5 W253CI (Blackshear)

Links
- Public license information: Public file; LMS

WFNS (1350 kHz) is an AM radio station licensed to Blackshear, Georgia, United States. The station is currently owned by William Dorminy, through licensee Southern Media Interactive LLC.

== History ==
The station went on the air as WIEZ on 1983-06-27. On 1983-12-25, the station changed its call sign to WGIA, on 2000-05-04 to WXRB, and on 2001-07-24 to the current WFNS,

On September 4, 2022, it was announced that Shanks Broadcasting will acquire WFNS and will begin carrying the company's "Sports Superstations" network.
