= List of AM radio stations in the United States by call sign (initial letters WN–WS) =

This is a list of AM radio stations in the United States having call signs beginning with the letters WN to WS.

== WN-- ==
Callsign	Frequency	City of license
WNAH	1360 AM	Nashville, Tennessee
WNAM	1280 AM	Neenah–Menasha, Wisconsin
WNAT	1450 AM	Natchez, Mississippi
WNAU	1470 AM	New Albany, Mississippi
WNAV	1430 AM	Annapolis, Maryland
WNAW	1230 AM	North Adams, Massachusetts
WNAX	570 AM	Yankton, South Dakota
WNBF	1290 AM	Binghamton, New York
WNBH	1340 AM	New Bedford, Massachusetts
WNBP	1450 AM	Newburyport, Massachusetts
WNBS	1340 AM	Murray, Kentucky
WNBY	1450 AM	Newberry, Michigan
WNCA	1570 AM	Siler City, North Carolina
WNCL	930 AM	Milford, Delaware
WNCO	1340 AM	Ashland, Ohio
WNCT	1070 AM	Greenville, North Carolina
WNDA	1490 AM	Wellsboro, Pennsylvania
WNDB	1150 AM	Daytona Beach, Florida
WNDC	1190 AM	Leesburg, Virginia
WNDE	1260 AM	Indianapolis, Indiana
WNDI	1550 AM	Sullivan, Indiana
WNDO	1520 AM	Apopka, Florida
WNDZ	750 AM	Portage, Indiana
WNEA	1300 AM	Newnan, Georgia
WNEB	1230 AM	Worcester, Massachusetts
WNEG	630 AM	Toccoa, Georgia
WNEL	1430 AM	Caguas, Puerto Rico
WNER	1410 AM	Watertown, New York
WNES	1050 AM	Central City, Kentucky
WNEZ	1230 AM	Manchester, Connecticut
WNFL	1440 AM	Green Bay, Wisconsin
WNFO	1430 AM	Sun City Hilton Head, South Carolina
WNGL	1410 AM	Mobile, Alabama
WNGO	1320 AM	Mayfield, Kentucky
WNGZ	1490 AM	Watkins Glen, New York
WNIK	1230 AM	Arecibo, Puerto Rico
WNIL	1290 AM	Niles, Michigan
WNIO	1390 AM	Youngstown, Ohio
WNIS	790 AM	Norfolk, Virginia
WNIV	970 AM	Atlanta
WNIX	1330 AM	Greenville, Mississippi
WNJC	1360 AM	Washington Township, New Jersey
WNJE	920 AM	Trenton, New Jersey
WNKW	1480 AM	Neon, Kentucky
WNLA	1390 AM	Indianola, Mississippi
WNLK	1350 AM	Norwalk, Connecticut
WNLR	1150 AM	Churchville, Virginia
WNMA	1210 AM	Miami Springs, Florida
WNMB	900 AM	North Myrtle Beach, South Carolina
WNML	990 AM	Knoxville, Tennessee
WNMT	650 AM	Nashwauk, Minnesota
WNNC	1230 AM	Newton, North Carolina
WNNR	970 AM	Jacksonville, Florida
WNNW	800 AM	Lawrence, Massachusetts
WNNZ	640 AM	Westfield, Massachusetts
WNOO	1260 AM	Chattanooga, Tennessee
WNOP	740 AM	Newport, Kentucky
WNOS	1450 AM	New Bern, North Carolina
WNOV	860 AM	Milwaukee, Wisconsin
WNOW	1030 AM	Mint Hill, North Carolina
WNPC	1060 AM	Newport, Tennessee
WNPV	1440 AM	Lansdale, Pennsylvania
WNPZ	1580 AM	Knoxville, Tennessee
WNQM	1300 AM	Nashville, Tennessee
WNRG	940 AM	Grundy, Virginia
WNRI	1380 AM	Woonsocket, Rhode Island
WNRJ	1200 AM	Huntington, West Virginia
WNRN	1590 AM	Richmond, Virginia
WNRP	1620 AM	Gulf Breeze, Florida
WNRR	1380 AM	North Augusta, South Carolina
WNRS	1420 AM	Herkimer, New York
WNRV	990 AM	Narrows–Pearisburg, Virginia
WNSR	560 AM	Brentwood, Tennessee
WNST	1570 AM	Towson, Maryland
WNSW	1430 AM	Newark, New Jersey
WNTA	1330 AM	Rockford, Illinois
WNTC	790 AM	Ashland City, Tennessee
WNTF	1580 AM	Bithlo, Florida
WNTJ	1490 AM	Johnstown, Pennsylvania
WNTM	710 AM	Mobile, Alabama
WNTN	1550 AM	Cambridge, Massachusetts
WNTP	990 AM	Philadelphia
WNTS	1590 AM	Beech Grove, Indiana
WNTX	1350 AM	Fredericksburg, Virginia
WNTY	990 AM	Southington, Connecticut
WNVA	1350 AM	Norton, Virginia
WNVI	1040 AM	Moca, Puerto Rico
WNVL	1240 AM	Nashville, Tennessee
WNVR	1030 AM	Vernon Hills, Illinois
WNVY	1090 AM	Cantonment, Florida
WNWC	1190 AM	Sun Prairie, Wisconsin
WNWF	1470 AM	Evergreen, Alabama
WNWI	1080 AM	Oak Lawn, Illinois
WNWR	1540 AM	Philadelphia
WNWS	1520 AM	Brownsville, Tennessee
WNWW	1290 AM	West Hartford, Connecticut
WNWZ	1410 AM	Grand Rapids, Michigan
WNXT	1260 AM	Portsmouth, Ohio
WNYC	820 AM	New York City
WNYG	1580 AM	Patchogue, New York
WNYH	740 AM	Huntington, New York
WNYM	970 AM	Hackensack, New Jersey
WNYY	1470 AM	Ithaca, New York
WNZE	1400 AM	Clarksville, Tennessee
WNZF	1550 AM	Bunnell, Florida
WNZK	690 AM	Dearborn Heights, Michigan

== WO ==
Callsign	Frequency	City of license
WOAD	1300 AM	Jackson, Mississippi
WOAI	1200 AM	San Antonio, Texas
WOAM	1350 AM	Peoria, Illinois
WOAP	1080 AM	Owosso, Michigan
WOAY	860 AM	Oak Hill, West Virginia
WOBL	1320 AM	Oberlin, Ohio
WOBM	1310 AM	Asbury Park, New Jersey
WOBT	1240 AM	Rhinelander, Wisconsin
WOBX	1530 AM	Wanchese, North Carolina
WOC	1420 AM	Davenport, Iowa
WOCA	1370 AM	Ocala, Florida
WOCC	1550 AM	Corydon, Indiana
WOCJ	1440 AM	Pontotoc, Mississippi
WOCO	1260 AM	Oconto, Wisconsin
WOCQ	1510 AM	Salem, New Jersey
WODT	1280 AM	New Orleans, Louisiana
WODY	1160 AM	Fieldale, Virginia
WOEG	1220 AM	Hazlehurst, Mississippi
WOEN	1360 AM	Olean, New York
WOFX	980 AM	Troy, New York
WOGO	680 AM	Hallie, Wisconsin
WOGR	1540 AM	Charlotte, North Carolina
WOHI	1490 AM	East Liverpool, Ohio
WOHS	1390 AM	Shelby, North Carolina
WOI	640 AM	Ames, Iowa
WOIR	1430 AM	Homestead, Florida
WOIZ	1130 AM	Guayanilla, Puerto Rico
WOKA	1310 AM	Douglas, Georgia
WOKB	1680 AM	Winter Garden, Florida
WOKC	1570 AM	Okeechobee, Florida
WOKR	1310 AM	Canandaigua, New York
WOKS	1340 AM	Columbus, Georgia
WOKT	1040 AM	Cannonsburg, Kentucky
WOKV	690 AM	Jacksonville, Florida
WOKY	920 AM	Milwaukee, Wisconsin
WOL	1450 AM	Washington, D.C.
WOLA	1380 AM	Barranquitas, Puerto Rico
WOLB	1010 AM	Baltimore, Maryland
WOLF	1490 AM	Syracuse, New York
WOLH	1230 AM	Florence, South Carolina
WOLI	910 AM	Spartanburg, South Carolina
WOLY	1450 AM	Olean, New York
WOMI	1490 AM	Owensboro, Kentucky
WOMN	1110 AM	Franklinton, Louisiana
WOMT	1240 AM	Manitowoc, Wisconsin
WOND	1400 AM	Pleasantville, New Jersey
WONE	980 AM	Dayton, Ohio
WONG	1150 AM	Canton, Mississippi
WONN	1230 AM	Lakeland, Florida
WONQ	1030 AM	Oviedo, Florida
WONW	1280 AM	Defiance, Ohio
WOOD	1300 AM	Grand Rapids, Michigan
WOOF	560 AM	Dothan, Alabama
WOON	1240 AM	Woonsocket, Rhode Island
WOPG	1460 AM	Albany, New York
WOPI	1490 AM	Bristol, Virginia
WOPP	1290 AM	Opp, Alabama
WOQI	1020 AM	Adjuntas, Puerto Rico
WOR	710 AM	New York City
WORA	760 AM	Mayagüez, Puerto Rico
WORC	1310 AM	Worcester, Massachusetts
WORD	950 AM	Spartanburg, South Carolina
WORL	950 AM	Orlando, Florida
WORM	1010 AM	Savannah, Tennessee
WORV	1580 AM	Hattiesburg, Mississippi
WOSH	1490 AM	Oshkosh, Wisconsin
WOSO	1030 AM	San Juan, Puerto Rico
WOSW	1300 AM	Fulton, New York
WOTE	1380 AM	Clintonville, Wisconsin
WOTS	1220 AM	Kissimmee, Florida
WOUB	1340 AM	Athens, Ohio
WOUF	750 AM	Petoskey, Michigan
WOWO	1190 AM	Fort Wayne, Indiana
WOW	590 AM	Omaha, Nebraska
WOWW	1430 AM	Germantown, Tennessee
WOYK	1350 AM	York, Pennsylvania
WOZK	900 AM	Ozark, Alabama
WOZN	1670 AM	Madison, Wisconsin

== WP-- ==
Callsign	Frequency	City of license
WPAA	1190 AM	St. Marys, Georgia
WPAB	550 AM	Ponce, Puerto Rico
WPAD	1560 AM	Paducah, Kentucky
WPAK	1490 AM	Farmville, Virginia
WPAQ	740 AM	Mount Airy, North Carolina
WPAT	930 AM	Paterson, New Jersey
WPAX	1240 AM	Thomasville, Georgia
WPAY	1520 AM	Rossford, Ohio
WPAZ	1370 AM	Pottstown, Pennsylvania
WPBR	1340 AM	Lantana, Florida
WPBS	1040 AM	Conyers, Georgia
WPCA	800 AM	Waupaca, Wisconsin
WPCC	1410 AM	Clinton, South Carolina
WPCE	1400 AM	Portsmouth, Virginia
WPCF	1290 AM	Panama City Beach, Florida
WPCH	1310 AM	West Point, Georgia
WPCI	1490 AM	Greenville, South Carolina
WPCM	920 AM	Burlington–Graham, North Carolina
WPCN	1010 AM	Stevens Point, Wisconsin
WPCO	840 AM	Stroudsburg, Pennsylvania
WPDC	1600 AM	Elizabethtown, Pennsylvania
WPDM	1470 AM	Potsdam, New York
WPDX	1300 AM	Morgantown, West Virginia
WPEH	1420 AM	Louisville, Georgia
WPEK	880 AM	Fairview, North Carolina
WPEL	1250 AM	Montrose, Pennsylvania
WPEO	1020 AM	Peoria, Illinois
WPET	950 AM	Greensboro, North Carolina
WPFB	910 AM	Middletown, Ohio
WPFC	1550 AM	Baton Rouge, Louisiana
WPFD	850 AM	Fairview, Tennessee
WPFJ	1480 AM	Franklin, North Carolina
WPFP	980 AM	Park Falls, Wisconsin
WPFR	1480 AM	Terre Haute, Indiana
WPGG	1450 AM	Atlantic City, New Jersey
WPGM	1570 AM	Danville, Pennsylvania
WPGO	820 AM	Horseheads, New York
WPGP	1250 AM	Pittsburgh, Pennsylvania
WPGR	1510 AM	Monroeville, Pennsylvania
WPGS	840 AM	Mims, Florida
WPGW	1440 AM	Portland, Indiana
WPGY	1580 AM	Ellijay, Georgia
WPHE	690 AM	Phoenixville, Pennsylvania
WPHM	1380 AM	Port Huron, Michigan
WPHT	1210 AM	Philadelphia
WPIC	790 AM	Sharon, Pennsylvania
WPIE	1160 AM	Trumansburg, New York
WPIF	1470 AM	Georgetown, South Carolina
WPIN	810 AM	Dublin, Virginia
WPIP	880 AM	Winston-Salem, North Carolina
WPIT	730 AM	Pittsburgh, Pennsylvania
WPIW	1590 AM	Mt. Vernon, Indiana
WPJF	1260 AM	Greenville, South Carolina
WPJK	1580 AM	Orangeburg, South Carolina
WPJL	1240 AM	Raleigh, North Carolina
WPJM	800 AM	Greer, South Carolina
WPJS	1330 AM	Conway, South Carolina
WPJX	1500 AM	Zion, Illinois
WPKC	1540 AM	Exeter, New Hampshire
WPKE	1240 AM	Pikeville, Kentucky
WPKX	930 AM	Rochester, New Hampshire
WPKY	1580 AM	Princeton, Kentucky
WPKZ	1280 AM	Fitchburg, Massachusetts
WPLI	1390 AM	Lynchburg, Virginia
WPLK	800 AM	Palatka, Florida
WPLM	1390 AM	Plymouth, Massachusetts
WPLO	610 AM	Grayson, Georgia
WPLY	610 AM	Roanoke, Virginia
WPMB	1500 AM	Vandalia, Illinois
WPMH	1270 AM	Newport News, Virginia
WPMO	1580 AM	Pascagoula–Moss Point, Mississippi
WPMZ	1110 AM	East Providence, Rhode Island
WPNH	1300 AM	Plymouth, New Hampshire
WPNN	790 AM	Pensacola, Florida
WPNO	1450 AM	South Paris, Maine
WPNS	1140 AM	Destin, Florida
WPNW	1260 AM	Zeeland, Michigan
WPOG	710 AM	St. Matthews, South Carolina
WPOL	1340 AM	Winston-Salem, North Carolina
WPOM	1600 AM	Riviera Beach, Florida
WPON	1460 AM	Walled Lake, Michigan
WPOP	1410 AM	Hartford, Connecticut
WPOT	1500 AM	Trenton, Tennessee
WPPA	1360 AM	Pottsville, Pennsylvania
WPPC	1570 AM	Penuelas, Puerto Rico
WPRA	990 AM	Mayagüez, Puerto Rico
WPRD	1440 AM	Winter Park, Florida
WPRE	980 AM	Prairie du Chien, Wisconsin
WPRO	630 AM	Providence, Rhode Island
WPRP	910 AM	Ponce, Puerto Rico
WPRR	1680 AM	Ada, Michigan
WPRT	960 AM	Prestonsburg, Kentucky
WPRV	790 AM	Providence, Rhode Island
WPSE	1450 AM	Erie, Pennsylvania
WPSL	1590 AM	Port St. Lucie, Florida
WPSN	1590 AM	Honesdale, Pennsylvania
WPSO	1500 AM	New Port Richey, Florida
WPSP	1190 AM	Royal Palm Beach, Florida
WPTB	850 AM	Statesboro, Georgia
WPTF	680 AM	Raleigh, North Carolina
WPTL	920 AM	Canton, North Carolina
WPTN	780 AM	Cookeville, Tennessee
WPTR	1240 AM	Schenectady, New York
WPTT	1540 AM	Hartford, Wisconsin
WPTW	1570 AM	Piqua, Ohio
WPTX	1690 AM	Lexington Park, Maryland
WPVD	1290 AM	Providence, Rhode Island
WPVL	1590 AM	Platteville, Wisconsin
WPVW	1190 AM	Wabasha, Minnesota
WPWA	1590 AM	Chester, Pennsylvania
WPWC	1480 AM	Dumfries–Triangle, Virginia
WPWT	870 AM	Colonial Heights, Tennessee
WPYB	1130 AM	Benson, North Carolina
WPYR	1380 AM	Baton Rouge, Louisiana
WPZS	610 AM	Charlotte, North Carolina

== WQ-- ==
Callsign	Frequency	City of license
WQAM	560 AM	Miami, Florida
WQBA	1140 AM	Miami, Florida
WQBN	1300 AM	Temple Terrace, Florida
WQBQ	1410 AM	Leesburg, Florida
WQBS	870 AM	San Juan, Puerto Rico
WQCD	1550 AM	Delaware, Ohio
WQCH	1590 AM	LaFayette, Georgia
WQCR	1500 AM	Alabaster, Alabama
WQCT	1520 AM	Bryan, Ohio
WQDR	570 AM	Raleigh, North Carolina
WQEZ	1370 AM	Fort Campbell, Kentucky
WQFX	1130 AM	Gulfport, Mississippi
WQHL	1250 AM	Live Oak, Florida
WQII	1140 AM	San Juan, Puerto Rico
WQJM	1230 AM	Pineville, Kentucky
WQKR	1270 AM	Portland, Tennessee
WQLA	960 AM	La Follette, Tennessee
WQLL	1370 AM	Pikesville, Maryland
WQMS	1500 AM	Quitman, Mississippi
WQMV	1060 AM	Waverly, Tennessee
WQNO	690 AM	New Orleans, Louisiana
WQNT	1450 AM	Charleston, South Carolina
WQOF	1260 AM	Washington, D.C.
WQOM	1060 AM	Natick, Massachusetts
WQOP	1460 AM	Jacksonville, Florida
WQOS	1080 AM	Coral Gables, Florida
WQPM	1300 AM	Princeton, Minnesota
WQRM	850 AM	Duluth, Minnesota
WQRX	870 AM	Valley Head, Alabama
WQSC	1340 AM	Charleston, South Carolina
WQTM	1480 AM	Fair Bluff, North Carolina
WQUL	1510 AM	Woodruff, South Carolina
WQVD	700 AM	Orange–Athol, Massachusetts
WQVN	1360 AM	North Miami, Florida
WQVR	940 AM	Webster, Massachusetts
WQXI	790 AM	Atlanta
WQXL	1470 AM	Columbia, South Carolina
WQXM	1460 AM	Bartow, Florida
WQXO	1400 AM	Munising, Michigan
WQYQ	1400 AM	St. Joseph, Michigan
WQZQ	830 AM	Goodlettsville, Tennessee

== WR-- ==
Callsign	Frequency	City of license
WR2XJR	670 AM	Portsmouth, Virginia
WRAA	1330 AM	Luray, Virginia
WRAB	1380 AM	Arab, Alabama
WRAD	1460 AM	Radford, Virginia
WRAK	1400 AM	Williamsport, Pennsylvania
WRAM	1330 AM	Monmouth, Illinois
WRAR	1000 AM	Tappahannock, Virginia
WRAW	1340 AM	Reading, Pennsylvania
WRAX	1600 AM	Bedford, Pennsylvania
WRAY	1250 AM	Princeton, Indiana
WRBD	1230 AM	Gainesville, Florida
WRBZ	1250 AM	Wetumpka, Alabama
WRCA	1330 AM	Watertown, Massachusetts
WRCE	1450 AM	Richland Center, Wisconsin
WRCG	1420 AM	Columbus, Georgia
WRCI	1520 AM	Three Rivers, Michigan
WRCK	1480 AM	Remsen, New York
WRCR	1700 AM	Haverstraw, New York
WRCS	970 AM	Ahoskie, North Carolina
WRCW	1250 AM	Warrenton, Virginia
WRDB	1400 AM	Reedsburg, Wisconsin
WRDD	1480 AM	Shippensburg, Pennsylvania
WRDN	1430 AM	Durand, Wisconsin
WRDT	560 AM	Monroe, Michigan
WRDZ	1300 AM	La Grange, Illinois
WREC	600 AM	Memphis, Tennessee
WRED	1440 AM	Westbrook, Maine
WREJ	990 AM	Richmond, Virginia
WREL	1450 AM	Lexington, Virginia
WREV	1220 AM	Reidsville, North Carolina
WREY	630 AM	St. Paul, Minnesota
WRFC	960 AM	Athens, Georgia
WRFD	880 AM	Columbus–Worthington, Ohio
WRGA	1470 AM	Rome, Georgia
WRGC	540 AM	Sylva, North Carolina
WRGM	1440 AM	Ontario, Ohio
WRGS	1370 AM	Rogersville, Tennessee
WRHC	1550 AM	Coral Gables, Florida
WRHI	1340 AM	Rock Hill, South Carolina
WRHL	1060 AM	Rochelle, Illinois
WRIE	1260 AM	Erie, Pennsylvania
WRIG	1390 AM	Schofield, Wisconsin
WRIK	750 AM	Brookport, Illinois
WRIN	1560 AM	Rensselaer, Indiana
WRIV	1390 AM	Riverhead, New York
WRIX	1020 AM	Homeland Park, South Carolina
WRJC	1270 AM	Mauston, Wisconsin
WRJD	1410 AM	Durham, North Carolina
WRJM	1290 AM	Greenfield, Wisconsin
WRJN	1400 AM	Racine, Wisconsin
WRJR	670 AM	Claremont, Virginia
WRJW	1320 AM	Picayune, Mississippi
WRJZ	620 AM	Knoxville, Tennessee
WRKB	1460 AM	Kannapolis, North Carolina
WRKK	1200 AM	Hughesville, Pennsylvania
WRKL	910 AM	New City, New York
WRKM	1350 AM	Carthage, Tennessee
WRKO	680 AM	Boston, Massachusetts
WRKQ	1250 AM	Madisonville, Tennessee
WRKY	1490 AM	Lancaster, Pennsylvania
WRLA	1490 AM	West Point, Georgia
WRLD	1240 AM	Reading, Pennsylvania
WRLF	1490 AM	Fairmont, West Virginia
WRLL	1450 AM	Cicero, Illinois
WRLZ	1160 AM	St. Cloud, Florida
WRMG	1430 AM	Red Bay, Alabama
WRMN	1410 AM	Elgin, Illinois
WRMS	790 AM	Beardstown, Illinois
WRMT	1490 AM	Rocky Mount, North Carolina
WRNA	1140 AM	China Grove, North Carolina
WRNE	980 AM	Gulf Breeze, Florida
WRNJ	1510 AM	Hackettstown, New Jersey
WRNL	910 AM	Richmond, Virginia
WRNR	740 AM	Martinsburg, West Virginia
WRNS	960 AM	Kinston, North Carolina
WRNY	1350 AM	Rome, New York
WROA	1390 AM	Gulfport, Mississippi
WROC	950 AM	Rochester, New York
WROD	1340 AM	Daytona Beach, Florida
WROK	1440 AM	Rockford, Illinois
WROL	950 AM	Boston, Massachusetts
WROM	710 AM	Rome, Georgia
WRON	1400 AM	Ronceverte, West Virginia
WROS	1050 AM	Jacksonville, Florida
WROW	590 AM	Albany, New York
WROX	1450 AM	Clarksdale, Mississippi
WROY	1460 AM	Carmi, Illinois
WRPM	1170 AM	Poplarville, Mississippi
WRPN	1600 AM	Ripon, Wisconsin
WRPQ	740 AM	Baraboo, Wisconsin
WRQX	600 AM	Salem, Ohio
WRRE	1460 AM	Juncos, Puerto Rico
WRRL	1130 AM	Rainelle, West Virginia
WRRZ	880 AM	Clinton, North Carolina
WRSB	1590 AM	Brockport, New York
WRSJ	1520 AM	San Juan, Puerto Rico
WRSO	810 AM	Orlo Vista, Florida
WRSS	1410 AM	San Sebastián, Puerto Rico
WRSW	1480 AM	Warsaw, Indiana
WRTA	1240 AM	Altoona, Pennsylvania
WRTG	1000 AM	Garner, North Carolina
WRTO	1200 AM	Chicago
WRTZ	1410 AM	Roanoke, Virginia
WRUF	850 AM	Gainesville, Florida
WRUS	610 AM	Russellville, Kentucky
WRVA	1140 AM	Richmond, Virginia
WRVC	930 AM	Huntington, West Virginia
WRVK	1460 AM	Mount Vernon, Kentucky
WRVP	1310 AM	Mt. Kisco, New York
WRWH	1350 AM	Cleveland, Georgia
WRXO	1430 AM	Roxboro, North Carolina
WRYM	840 AM	New Britain, Connecticut
WRYT	1080 AM	Edwardsville, Illinois
WRYU	1470 AM	West Bend, Wisconsin
WRZN	720 AM	Hernando, Florida
WRZX	1400 AM	Newnan, Georgia

== WS-- ==
Callsign	Frequency	City of license
WSAI	1360 AM	Cincinnati
WSAL	1230 AM	Logansport, Indiana
WSAM	1400 AM	Saginaw, Michigan
WSAN	1470 AM	Allentown, Pennsylvania
WSAR	1480 AM	Fall River, Massachusetts
WSAT	1280 AM	Salisbury, North Carolina
WSAU	550 AM	Wausau, Wisconsin
WSB	750 AM	Atlanta
WSBA	910 AM	York, Pennsylvania
WSBB	1230 AM	New Smyrna Beach, Florida
WSBC	1240 AM	Chicago
WSBI	1210 AM	Static, Tennessee
WSBM	1340 AM	Florence, Alabama
WSBN	630 AM	Washington, D.C.
WSBS	860 AM	Great Barrington, Massachusetts
WSBT	960 AM	South Bend, Indiana
WSBV	1560 AM	South Boston, Virginia
WSCO	1570 AM	Appleton, Wisconsin
WSCR	670 AM	Chicago
WSCW	1410 AM	South Charleston, West Virginia
WSDE	1190 AM	Cobleskill, New York
WSDK	1550 AM	Bloomfield, Connecticut
WSDO	1400 AM	Sanford, Florida
WSDQ	1190 AM	Dunlap, Tennessee
WSDR	1240 AM	Sterling, Illinois
WSDS	1480 AM	Salem Township, Michigan
WSDV	1450 AM	Sarasota, Florida
WSDZ	1260 AM	Belleville, Illinois
WSEG	1400 AM	Savannah, Georgia
WSEK	910 AM	Burnside, Kentucky
WSEV	930 AM	Sevierville, Tennessee
WSEZ	1560 AM	Paoli, Indiana
WSFB	1490 AM	Quitman, Georgia
WSFC	1240 AM	Somerset, Kentucky
WSFN	790 AM	Brunswick, Georgia
WSFW	1110 AM	Seneca Falls, New York
WSFS	950 AM	Chicago
WSFZ	930 AM	Jackson, Mississippi
WSGB	1490 AM	Sutton, West Virginia
WSGH	1040 AM	Lewisville, North Carolina
WSGI	1100 AM	Springfield, Tennessee
WSGO	1440 AM	Oswego, New York
WSGW	790 AM	Saginaw, Michigan
WSHE	820 AM	Frederick, Maryland
WSHO	800 AM	New Orleans, Louisiana
WSHU	1260 AM	Westport, Connecticut
WSHV	1370 AM	South Hill, Virginia
WSHY	1410 AM	Lafayette, Indiana
WSIC	1400 AM	Statesville, North Carolina
WSIP	1490 AM	Paintsville, Kentucky
WSIQ	1350 AM	Salem, Illinois
WSIR	1490 AM	Winter Haven, Florida
WSIV	1540 AM	East Syracuse, New York
WSJC	810 AM	Magee, Mississippi
WSJP	1640 AM	Sussex, Wisconsin
WSJS	600 AM	Winston-Salem, North Carolina
WSJW	550 AM	Pawtucket, Rhode Island
WSKI	1240 AM	Montpelier, Vermont
WSKN	1320 AM	San Juan, Puerto Rico
WSKO	1260 AM	Syracuse, New York
WSKP	1180 AM	Hope Valley, Rhode Island
WSKW	1160 AM	Skowhegan, Maine
WSKY	1230 AM	Asheville, North Carolina
WSLA	1560 AM	Slidell, Louisiana
WSLB	1400 AM	Ogdensburg, New York
WSLI	1480 AM	Kentwood, Michigan
WSLK	880 AM	Moneta, Virginia
WSLM	1220 AM	Salem, Indiana
WSLV	1110 AM	Ardmore, Tennessee
WSLW	1310 AM	White Sulphur Springs, West Virginia
WSM	650 AM	Nashville, Tennessee
WSME	1120 AM	Camp Lejeune, North Carolina
WSMG	1450 AM	Greeneville, Tennessee
WSMI	1540 AM	Litchfield, Illinois
WSML	1200 AM	Graham, North Carolina
WSMM	850 AM	Maryville, Tennessee
WSMN	1590 AM	Nashua, New Hampshire
WSMT	1050 AM	Sparta, Tennessee
WSMX	1500 AM	Winston-Salem, North Carolina
WSMY	1400 AM	Weldon, North Carolina
WSMZ	850 AM	Muskegon, Michigan
WSNG	610 AM	Torrington, Connecticut
WSNJ	1240 AM	Bridgeton, New Jersey
WSNL	600 AM	Flint, Michigan
WSNO	1450 AM	Barre, Vermont
WSNR	620 AM	Jersey City, New Jersey
WSNT	1490 AM	Sandersville, Georgia
WSNW	1150 AM	Seneca, South Carolina
WSOK	1230 AM	Savannah, Georgia
WSOL	1090 AM	San German, Puerto Rico
WSON	860 AM	Henderson, Kentucky
WSOO	1230 AM	Sault Ste. Marie, Michigan
WSOS	1170 AM	St. Augustine Beach, Florida
WSOY	1340 AM	Decatur, Illinois
WSPC	1010 AM	Albemarle, North Carolina
WSPD	1370 AM	Toledo, Ohio
WSPG	1400 AM	Spartanburg, South Carolina
WSPL	1250 AM	Streator, Illinois
WSPO	1390 AM	Charleston, South Carolina
WSPR	1490 AM	West Springfield, Massachusetts
WSQL	1240 AM	Brevard, North Carolina
WSQR	1180 AM	Sycamore, Illinois
WSRA	1250 AM	Albany, Georgia
WSRF	1580 AM	Fort Lauderdale, Florida
WSRO	650 AM	Ashland, Massachusetts
WSRP	910 AM	Jacksonville, North Carolina
WSRQ	1220 AM	Sarasota, Florida
WSRW	1590 AM	Hillsboro, Ohio
WSRY	1550 AM	Elkton, Maryland
WSSC	1340 AM	Sumter, South Carolina
WSSG	1300 AM	Goldsboro, North Carolina
WSSO	1230 AM	Starkville, Mississippi
WSSP	1250 AM	Milwaukee, Wisconsin
WSSV	1160 AM	Mechanicville, New York
WSTA	1340 AM	Charlotte Amalie, United States Virgin Islands
WSTC	1400 AM	Stamford, Connecticut
WSTJ	1340 AM	St. Johnsbury, Vermont
WSTL	1220 AM	Providence, Rhode Island
WSTP	1490 AM	Salisbury, North Carolina
WSTT	730 AM	Thomasville, Georgia
WSTU	1450 AM	Stuart, Florida
WSTX	970 AM	Christiansted, United States Virgin Islands
WSUA	1260 AM	Miami, Florida
WSUI	910 AM	Iowa City, Iowa
WSUX (AM)	1280 AM	Seaford, Delaware
WSVA	550 AM	Harrisonburg, Virginia
WSVM	1490 AM	Valdese, North Carolina
WSVS	800 AM	Crewe, Virginia
WSVU	960 AM	North Palm Beach, Florida
WSVX	1520 AM	Shelbyville, Indiana
WSWI	820 AM	Evansville, Indiana
WSWN	900 AM	Belle Glade, Florida
WSWV	1570 AM	Pennington Gap, Virginia
WSWW	1490 AM	Charleston, West Virginia
WSYB	1380 AM	Rutland, Vermont
WSYD	1300 AM	Mount Airy, North Carolina
WSYR	570 AM	Syracuse, New York
WSYW	810 AM	Indianapolis, Indiana
WSYY	1240 AM	Millinocket, Maine

== See also ==
- North American call sign
