= 1590 AM =

AM radio frequency

The following radio stations broadcast on AM frequency 1590 kHz: 1590 AM is a Regional broadcast frequency.

== Argentina ==
- LRI434 in Dolores, Buenos Aires.
- Serodino in Serodino, Santa Fe.
- Stentor in Buenos Aires.

== Colombia ==
- HJIP at Envigado

== Mexico ==
- XEVOZ-AM in Mexico City, licensed in Los Reyes Acaquilpan, State of Mexico

== United States ==
Call sign	City of license	Facility ID	Class	Daytime power (kW)	Nighttime power (kW)	Transmitter coordinates
KBHT	Mexia, Texas	21493	D	2.5	0.065	31.62°N 96.751667°W
KBJT	Fordyce, Arkansas	33663	D	4.7	0.035	33.802778°N 92.436111°W
KCTY	Wayne, Nebraska	35658	D	2.5	0.047	42.234444°N 97.055278°W
KDAE	Sinton, Texas	63346	B	1	0.5	28.021111°N 97.470556°W
KDAV	Lubbock, Texas	36953	B	1	1	33.520833°N 101.774167°W
KDEX	Dexter, Missouri	16831	D	0.62		36.788889°N 89.907778°W
KDJS	Willmar, Minnesota	33311	D	1	0.089	45.085278°N 95.005278°W
KELP	El Paso, Texas	40831	B	5	0.8	31.743889°N 106.395833°W
KGAS	Carthage, Texas	31065	D	2.5	0.128	32.153333°N 94.314444°W
KGFK	East Grand Forks, Minnesota	33000	B	5	1	47.878056°N 97.006667°W
KKAY	White Castle, Louisiana	36232	D	1	0.067	30.183611°N 91.1075°W
KLFE	Seattle, Washington	12031	B	20	5	47.655278°N 122.518333°W
KLIV	San Jose, California	19531	B	6.2	5	37.329167°N 121.856389°W
KMIC	Houston, Texas	20491	B	5	5	29.843889°N 95.4475°W
KMOZ	Rolla, Missouri	53651	D	1	0.085	37.944444°N 91.811667°W
KPRT	Kansas City, Missouri	9168	D	1	0.047	39.068056°N 94.536111°W
KTIL	Netarts, Oregon	50554	B	5	1	45.456944°N 123.871944°W
KVGB	Great Bend, Kansas	22150	B	5	5	38.313889°N 98.793056°W
KVTA	Ventura, California	7746	B	5	5	34.236944°N 119.2025°W
KVTR	Victorville, California	29226	D	0.5	0.131	34.5375°N 117.311667°W
KWBG	Boone, Iowa	22978	B	1	0.5	42.022778°N 93.876667°W
KWEY	Weatherford, Oklahoma	73948	D	1	0.032	35.559167°N 98.719722°W
KYNG	Springdale, Arkansas	71702	D	2.5	0.05	36.206667°N 94.119167°W
WABV	Abbeville, South Carolina	3152	D	1	0.027	34.150833°N 82.392778°W
WAKR	Akron, Ohio	43871	B	5	5	41.020556°N 81.505556°W
WALG	Albany, Georgia	54703	D	3.3	0.04	31.620833°N 84.153056°W
WARV	Warwick, Rhode Island	5882	B	8	5	41.727778°N 71.462778°W
WAUB	Auburn, New York	43791	B	0.45	1	42.909444°N 76.6025°W
WBHN	Bryson City, North Carolina	62338	D	0.5	0.037	35.428056°N 83.438333°W
WCAM	Camden, South Carolina	34294	D	1	0.027	34.223889°N 80.678611°W
WCGO	Evanston, Illinois	35447	B	10	2.5	42.021667°N 87.711389°W
WCSL	Cherryville, North Carolina	35656	D	10	0.03	35.374167°N 81.404444°W
WDBL	Springfield, Tennessee	15960	D	0.71	0.03	36.495°N 86.906111°W
WDJZ	South Daytona, Florida	53704	D	1	0.047	29.201667°N 81.024722°W
WFBR	Glen Burnie, Maryland	19673	B	1	1	39.176667°N 76.622222°W
WGBW	Denmark, Wisconsin	74127	B	10	0.5	44.313889°N 87.787778°W
WGGO	Salamanca, New York	9409	D	5	0.014	42.173333°N 78.685278°W
WHGT	Maugansville, Maryland	39494	D	15	0.058	39.806389°N 77.779167°W
WHOT	Palm River-Clair Mel, Florida	57478	B	9.8	0.16	27.947778°N 82.396389°W
WHPY	Clayton, North Carolina	30615	D	5	0.025	35.646944°N 78.505833°W
WIXK	New Richmond, Wisconsin	60643	D	5	0.095	45.086111°N 92.571944°W
WKTP	Jonesborough, Tennessee	27498	D	2.5	0.037	36.331667°N 82.474167°W
WLBN	Lebanon, Kentucky	36883	D	1	0.024	37.598611°N 85.246389°W
WNRN	Richmond, Virginia	67683	D	5	0.024	37.500556°N 77.457778°W
WNTS	Beech Grove, Indiana	58320	B	5	0.5	39.739167°N 86.091389°W (daytime); 39.739167°N 86.090556°W (nighttime)
WPIW	Mount Vernon, Indiana	53088	D	0.5	0.035	37.934167°N 87.928333°W
WPSL	Port St. Lucie, Florida	53044	D	5	0.063	27.307778°N 80.307222°W
WPSN	Honesdale, Pennsylvania	71345	D	2.5	0.015	41.553611°N 75.255°W
WPVL	Platteville, Wisconsin	35514	B	0.97	0.47	42.755556°N 90.505556°W
WQCH	Lafayette, Georgia	54912	D	5		34.715556°N 85.267778°W
WSMN	Nashua, New Hampshire	102	D	0.77	0.058	42.759444°N 71.476944°W
WSRW	Hillsboro, Ohio	65700	D	0.5	0.025	39.166111°N 83.606944°W
WTVB	Coldwater, Michigan	67757	B	5	1	41.909444°N 85.005833°W
WVNA	Tuscumbia, Alabama	19457	D	1	0.055	34.756667°N 87.686111°W
WVOE	Chadbourn, North Carolina	18419	D	1		34.351389°N 78.843889°W
WXRF	Guayama, Puerto Rico	25531	B	1	1	17.953611°N 66.114167°W
WXRS	Swainsboro, Georgia	36203	D	2.5	0.023	32.556944°N 82.341389°W
WYSR	High Point, North Carolina	34353	D	1.4	0.014	35.984444°N 80.068889°W
