= 1580 AM =

AM radio frequency

The following radio stations broadcast on AM frequency 1580 kHz: 1580 AM is a Canadian clear-channel frequency. See list of broadcast station classes.

== Argentina ==
- LT 36 in Chacabuco, Buenos Aires
- LT 27 in Villaguay, Entre Rios
- Tradición in San Martin
- 26 de Julio in Longchamps, Buenos Aires
- La Cueva in 25 de Mayo, Buenos Aires

== Canada ==
Stations in bold are clear-channel stations.

Call sign	City of license	Daytime power (kW)	Nighttime power (kW)	Transmitter coordinates
CBPK	Revelstoke, British Columbia	0.05	0.05	50.99°N 118.22°W
**CKDO**	Oshawa, Ontario	10	10	43.871944°N 78.764722°W

== Mexico ==
- XELI-AM in Chilpancingo, Guerrero

== United States ==
Call sign	City of license	Facility ID	Class	Daytime power (kW)	Nighttime power (kW)	Critical hours power (kW)	Transmitter coordinates
KAGE	Van Buren, Arkansas	52427	D	1	0.049		35.391667°N 94.331667°W
KAMI	Cozad, Nebraska	69845	D	1	0.017		40.837778°N 99.938889°W
KBLA	Santa Monica, California	34385	B	50	50		34.085556°N 118.256667°W
KCHA	Charles City, Iowa	41102	D	0.5	0.01		43.051389°N 92.666667°W
KDOM	Windom, Minnesota	72905	D	1	0.002		43.861389°N 95.097222°W
KFCS	Colorado Springs, Colorado	51816	D	10	0.14		38.719722°N 104.721111°W
KGAF	Gainesville, Texas	21600	B	1.2	0.28		33.628611°N 97.107222°W
KGAL	Lebanon, Oregon	18039	B	5	1		44.573611°N 122.918056°W
KIRT	Mission, Texas	56474	B	1	0.302		26.293333°N 98.330556°W
KKTS	Evansville, Wyoming	161152	B	1	0.22		42.881667°N 106.286944°W
KNIM	Maryville, Missouri	48973	D	0.48	0.01		40.391944°N 94.967778°W
KOKB	Blackwell, Oklahoma	43733	D	1	0.049		36.809722°N 97.263889°W
KQFN	Tempe, Arizona	7701	D	24	0.245		33.493333°N 112.138333°W
KTGR	Columbia, Missouri	74584	D	0.214	0.008		38.9625°N 92.303889°W
KWED	Seguin, Texas	52671	B	1.45	0.3		29.58°N 97.984722°W
KWLO	Springville, Utah	161249	B	1	0.38		40.206111°N 111.669722°W
WAMW	Washington, Indiana	25210	D	0.5			38.645833°N 87.279444°W
WAMY	Amory, Mississippi	62223	D	1	0.018		33.975833°N 88.491389°W
WBQN	Aguadilla, Puerto Rico	72452	B	1	1		18.4025°N 66.146667°W
WCCF	Punta Gorda, Florida	28897	B	1.25	0.11		26.893611°N 82.050833°W
WDQN	DuQuoin, Illinois	17748	D	0.17	0.007		38.032222°N 89.241667°W
WESY	Leland, Mississippi	18211	D	1	0.048		33.379444°N 90.929722°W
WGYM	Hammonton, New Jersey	61110	D	1	0.006		39.625833°N 74.795556°W
WHLY	South Bend, Indiana	67133	B	1	0.5		41.685833°N 86.164722°W
WIOL	Columbus, Georgia	47088	D	2.1	0.045		32.451944°N 84.973611°W
WJFK	Morningside, Maryland	28638	B	50	0.27		38.869167°N 76.896389°W
WJXO	Chattahoochee, Florida	37471	D	10			30.670556°N 84.835556°W
WLIJ	Shelbyville, Tennessee	27632	D	5	0.012		35.455278°N 86.451944°W
WLPK	Connersville, Indiana	57352	D	0.245	0.005		39.6375°N 85.145833°W
WMDX	Columbus, Wisconsin	71092	D	5	0.004	0.8	43.334722°N 89.165556°W (daytime); 43.334167°N 89.165833°W (nighttime and critical hours)
WNPZ	Knoxville, Tennessee	11191	D	5		1	35.911667°N 83.8925°W
WNTF	Bithlo, Florida	14556	D	10			28.536389°N 81.085°W
WNYG	Patchogue, New York	38333	D	10	0.004		40.795833°N 72.992222°W
WPGY	Ellijay, Georgia	36891	D	0.5			34.699167°N 84.478333°W
WPJK	Orangeburg, South Carolina	6447	D	3.3	0.022		33.498611°N 80.8425°W
WPKY	Princeton, Kentucky	50637	D	0.25	0.009		37.120556°N 87.858611°W
WPMO	Pascagoula-Moss Point, Mississippi	32850	D	5	0.051		30.383611°N 88.535278°W
WSRF	Fort Lauderdale, Florida	67194	B	10	1.5		26.0775°N 80.2175°W
WTAZ	Oxford, Alabama	73608	D	2.5	0.022		33.590833°N 85.831667°W (daytime); 33.448611°N 86.065°W (nighttime)
WVZN	Columbia, Pennsylvania	25819	D	0.5	0.005		40.025278°N 76.475278°W
WWDN	Danville, Virginia	67269	D	1			36.5675°N 79.380556°W
WWSJ	St. Johns, Michigan	74002	D	1	0.003		42.970556°N 84.549722°W
WWTF	Georgetown, Kentucky	34246	D	10	0.045		38.168056°N 84.593611°W
WXGT	Columbus, Ohio	22341	B	3.2	0.29		40.061667°N 82.944722°W
WZKY	Albemarle, North Carolina	49044	D	1	0.012		35.360556°N 80.1775°W
