= 1947 in radio =

The year 1947 saw a number of significant happenings in radio broadcasting history.

== Events ==
- 10 February – Nederlandse Radio Unie is established.
- 13 February – Wolfgang Borchert's play The Man Outside (Draußen vor der Tür) premieres on German radio.
- 17 February – Voice of America begins shortwave radio transmissions to the Soviet Union.
- 19 February – CBS Radio premiere performance of Villa-Lobos' Bachianas Brasileiras No. 3.
- 16 March – Margaret Truman, daughter of US President Harry S. Truman, performs in her vocal debut on national radio.
- 15 April – Operations begin at Radio Netherlands World radio.
- 21 April – On her 21st birthday, a speech by Princess Elizabeth, the future Queen Elizabeth II, is broadcast from Cape Town (where the royal family is on tour), delivering a pledge of service to the British Commonwealth.
- 1 June – Publication of the first number of Radio Nacional de España's fortnightly programme magazine Sintonía.
- 2 June – The Guiding Light is revived by CBS Radio after being canceled by NBC Radio the previous November. CBS would air "TGL" until 2009 on both radio and television.
- 20 October – Radio rights for the World Series in North American baseball sell for $475,000 for 3 years.
- 24 October – Francis Poulenc's Sinfonietta receives its world premiere in a broadcast concert from London having been commissioned by the BBC for the first anniversary of their Third Programme.
- 18 November – The BBC links up with stations around the globe in the programme BBC Covers the World.
- (date unknown) – Philco Radio Time starring Bing Crosby, on the ABC Radio network, introduces taped broadcasting to primetime network radio. The show has formerly been recorded on large wax transcription disks.

== Debuts ==
=== Programs ===
- 2 January – Much-Binding-in-the-Marsh, having started out as a recurring sketch in the wartime comedy-variety show Merry-go-round (from 31 March 1944), debuts on the BBC Light Programme.
- 11 January – The Amazing Mr. Malone debuts on ABC.
- 19 January – Official Detective debuts on Mutual.
- 26 January – The Greatest Story Ever Told debuts on ABC.
- 27 January – Bob and Victoria debuts on CBS.
- 13 February – Family Theater (1947–1957) debuts on Mutual.
- 28 February – Twenty Questions debuts on BBC radio.
- 2 April – The Big Story debuts on NBC.
- 9 April – How Does Your Garden Grow? debuts on BBC radio; as Gardeners' Question Time it will still be running more than 65 years later.
- 26 April – The Bill Goodwin Show debuts on CBS.
- 3 June – Call the Police debuts on NBC.
- 17 June – The Adventures of Philip Marlowe debuts on NBC.
- 23 June – Wendy Warren and the News debuts on CBS.
- 28 June – The Candid Microphone debuts on ABC.
- 29 June – Strike It Rich debuts on CBS.
- 7 July – Escape premieres on CBS.
- 26 July – The Abe Burrows Show debuts on CBS.
- 23 September - The Zane Grey Show debuts on Mutual.
- 28 September – The Adventures of Christopher Wells debuts on CBS.
- 5 October - Ford Theater debuts on NBC.
- 6 October – Philip Odell, a fictional detective created by Lester Powell and played by Canadian actor Robert Beatty, is heard for the first time on BBC radio in Lady in a Fog.
- 11 October – Joan Davis Time debuts on CBS.
- 26 October - Child's World debuts on ABC.
- 27 October – You Bet Your Life, with Groucho Marx, premieres on ABC radio in the U.S.
- 2 November – Round Britain Quiz debuts on BBC radio.

=== Stations ===
- January 6 - KWPC, Muscatine, Iowa, begins broadcasting on 860 kHz with 250 W power (daytime only).
- February – WBPZ, Lock Haven, Pennsylvania, begins broadcasting as a Mutual affiliate on 1230 kHz with 250 W of power.
- 31 March – WNBD-FM, Daytona Beach, Florida, begins broadcast operations.
- 4 April – WSVS, Crewe, Virginia, begins broadcasting on a frequency of 650 kHz.
- 5 April – WRRZ, Clinton, North Carolina, begins broadcast operations on 880 kHz. with 1 KW of power.
- 10 April – KCNA begins broadcasting on 580 Kcs in Tucson, Arizona.
- 20 April – WMLO, Milwaukee, Wisconsin, begins broadcasting on 1290 kHz with 1 kW of power.
- 23 April – WFNS-FM, Burlington, North Carolina, begins broadcasting.
- 27 April – WFAK, Charleston, South Carolina, begins broadcasting on 730 kHz with 1 kW of power.
- 27 April – WEEK, Peoria, Illinois, begins broadcasting on 1350 kHz with 1 kW of power.
- 30 April – WMCK, Pittsburgh, begins broadcasting on 1360 kHz.
- 3 May – WSIC (1400 kHz, 250 W) and WSIC-FM (96.5 MHz), Statesville, North Carolina, begin broadcasting simultaneously with WSIC a Mutual affiliate and WSIC-FM duplicating the AM station's programming.
- 5 May – WRON, Ronceverte, West Virginia, begins broadcasting as a Mutual affiliate on 1400 kHz with 250 W of power.
- 9 May – KPBX, Beaumont, Texas, begins broadcasting on 1380 kHz.
- 12 May – KATL, Houston, Texas, begins broadcasting on 1590 kHz with 1 KW of power.
- 14 May – KULA, Honolulu, begins broadcasting as an ABC affiliate.
- 16 May – KDIX, Dickinson, North Dakota, begins broadcasting on 1230 kHz with 250 W of power.
- 18 May – WATG-FM, Ashland, Ohio, begins broadcasting on 100.7 MHz.
- 23 May – WNAM, Neenah-Menasha, Wisconsin, begins broadcasting on 1280 kHz with 1 KW power.
- 30 May – WMID, Atlantic City, New Jersey, begins broadcasting as a Mutual affiliate on 1340 kHz with 250 W power.
- 1 June – WJMO, Cleveland, Ohio, begins broadcasting on 1540 MHz with 1 KW of power.
- 2 June – WTMA-FM, Charleston, South Carolina, begins broadcasting on 95.1 MHz. with 1 KW of power.
- 3 June – WHPE, High Point, North Carolina, begins broadcasting on 1070 kHz with 1 KW of power.
- 7 June – WDIA, Memphis, Tennessee, begins broadcasting on 730 kHz with 250 W power.
- 8 June – WMMW, Meriden, Connecticut, begins broadcasting on 1470 kHz with 1 KW power.
- 12 June – KWSD, Mount Shasta, California, begins broadcasting on 1340 kHz with 250 W of power.
- 14 June – KVOW, Littlefield, Texas, begins broadcasting on 1490 kHz with 250 W of power.
- 15 June – KWBW-FM, Hutchinson, Kansas, begins broadcasting on 95.7 MHz, becoming the first commercial FM station in central Kansas.
- 18 June – WRTA, Altoona, Pennsylvania, begins broadcasting as an ABC affiliate on 1240 kHz with 250 W power.
- 20 June – WLCX, La Crosse, Wisconsin, begins broadcasting on 1490 kHz with 250 W power.
- 22 June – KOOL, Phoenix, Arizona, begins broadcasting as a Mutual-Don Lee affiliate on 960 kHz with 5 KW power.
- 23 June – WJHP-FM, Jacksonville, Florida, begins broadcasting.
- 27 June – WKBC, North Wilkesboro, North Carolina, begins broadcasting on 810 kHz with 1 KW power.
- 29 June – WDVA, Danville, Virginia begins broadcasting on 1250 kHz.
- 30 June – KRTH-FM, Houston, Texas, begins broadcasting on 101.1 MHz.
- 30 June – KIJV, Huron, South Dakota, begins broadcasting as a Mutual affiliate on 1340 kHz with 250 W power.
- 1 July – KRON-FM, San Francisco, California, begins broadcasting at 96.5 MHz.
- 1 July – WILX, North Wilkesboro, North Carolina, begins broadcasting as a Mutual affiliate on 1450 kHz with 250 W power.
- 1 July – WIRK, West Palm Beach, Florida, begins broadcasting on 1290 kHz with 1 KW power.
- 21 July – KBUR-FM, Burlington, Iowa, begins broadcasting on 92.9 MHz.
- 30 July – KOWL, Santa Monica, California, begins broadcasting on 1580 kHz with 5 KW power.
- July – KROS-FM, Clinton, Iowa, at 96.1 FM, with 13 kW power.
- 1 August – WEBJ, Brewton, Alabama, begins broadcasting on 1240 kHz with 250 W power.
- 3 August – KVER, Albuquerque, New Mexico, begins broadcasting on 1490 kHz with 250 W power.
- 4 August – WIKY, Evansville, Indiana, begins broadcasting on 820 kHz with 250 W power.
- 8 August – WIMS, Michigan City, Indiana, begins broadcasting on 1420 kHz with 1 KW power.
- 10 August – KRUL, Corvallis, Oregon, begins broadcasting on 1340 kHz with 250 W.
- 10 August – WFTW, Fort Wayne, Indiana, begins broadcasting on 1090 kHz with 1 KW power.
- 11 August – KOLN, Lincoln, Nebraska, begins broadcasting as a Mutual affiliate on 1400 kHz with 250 W power.
- 11 August – WLOS, Asheville, North Carolina, begins broadcasting on 1380 kHz with power of 5 KW (daytime) and 1 KW (night).
- 13 August – WJPG-FM (now WIXX-FM), Green Bay, Wisconsin, begins broadcasting on 101.1 MHz.
- 15 August – KSEI-FM, Pocatello, Idaho, begins broadcasting on 96.5 MHz.
- 15 August – KTIL, Tillamook, Oregon, begins broadcasting on 1590 kHz with 250 W power.
- 17 August – WPDX, Clarksburg, West Virginia, begins broadcasting on 750 kHz with 1 KW power, daytime only.
- August – WIBV, Belleville, Illinois, begins broadcasting on 1060 kHz with 250 W power.
- 1 September – WWVA-FM, Wheeling, West Virginia, begins broadcasting on 98.7 MHz.
- 10 September – WHCC, Waynesville, North Carolina, begins broadcasting on 1400 kHz with 250 W power.
- 14 September – WRFD, Worthington, Ohio, begins broadcasting on 880 kHz with 5 KW power (daytime only).
- 14 September – KWBR-FM, San Francisco, California, is dedicated, broadcasting on 97.3 MHz.
- 14 September – KDYL-FM, Salt Lake City, Utah, begins broadcasting on 98.7 MHz.
- 19 September – KONG-FM, Alameda, California, begins broadcasting on 104.9 MHz.
- 21 September – KSLO, Opelousas, Louisiana, begins broadcasting on 1230 kHz with 250 W power.
- 29 September – WNMP, Evanston, Illinois, begins broadcasting on 1590 kHz with 1 KW power.
- September – WTNC, Thomasville, North Carolina, begins broadcasting on 790 kHz with 1 KW power.
- 4 October – WGBA, Columbus, Georgia, begins broadcasting on 620 kHz with 1 KW power.
- 5 October – WSWN, Belle Glade, Florida, begins broadcasting on 900 kHz with 1 KW power.
- 5 October – WBYS, Canton, Illinois, begins broadcasting on 1560 kHz with 250 W power (daytime only).
- 5 October – WLAD, Danbury, Connecticut, begins broadcasting on 800 kHz with 250 W power (daytime only).
- 5 October – KSBS, Kansas City, Kansas, begins broadcasting on 105.9 MHz.
- 8 October – KUSN, San Diego, California, begins broadcasting on 1510 kHz with 5 KW daytime and 1 KW nighttime power.
- 8 October – KTXL, San Angelo, Texas, begins broadcasting as a Mutual affiliate on 1340 kHz with 250 W power (full-time).
- 13 October – WBBC, Flint, Michigan, begins broadcasting on 1330 kHz with 1 KW power full-time.
- 15 October – KYNO, Fresno, California, begins broadcasting on 1300 kHz with 1 KW power full-time.
- 15 October – KWIL-FM, Albany, Oregon, begins broadcasting on 101.7 MHz.
- 15 October – WKPB, Knoxville, Tennessee, begins broadcasting on 93.3 MHz.
- 19 October – KGIL, San Fernando, California, begins broadcasting on 1260 kHz with 1 KW power full-time.
- 19 October – KURV, Edinburg, Texas, begins broadcasting on 710 kHz with 250 W power (daytime only).
- 19 October – WPGH, Pittsburgh, Pennsylvania, begins broadcasting on 1080 kHz with 1 KW power (daytime only).
- 19 October – KOKX, Keokuk, Iowa, begins broadcasting on 1310 kHz with 250 W power (daytime only).
- 21 October – WHUC, Hudson, New York, begins broadcasting on 1230 kHz with 250 W power.
- 22 October – WJTN-FM begins broadcasting on 93.3 MHz.
- 22 October – KSFH-FM, San Francisco, California, begins broadcasting on 94.9 MHz.
- 26 October – KVFD-FM, Fort Dodge, Iowa, begins broadcasting on 102.7 MHz.
- 27 October – WMBM, Miami Beach, Florida, begins broadcasting on 800 kHz with 1 KW power.
- 28 October – WFRL, Freeport, Illinois, begins broadcasting on 1570 kHz with 1 KW power.
- 28 October – WHBF-FM, Rock Island, Illinois, begins broadcasting on 98.9 MHz.
- 29 October – KBMT-FM, San Bernardino, California, begins broadcasting on 99.9 MHz.
- (undated) November – WKLF begins broadcasting on 980 kHz with 1 KW power.
- (undated) November – WSID, Baltimore, Maryland, begins broadcasting on 1570 kHz with 1 KW power.
- 1 November – WSLQ-FM, Roanoke, Virginia, begins broadcasting as WSLS on 99.1 MHz with 4,700 watts of power.
- 2 November – WCEC and WCEC-FM, Rocky Mount, North Carolina, begins broadcasting—the AM station on 810 kHz with 1 KW power (daytime only) and the FM station at 100.7 MHz.
- 3 November – KGO-FM, San Francisco, California, begins broadcasting on 106.1 MHz.
- 8 November – WGST-FM, Atlanta, Georgia, begins broadcasting on 94.1 MHz.
- 8 November – KRUS, Ruston, Louisiana, begins broadcasting as a Mutual affiliate on 1490 kHz with 250 W power (full-time).
- 9 November – KLIF, Dallas, Texas, begins broadcasting on 1190 kHz with 1 KW power.
- 10 November – WLAW-FM, Lawrence, Massachusetts, begins broadcasting on 93.7 MHz.
- 10 November – WHMA-FM, Anniston, Alabama, begins broadcasting on 100.5 MHz.
- 16 November – WJPD, Ishpeming, Michigan, begins broadcasting on 1240 kHz with 250 W power (full-time).
- 16 November – KXEL-FM, Waterloo, Iowa, begins broadcasting on 105.7 MHz.
- 16 November – KCRK, Cedar Rapids, Iowa, begins broadcasting on 96.9 MHz.
- 17 November – KVNJ-FM, Fargo, North Dakota, begins broadcasting on 92.3 MHz.
- 20 November – WJLK-FM, Asbury Park, New Jersey, begins broadcasting on 104.7 MHz.
- 26 November – WVLK, Versailles, Kentucky, begins broadcasting as a Mutual affiliate on 1500 kHz with 1 KW power (full-time).
- 27 November – WBMD, Baltimore, Maryland, begins broadcasting on 750 kHz with 1 KW power (daytime only).
- 29 November – WTRF, Wheeling, West Virginia, begins broadcasting as a Mutual affiliate on 1290 kHz with 1 KW power.
- 29 November – WTRF-FM, Wheeling, West Virginia, begins broadcasting on Channel 236.
- (undated) December – WBOW-FM begins broadcasting on 101.1 MHz.
- 1 December – WAFM, Birmingham, Alabama, begins broadcasting on 99.5 MHz.
- 1 December – WSJS-FM, Winston-Salem, North Carolina, begins broadcasting on 104.1 MHz.
- 2 December – KREL, Goose Creek, Texas, begins broadcasting on 1360 kHz with 1 KW power (full-time).
- 3 December – KSET, El Paso, Texas, begins broadcasting on 1340 kHz at 250 W (full-time).
- 5 December – WHOO, Orlando, Florida, begins broadcasting as an ABC affiliate on 990 kHz with 10 kW power (daytime only).
- 5 December – WTTH, Port Huron, Michigan, begins broadcasting on 1360 kHz with 1 KW power (daytime only).
- 5 December – WTTH-FM, Port Huron, Michigan, begins broadcasting on 99.1 MHz.
- 7 December – WSKI, Montpelier, Vermont, begins broadcasting on 1240 kHz with 250 W power.
- 7 December – KFRM, Concordia, Kansas, begins broadcasting on 550 kHz with 5 KW power. All of its programming originated in the studios of KMBC, Kansas City, Missouri—the first arrangement of its kind to be licensed by the Federal Communications Commission.
- 7 December – WHVA-FM, Poughkeepsie, New York, begins broadcasting on 104.7 MHz.
- 7 December – WLEC, Sandusky, Ohio, begins broadcasting on 1450 kHz with 250 W power (full-time).
- 12 December – KXAR, Hope, Arkansas, begins broadcasting as a Mutual affiliate on 1490 kHz with 250 W power.
- 14 December – WCAV, Norfolk, Virginia, begins broadcasting on 860 kHz with 1 KW power (daytime).
- 17 December – KVON, Napa, California, begins broadcasting on 1440 kHz with 500 W power (full-time).
- 20 December – KCRG, Cedar Rapids, Iowa, begins broadcasting on 1600 kHz with 5 KW power.
- 21 December – WSGN-FM, Birmingham, Alabama, begins broadcasting on 93.7 MHz.
- 21 December – WHBS-FM, Huntsville, Alabama, begins broadcasting on 95.1 MHz.
- 25 December – KURV-FM, Edinburg, Texas, begins broadcasting on 104.9 MHz with 1 KW effective radiated power.
- 29 December – WKAT-FM, Miami Beach, Florida, begins broadcasting on 93.1 MHz.
- 31 December – WOPT-FM, Oswego, New York, begins broadcasting on 104.7 MHz.

== Endings ==
- 26 February – The Cresta Blanca Hollywood Players ends its run on network radio (CBS).
- 23 March – The Eddie Bracken Show ends its run on network radio (CBS).
- 28 March – Buck Rogers in the 25th Century ends its run on network radio (Mutual).
- 28 March – Sparkle Time ends its run on network radio (CBS).
- 2 April – Author Meets the Critics ends its run on network radio (Mutual).
- 6 April – The Court of Missing Heirs ends its run on network radio (ABC).old-time radio
- 13 April – Danger, Dr. Danfield ends its run on network radio (ABC).
- 4 June – The second version of Songs by Sinatra ends its run on network radio (CBS).
- 11 June – The Ford Show ends its run on network radio (CBS).
- 23 June – Joanie's Tea Room ends its run on network radio (CBS).
- 27 June – Bob and Victoria ends its run on network radio (CBS).
- 25 August – Alec Templeton Time ends its run on network radio (NBC).
- 31 August – Abbott Mysteries ends its run on Mutual.
- 16 October – Crime Club ends its run on network radio (Mutual).
- 21 November - Mystery of the Week ends its run on network radio (CBS).
- 13 December – The Bill Goodwin Show ends its run on network radio (CBS).
- 22 October – The Affairs of Ann Scotland ends its run on network radio (ABC).

== Births ==
- 1 March – Mike Read, British DJ
- 2 March – Joe Castiglione, announcer for the Boston Red Sox, author and college lecturer
- 17 June – Linda Chavez, Hispanic-American conservative author, commentator, and talk show host
- 28 June – Gerry Northam, English radio presenter
- 5 August – Robert Krulwich, American topical broadcast presenter
- 1 October – Jane Dornacker (died 1986), American rock musician, actress, comedian and WNBC traffic reporter; killed in helicopter crash while live on air
- 20 November – Citizen Kafka (died 2009), New York City-based radio personality and folk musician
- 11 December – Steve Curwood, American journalist, author, public radio personality and actor
- Natalie Wheen, English arts presenter
- Peter White, blind English radio presenter

== Deaths ==
- 24 July – Ernest Austin, English composer, arranger and songwriter associated with the Henry Wood Promenade Concerts (born 1874)
