= WRON =

WRON may refer to:

- WRON (AM), a radio station (1400 AM) licensed to serve Ronceverte, West Virginia, United States
- WRON-FM, a radio station (103.1 FM) licensed to serve Lewisburg, West Virginia
- Military Council of National Salvation, a military junta in Poland
