= WJAT =

- Swainsboro, Georgia; United States
- Frequency: 800 kHz
- Branding: The Patriot 800 AM★FM 99.1

Programming
- Format: News Talk Information
- Affiliations: Fox News Radio; Fox Sports Radio; Premiere Networks

Ownership
- Owner: Radiojones, LLC
- Sister stations: WEDB, WXRS, WXRS-FM

Technical information
- Licensing authority: FCC
- Facility ID: 54809
- Class: B
- Power: 1,000 watts day 500 watts night
- Transmitter coordinates: 32°34′55″N 82°21′22″W
- Translator: 95.3 W237EZ (Swainsboro)

Links
- Public license information: Public file; LMS
- Webcast: Listen Live
- Website: am800wjat.com

WJAT (800 AM) is a radio station broadcasting a News Talk Information format. It is licensed to Swainsboro, Georgia, United States. The station is currently owned by Radiojones, LLC and features programming from Fox News Radio, Fox Sports Radio, and Premiere Networks.
