= WXRS =

WXRS may refer to:

- WXRS (AM), a radio station (1590 AM) licensed to Swainsboro, Georgia, United States
- WXRS-FM, a radio station (100.5 FM) licensed to Swainsboro, Georgia, United States
