= WPSL =

WPSL may refer to:

- National Pro Fastpitch, formerly known as the Women's Pro Softball League
- Women's Premier Soccer League
- WPSL (AM), a radio station (1590 AM) licensed to Port St. Lucie, Florida, United States
