= WISL =

WISL may refer to:

- Western Indoor Soccer League, a United States indoor soccer league (2014–present)
- World Indoor Soccer League, a United States indoor soccer league (1998–2001)
- WISL (AM), a defunct AM radio station located in Shamokin, Pennsylvania
- Where Is the Love?, a song by Hip-Hop group The Black Eyed Peas
