= WLEJ =

WLEJ may refer to:

- WLEJ (AM), a radio station (1450 AM) licensed to serve State College, Pennsylvania, United States
- WFXS (FM), a radio station (98.7 FM) licensed to serve Pleasant Gap, Pennsylvania, which held the call sign WLEJ-FM in 2023
- WPGY, a radio station (1580 AM) licensed to serve Ellijay, Georgia, United States, which held the call sign WLEJ from 1978 to 1986
