= WHPY =

WHPY may refer to:

- WHPY (AM), a radio station (1590 AM) licensed to serve Clayton, North Carolina, United States
- WHPY-FM, a radio station (94.5 FM) licensed to serve Bellevue, Tennessee, United States
