= WSOL =

WSOL may refer to:

- WSOL (AM), a radio station (1090 AM) licensed to serve San German, Puerto Rico
- WSOL-FM, a radio station (101.5 FM) licensed to serve Yulee, Florida, United States
