= WKSB =

- Williamsport, Pennsylvania; United States
- Broadcast area: Central Pennsylvania; Susquehanna Valley
- Frequency: 102.7 MHz
- Branding: KISS 102-7

Programming
- Language: English
- Format: Adult contemporary
- Affiliations: iHeartRadio; Penn State Nittany Lions; Premiere Networks

Ownership
- Owner: iHeartMedia; (iHM Licenses, LLC)
- Sister stations: WBYL; WBLJ-FM; WRKK; WRAK; WVRT; WVRZ

History
- First air date: April 1, 1948
- Former call signs: WRAK-FM (1944–1980)
- Former frequencies: 47.7 MHz (1944–1945) (CP); 92.5 MHz (1945–1947) (CP); 100.3 MHz (1947–1959)

Technical information
- Licensing authority: FCC
- Facility ID: 15326
- Class: B
- ERP: 53,000 watts
- HAAT: 387 meters (1,270 ft)
- Transmitter coordinates: 41°11′21.30″N 76°58′51.90″W

Links
- Public license information: Public file; LMS
- Webcast: Listen live (via iHeartRadio)
- Website: kiss1027fm.iheart.com

WKSB (102.7 MHz, "Kiss 102-7") is a commercial FM radio station licensed to serve Williamsport, Pennsylvania. The station is owned by iHeartMedia, Inc., through licensee iHM Licenses, LLC, and broadcasts an adult contemporary format, switching to Christmas music for much of November and December. Its broadcast tower is located on Bald Eagle Mountain south of Williamsport at (41°11′24.7″N 76°58′46.2″W).

WKSB is a grandfathered "superpower" station. The station's effective radiated power (ERP) exceeds the maximum limit allowed for a Class B FM station, and is also far above the maximum allowable ERP for its antenna height above average terrain (HAAT) according to current FCC rules.

== History ==
On May 29, 1944, WRAK, Inc. applied to the Federal Communications Commission (FCC) for a construction permit for a new FM station on 47.7 MHz on the original 42-50 MHz FM broadcast band. On June 27, 1945, the FCC created the current FM broadcast band. On November 21, 1945, the FCC granted the construction permit by which time the commission had assigned the WRAK-FM call sign to the station. On that same day, the commission reassigned the station to 92.5 MHz and WRAK, Inc. applied for a new construction permit for operation on the new frequency. On February 27, 1947, the FCC reassigned the station to 100.3 MHz and modified the construction permit. The FCC granted the station authority to begin broadcasting on February 26, 1948 followed by its first license on August 13, 1948.

On September 15, 1956, the station's license was voluntarily reassigned to WGAL, Inc. The sale consummated on February 6, 1957.

On October 30, 1959, the FCC granted WGAL, Inc. a new construction permit for operation on 102.7 MHz. The permit allowed the station to increase its effective radiated power (ERP) to 53,000 watts with an antenna height above average terrain (HAAT) of 1,260 feet. On August 1, 1962, the station's license and construction permit were voluntarily reassigned to Wright Mackey Corporation. The sale consummated on November 8, 1962. The FCC granted the station a new license with the new facilities, while increasing the HAAT to 1,270 feet, on August 1, 1963.

On March 7, 1979, the station's license was voluntarily reassigned to Stainless Broadcasting Company. The FCC approved the sale on September 13, 1979. Following the sale, the call sign was changed to WKSB on February 19, 1980.

former logo
