= WRON (AM) =

- Ronceverte, West Virginia; United States
- Broadcast area: Ronceverte, West Virginia; Lewisburg, West Virginia
- Frequency: 1400 kHz

Ownership
- Owner: Radio Greenbrier, LLC
- Sister stations: WKCJ; WRLB; WRON-FM; WSLW

History
- First air date: May 5, 1947
- Last air date: July 21, 2025
- Call sign meaning: Ronceverte

Technical information
- Facility ID: 54596
- Class: C
- Power: 1,000 watts (unlimited)
- Transmitter coordinates: 37°45′36.4″N 80°27′17.3″W
- Translator: 100.9 W265DX (Lewisburg)

WRON was a news/talk formatted broadcast radio station licensed to Ronceverte, West Virginia, serving Ronceverte and Lewisburg in West Virginia. WRON was owned and operated by Radio Greenbrier, LLC.

== History ==
WRON began broadcasting May 5, 1947, as a Mutual affiliate on 1400 kHz with 250 watts of power. The station was started by Bill Blake, who returned to Ronceverte after serving in World War II.

The Federal Communications Commission cancelled the station’s license on July 21, 2025.
