= WOEZ =

WOEZ may refer to:

== Radio stations ==
- WOEZ (FM), a radio station (93.7 FM) licensed to Burton, South Carolina
- WWMK (FM), a radio station (106.3 FM) licensed to Onaway, Michigan, which held the call sign WOEZ from 2013 to 2017
- WSBX (FM), a radio station (94.5 FM) licensed to Mackinaw City, Michigan, which held the call sign WOEZ from 2012 to 2013
- WYLV, a radio station (88.3 FM) licensed to Maynardville, Tennessee, which held the call sign WOEZ from 2001 to 2008
- WPSP, a radio station (1190 AM) licensed to Royal Palm Beach, Florida, which held the call sign WOEZ from 1989 to 1995

== Other ==
- Woez, a part of the municipality Wittendörp in the district of Ludwigslust-Parchim in Mecklenburg-Vorpommern, Germany
