= WNTC (AM) =

Radio station in Ashland City, Tennessee

Coordinates: 36°17′8″N 87°4′58″W

- Ashland City, Tennessee; United States
- Broadcast area: Clarksville, Tennessee; Nashville, Tennessee
- Frequency: 790 kHz
- Branding: 790 AM & 99.1 FM The Gospel

Programming
- Format: Urban gospel
- Affiliations: American Urban Radio Networks

Ownership
- Owner: Randolph Bell; (The Mighty Seven Ninety Incorporated)

History
- First air date: July 14, 1982 (as WAJN)
- Former call signs: WAJN (1981–1991); WQSV (1991–2013); WJNA (2013–2019); WVWK (2019); WBWR (2019–2020); WVWZ (2020-21); WCHQ (2021)

Technical information
- Licensing authority: FCC
- Facility ID: 64336
- Class: D
- Power: 2,000 watts day 35 watts night
- Translator: 99.1 W256ED (Nashville)

Links
- Public license information: Public file; LMS
- Website: thegospelnashville.com

WNTC (790 kHz) is an AM radio station broadcasting in Ashland City, Tennessee, United States, which broadcasts an urban gospel format branded as 790 AM & 99.1 FM The Gospel. Day power is 2,000 watts and night power is 35 watts.

== FM translator ==
WNTC relays its programming to an FM translator in order to widen the coverage area, especially during nighttime hours when the AM frequency decreases power to 35 watts.

Call sign	Frequency	City of license	FID	ERP (W)	Class	FCC info
W256ED	99.1 FM	Nashville, Tennessee	200720	250	D	LMS

== History ==
There have been several callsigns and formats over the years; the current one consists of Mainstream County and is the Flagship for Cheatham County Central High School Sports.

The then-WQSV signed off on June 8, 2013 due to insufficient advertising support from area businesses. The station's studio and transmitter site were sold in a foreclosure sale to Community Bank & Trust on June 14. A deal was reached to sell WQSV to Lightning Broadcasting in September 2013; Lightning is controlled by Neil Peterson, who also owns WSGI and WDBL in Springfield. The station changed its call sign to WJNA on December 9, 2013.

On February 7, 2019, Fowler Media Partners began operating WJNA under a local marketing agreement and changed the station's format from southern gospel to classic country, simulcasting WVWF 105.1 FM Waverly, under new WVWK call letters. The station has since relaunched separate original programming under the brand name The Bear.

On June 26, 2019, the station changed its call sign to WBWR. The next day, owner Sycamore Valley Broadcasting closed on the sale of the station and the W280FN translator to Mike Parchman's Consolidated Media LLC at a purchase price of $100,000.

On January 9, 2020, the station changed its call sign to WVWZ. On February 22, 2021, the station changed its call sign to WCHQ and rebranded as "Q Country 103.9". The call sign changed again to WNTC on July 22.

Effective October 14, 2021, Consolidated Media sold WNTC and translator W280FN to The Mighty Seven Ninety Incorporated.

The station now airs an Urban Gospel format as "790 AM & 104.9 FM The Gospel" moved over from WENO AM 760
