= WVRZ =

Coordinates: 40.819°N 76.462°W

Simulcast of WVRT 99.7 Mill Hall
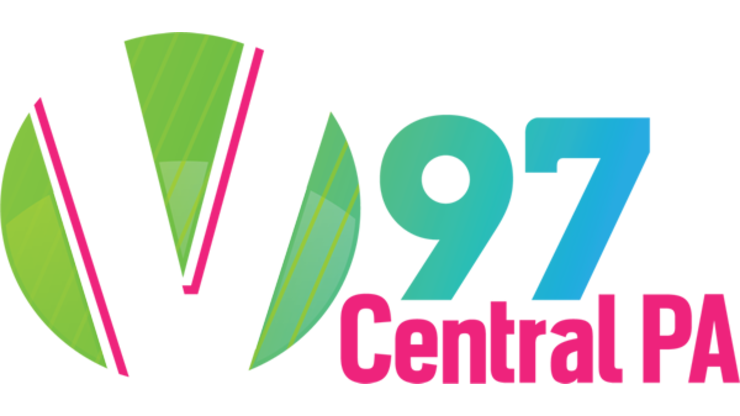
- Mount Carmel, Pennsylvania; United States
- Broadcast area: Bloomsburg–Berwick metropolitan area
- Frequency: 99.7 MHz
- Branding: V97

Programming
- Language: English
- Format: Contemporary hit radio
- Affiliations: iHeartRadio; Premiere Networks

Ownership
- Owner: iHeartMedia; (iHM Licenses, LLC)
- Sister stations: WBLJ-FM; WBYL; WKSB; WRAK; WRKK; WVRT

History
- First air date: 1991
- Former call signs: WXMH (1991–1993); WSPI (1993–2005)
- Call sign meaning: Variety (previous branding)

Technical information
- Licensing authority: FCC
- Facility ID: 25751
- Class: A
- ERP: 790 watts
- HAAT: 197 meters (646 ft)

Links
- Public license information: Public file; LMS
- Webcast: Listen live (via iHeartRadio)
- Website: v97fm.com

WVRZ (99.7 MHz) is a commercial FM radio station located in Mount Carmel, Pennsylvania. It is a simulcast of contemporary hit radio formatted WVRT (V97). WVRZ is owned by iHeartMedia.
