= WBLJ-FM =

- Shamokin, Pennsylvania; United States
- Broadcast area: Sunbury, Selinsgrove, Lewisburg
- Frequency: 95.3 MHz
- Branding: Bill 95.3

Programming
- Format: Country

Ownership
- Owner: iHeartMedia, Inc.; (iHM Licenses, LLC)
- Sister stations: WBYL, WKSB, WRAK, WRKK, WVRT, WVRZ

History
- First air date: September 13, 1968
- Former call signs: WISL-FM (1968–1982, 1992–2001); WSPI (1982–1992)
- Call sign meaning: "Bill"

Technical information
- Licensing authority: FCC
- Facility ID: 47286
- Class: A
- ERP: 1,250 watts
- HAAT: 154.0 meters (505.2 ft)
- Transmitter coordinates: 40°45′36.00″N 76°32′19.00″W

Links
- Public license information: Public file; LMS
- Webcast: Listen Live
- Website: bill95.iheart.com

WBLJ-FM (95.3 FM) is a radio station broadcasting a country music format licensed to Shamokin, Pennsylvania, United States. The station is owned by iHeartMedia.

== History ==
This station began broadcasting on September 13, 1968, as WISL-FM, the FM sister station to WISL (1480 AM). It was owned by Radio Anthracite Company until 1982, when it was acquired by the Shamokin Broadcasting Company, which also owned WMIM in Mount Carmel. It changed its call sign to WSPI on January 27, 1982, and began airing an adult contemporary format. WSPI and WMIM were sold to Harold Fulmer of Allentown in 1988.

WSPI was separated from WMIM when it was sold to an investor group led by Jim O'Leary, then-owner of WISL, in 1992. It became WISL-FM after the sale. O'Leary and Jean Sherman sold the WISL stations in 1997 to MJR Media of Shamokin, at which time the FM aired a classic rock format.

Clear Channel Communications, forerunner to iHeartMedia, acquired the WISL stations from MJR Media in 2001. By that time, WISL-FM aired an oldies format. Upon taking control in December 2001, the station flipped to a country format known as Bill FM, simulcasting WBYL (95.5 FM), and became WBLJ-FM. The Bill simulcast between Shamokin and Williamsport lasted until August 2025, when WBYL flipped to rock.
