= V97 =

V97 may refer to:

- Vought V-97, an American biplane
- WVRT, a radio station in Mill Hall, Pennsylvania
- V97, a 1997 V Festival music festival
