= WRAK (AM) =

- Williamsport, Pennsylvania; United States
- Frequency: 1400 kHz
- Branding: NewsRadio 1400 WRAK

Programming
- Format: News/Talk
- Affiliations: Fox News Radio; Compass Media Networks; Premiere Networks; Philadelphia Phillies Radio Network; Buffalo Bills Radio Network

Ownership
- Owner: iHeartMedia, Inc.; (iHM Licenses, LLC)
- Sister stations: WRKK, WBYL, WBLJ-FM, WKSB, WVRT, WVRZ

History
- First air date: 1923

Technical information
- Licensing authority: FCC
- Facility ID: 15325
- Class: C
- Power: 1,000 watts (unlimited)
- Transmitter coordinates: 41°14′22″N 77°02′27″W

Links
- Public license information: Public file; LMS
- Webcast: Listen Live
- Website: wrak.com

WRAK (1400 kHz) is an AM radio station licensed to serve Williamsport, Pennsylvania. The station is owned by iHeartMedia, Inc. and licensed to iHM Licenses, LLC. It airs a News/Talk format as "The News/Talk Network".

== History ==
The station was first licensed to the Economy Light Company in Escanaba, Michigan on March 23, 1923. The WRAK call sign was randomly assigned from a sequential roster of available call letters. The station was deleted on June 23, 1923, relicensed on February 14, 1925, deleted a second time on January 5, 1926, then reauthorized on February 9, 1926.

Following the establishment of the Federal Radio Commission (FRC), stations were initially issued a series of temporary authorizations starting on May 3, 1927. In addition, they were notified that if they wanted to continue operating, they needed to file a formal license application by January 15, 1928, as the first step in determining whether they met the new "public interest, convenience, or necessity" standard. On May 25, 1928, the FRC issued General Order 32, which notified 164 stations, including WRAK, that "From an examination of your application for future license it does not find that public interest, convenience, or necessity would be served by granting it." However, the station successfully convinced the commission that it should remain licensed. WRAK satisfied the FRC's concerns by selling the station to C. R. Cummins, who relocated the station to Erie, Pennsylvania.

On November 11, 1928, the FRC implemented a major reallocation of station transmitting frequencies, as part of a reorganization resulting from its General Order 40. WRAK was assigned to 1370 kHz. In March 1941, with the implementation of the North American Regional Broadcasting Agreement, most stations on 1370 kHz, including WRAK, were moved to 1400 kHz. WRAK relocated to Williamsport no later than 1951, the year WJET assumed WRAK's former frequency in Erie.

former logo
