= WVRT =

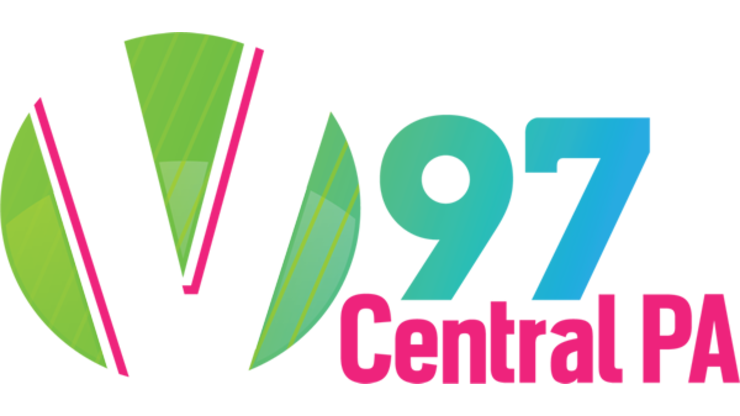
- Mill Hall, Pennsylvania; United States
- Broadcast area: Williamsport; State College
- Frequency: 97.7 MHz
- Branding: V97

Programming
- Format: Top 40 (CHR)
- Affiliations: Premiere Networks

Ownership
- Owner: iHeartMedia; (iHM Licenses, LLC)
- Sister stations: WBLJ-FM; WBYL; WKSB; WRAK; WRKK; WVRZ

History
- First air date: 1987
- Former call signs: WYRS (1987–1990); WRKK (1990–1992); WWWD (1992–1995)
- Call sign meaning: "Variety" (previous branding)

Technical information
- Licensing authority: FCC
- Facility ID: 58313
- Class: A
- ERP: 6,000 watts
- HAAT: 225 meters (738 ft)
- Transmitter coordinates: 41°13′14.3″N 77°16′37.9″W

Links
- Public license information: Public file; LMS
- Webcast: Listen live (via iHeartRadio)
- Website: v97fm.iheart.com

WVRT (97.7 FM, "V97") is an American radio station licensed to Mill Hall, Pennsylvania, with an output power of 6,000 watts. The station is owned by iHeartMedia and plays Top 40 (CHR) music. WVRT is simulcast on co-owned WVRZ (99.7) in Mount Carmel.
