= WZNG =

- Shelbyville, Tennessee; United States
- Frequency: 1400 kHz
- Branding: The Zinger 100.9

Programming
- Format: Classic rock
- Affiliations: Premiere Networks; Titans Radio Network

Ownership
- Owner: David Hopkins, Lori Schuler, and Paul Hopkins; (Hopkins Farms Broadcasting, Inc.)
- Sister stations: WLIJ

History
- First air date: 1947
- Former call signs: WHAL (1947–1997)
- Call sign meaning: "Zinger"

Technical information
- Licensing authority: FCC
- Facility ID: 37023
- Class: C
- Power: 1,000 watts unlimited
- Transmitter coordinates: 35°28′26.26″N 86°26′44.98″W
- Translator: 100.9 W265EE (Shelbyville)

Links
- Public license information: Public file; LMS
- Webcast: Listen live
- Website: wzngradio.com

WZNG (1400 AM "The Zinger 100.9") is a radio station broadcasting a classic rock format. Licensed to Shelbyville, Tennessee, United States, the station is owned by David Hopkins, Lori Schuler, and Paul Hopkins, through licensee Hopkins Farms Broadcasting, Inc.

The station was first licensed January 30, 1947, as WHAL.

== Translator ==
| Call sign | Frequency | City of license | FID | ERP (W) | Class | Transmitter coordinates | FCC info |
|---|---|---|---|---|---|---|---|
| W265EE | 100.9 FM | Shelbyville, Tennessee | 201689 | 250 | D | 35°37′14.4″N 86°25′35″W | LMS |
