= WXRS (AM) =

- Swainsboro, Georgia; United States
- Frequency: 1590 kHz
- Branding: The Rocket 93.5 & 97.1

Programming
- Format: Classic hits
- Affiliations: Premiere Networks; United Stations Radio Networks

Ownership
- Owner: Radiojones, LLC
- Sister stations: WEDB, WJAT, WXRS-FM

History
- First air date: 1978
- Former call signs: WXRS (1978–2006); WRJS (2006–2009)

Technical information
- Licensing authority: FCC
- Facility ID: 36203
- Class: D
- Power: 2,500 watts day 23 watts night
- Transmitter coordinates: 32°33′13.30″N 82°20′32.20″W
- Translators: 93.5 W228EB (Swainsboro); 97.1 W246BQ (Swainsboro)

Links
- Public license information: Public file; LMS
- Webcast: Listen Live

WXRS (1590 kHz) is an AM radio station broadcasting a classic hits format. Licensed to Swainsboro, Georgia, United States, the station is currently owned by Radiojones, LLC and features programming from Premiere Networks and United Stations Radio Networks.
