= WEBJ =

- Brewton, Alabama; United States
- Frequency: 1240 kHz
- Branding: WEBJ 1240AM

Programming
- Format: News/Talk
- Affiliations: Salem Radio network

Ownership
- Owner: Brewton Broadcasting, Inc.

History
- First air date: August 1, 1947

Technical information
- Licensing authority: FCC
- Facility ID: 19823
- Class: C
- Power: 1,000 watts
- Transmitter coordinates: 31°06′35″N 87°03′36″W

Links
- Public license information: Public file; LMS

WEBJ (1240 AM) is the oldest radio station in Brewton, Alabama, United States, going on air in 1947. The station serves the Brewton area with a news/talk format. The station broadcasts at 1000 watts and the transmitter is located near downtown Brewton.

== Programming ==
The format of the radio station was changed from oldies music to a news/talk format in 2003. The station's slogan is now "All talk, All the time."

August 1, 2012, marked WEBJ's 65th anniversary of signing on air.

== History ==
WEBJ began broadcasting Aug. 1, 1947, on 1240 kHz with 250 W power. The station was owned by William E. Brooks, with studios in the Lovelace Hotel in Brewton.
