= WLJA-FM =

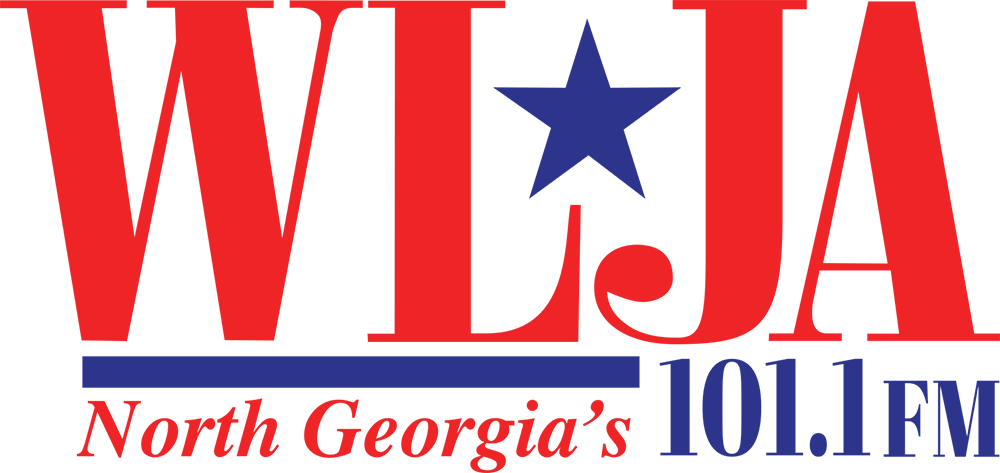
- Ellijay, Georgia; United States
- Frequency: 101.1 MHz
- Branding: 101.1 the Pulse

Programming
- Format: Christian country
- Affiliations: Atlanta Braves, University of Georgia

Ownership
- Owner: Carriage Radio; (Carriage Radio, LLC.)
- Sister stations: WPGY

History
- First air date: 1985 (at 93.5)
- Former call signs: WLJA (1984–1986)
- Former frequencies: 93.5 MHz (1985–2008)

Technical information
- Licensing authority: FCC
- Facility ID: 36892
- Class: C3
- ERP: 21,500 watts
- HAAT: 110 m (361 ft)
- Transmitter coordinates: 34°34′51.3″N 84°31′17.7″W

Links
- Public license information: Public file; LMS
- Webcast: Listen live
- Website: wljaradio.com

WLJA-FM (101.1 FM) is a radio station broadcasting a Christian country music format. Licensed to Ellijay, Georgia, the station is currently owned by Carriage Radio, LLC.

== History ==
The station went on the air as WLJA on 93.5 FM on November 20, 1984. On May 14, 1986, the station changed its call sign to the current WLJA-FM.

WLJA moved from 93.5 FM to its present frequency of 101.1 FM on May 5, 2008.

On March 10, 2025, WLJA-FM changed their format from classic country/southern gospel to Christian Country, branded as "101.1 The Pulse".
