= WBYL =

- Salladasburg, Pennsylvania; United States
- Broadcast area: Williamsport, Pennsylvania
- Frequency: 95.5 MHz
- Branding: Rock 95.5

Programming
- Format: Active rock
- Affiliations: Premiere Networks

Ownership
- Owner: iHeartMedia, Inc.; (iHM Licenses, LLC)
- Sister stations: WBLJ-FM, WKSB, WRAK, WVRT, WVRZ

History
- First air date: 1983
- Former call signs: WKHL-FM (1990–1992); WMRE-FM (1992–1995); WRAK-FM (1995–1996); WMYL (1996–2000)
- Call sign meaning: BYL sounds like "Bill" (previous format)

Technical information
- Licensing authority: FCC
- Facility ID: 49267
- Class: A
- ERP: 3,900 watts
- HAAT: 73 meters (240 ft)
- Transmitter coordinates: 41°13′59″N 77°12′07″W

Links
- Public license information: Public file; LMS
- Webcast: Listen live (via iHeartRadio)
- Website: rock955williamsport.iheart.com

WBYL (95.5 FM) is an active rock formatted radio station licensed to Salladasburg, Pennsylvania, United States, commonly known as "Rock 95.5". The station is owned by iHeartMedia, Inc.

former logo

Notable previous on air personalities included The Bill Breakfast Show with Ted Bennet, Tom Turner, Lou Kolb, and Lia.

On August 4, 2025, WBYL changed their format from country to active rock, branded as "Rock 95.5" (format moved from WRKK 1200 AM Hughesville, which went silent due to loss of transmitter site).
