= WLIJ =

- Shelbyville, Tennessee; United States
- Frequency: 1580 kHz

Programming
- Format: Classic country

Ownership
- Owner: David Hopkins, Lori Schuler, and Paul Hopkins; (Hopkins Farms Broadcasting Inc.)
- Sister stations: WZNG

Technical information
- Licensing authority: FCC
- Facility ID: 27632
- Class: D
- Power: 5,000 watts day 12 watts night
- Transmitter coordinates: 35°27′19.00″N 86°27′7.00″W
- Translator: 98.7 W254DW (Shelbyville)

Links
- Public license information: Public file; LMS
- Webcast: Listen Live
- Website: wlijradio.com

WLIJ (1580 AM) is a radio station broadcasting a classic country format, licensed to Shelbyville, Tennessee.

It was one of three radio stations owned by Arthur Wilkerson of Lenoir City, Tennessee. WLIJ was one of the few AM stations to use the Motorola C-QUAM AM Stereo system.

== Programming ==
WLIJ's programming includes "The Old-Time Country Radio Show" with Ken Fly and Paul Jones, which started with Jones and Pete Crim on WEKR in Fayetteville, Tennessee in 1998 and moved to WLIJ, still broadcast live from the BBQ Caboose Cafe in Lynchburg, Tennessee at 10 A.M. on Saturdays.

Paul and Nadine Hopkins bought WLIJ and WZNG, and Paul began a Bluegrass program which aired on WLIJ. Paul and J. Gregory Heinike began "J. Gregory Jamboree," a live two-hour program broadcast from J. Gregory's restaurant in Bell Buckle, Tennessee.
