= WOPP =

- Opp, Alabama; United States
- Frequency: 1290 kHz

Programming
- Format: Country; oldies; southern gospel

Ownership
- Owner: E & R Broadcasting, Inc.

History
- First air date: September 19, 1980
- Call sign meaning: Opp

Technical information
- Licensing authority: FCC
- Facility ID: 17829
- Class: B
- Power: 2,500 watts (day); 500 watts (night)
- Transmitter coordinates: 31°17′27.6″N 86°13′50.8″W

Links
- Public license information: Public file; LMS
- Webcast: Listen live
- Website: wopp.com

WOPP (1290 AM) is an American radio station licensed to Opp, Alabama, United States. The station is owned by E & R Broadcasting, Inc. It airs a variety format with a mix of country music and oldies during the week and southern gospel music on Sundays.

== History ==
This station's original owner, Opp Radio, Inc., received a construction permit for a new AM station broadcasting at 1290 kHz from the Federal Communications Commission (FCC) on June 12, 1979. The new station was assigned the call letters WOPP by the FCC on August 13, 1979. WOPP received its license to cover from the FCC on August 6, 1981.

In June 1983, Opp Radio, Inc., fell into financial difficulties and WOPP's broadcast license was involuntarily transferred to Opp Radio, Inc., Debtor-In-Possession. The transfer was approved by the FCC on June 17, 1983, and the transaction was consummated on July 14, 1983. In August 1986, having resolved its financial obligations, Opp Radio, Inc., Debtor-In-Possession, applied to the FCC to transfer the broadcast license back to Opp Radio, Inc. This transfer was approved by the FCC on August 21, 1986, and the transaction was consummated on the same day.

Opp Radio, Inc., reached an agreement in August 1987 to sell WOPP to E & R Broadcasting, Inc. The deal was approved by the FCC on September 21, 1987, and the transaction was consummated on the same day.
