= WKCJ =

Radio station in White Sulphur Springs, West Virginia

- White Sulphur Springs, West Virginia; United States
- Broadcast area: Lewisburg, West Virginia; Union, West Virginia; Covington, Virginia
- Frequency: 93.3 MHz
- Branding: Oldies 93

Programming
- Format: Classic hits, oldies
- Affiliations: Fox News Radio

Ownership
- Owner: Radio Greenbrier, LLC.
- Sister stations: WRLB; WRON-FM; WSLW

History
- First air date: December 2015
- Former call signs: WKCJ (2013–2015); WVIC (2015–2016)

Technical information
- Licensing authority: FCC
- Facility ID: 190380
- Class: A
- ERP: 1,100 watts
- HAAT: 236 meters (774 ft)
- Transmitter coordinates: 37°48′17.4″N 80°21′2.3″W

Links
- Public license information: Public file; LMS
- Website: radiogreenbrier.com

WKCJ (93.3 FM) is a classic hits and oldies formatted broadcast radio station licensed to White Sulphur Springs, West Virginia, serving Lewisburg and Union in West Virginia and Covington in Virginia. WKCJ is owned and operated by Radio Greenbrier, LLC.
