= WHPY (AM) =

- Clayton, North Carolina; United States
- Broadcast area: Raleigh-Durham
- Frequency: 1590 kHz

Programming
- Format: Christian radio
- Affiliations: Fundamental Broadcasting Network; Salem Radio Network

Ownership
- Owner: Fellowship Christian Academy; (Fellowship Baptist Church Inc)

History
- First air date: 1974; 52 years ago
- Call sign meaning: The Happy Station

Technical information
- Licensing authority: FCC
- Facility ID: 30615
- Class: D
- Power: 5,000 watts days 25 watts nights
- Transmitter coordinates: 35°38′49.00″N 78°30′21.00″W

Links
- Public license information: Public file; LMS
- Website: whpyradio.com

WHPY (1590 kHz) is an AM radio station in Clayton, North Carolina, serving the Raleigh-Durham area. It calls itself "Fellowship Christian Radio" and is owned by the Fellowship Baptist Church. It airs mostly Christian radio programming and is affiliated with the Fundamental Broadcasting Network.

By day, WHPY is powered at 5,000 watts. But to avoid interference to other stations that broadcast on 1590 AM, the station greatly reduces power at night to 25 watts. It uses a directional antenna with a two-tower array at all times.

== History ==
The station signed on the air in 1974. From the 1970s to the mid-1990s, it spent time as both a Top 40 station and a country music station. It originally was a daytimer station, required to go off the air at night. In the early 1970s, the transmitter site and the studio were located in rural Johnston County on the edge a large tobacco field.

During the years when the format was Top 40, some of the on-air personalities were Kathy Seadore, Chip Plyler, Mike Edwards, Jim Harrison, Bill Austin and Larry Denning. WHPY used the term "Happy Radio" and provided significant community support through the broadcast of local high school football and basketball games. In the mid-90s, it briefly went dark while it was being sold.

The Fellowship Baptist Church purchased the station in 1995. Upon taking control, the church changed WHPY to a Christian radio format.
