= KBJT =

- Fordyce, Arkansas; United States
- Broadcast area: South Central Arkansas
- Frequency: 1590 kHz
- Branding: Talk Radio 1590

Programming
- Format: News/Talk

Ownership
- Owner: KBJT, Inc.
- Sister stations: KQEW

History
- First air date: August 1, 1959

Technical information
- Licensing authority: FCC
- Facility ID: 33663
- Class: D
- Power: 4,700 watts (day); 35 watts (night)
- Transmitter coordinates: 33°48′10″N 92°26′10″W
- Translators: K255DI (98.9 MHz, Fordyce)

Links
- Public license information: Public file; LMS
- Website: kbjtkq.com

KBJT (1590 AM, "Talk Radio 1590") is a radio station licensed to serve Fordyce, Arkansas, United States. The station, established in 1959, is currently owned by KBJT, Inc.

== Programming ==
KBJT broadcasts a news/talk radio format featuring a mix of local news, community affairs, and syndicated talk shows. Local programming includes regional and state news, weather, local government meetings, and a tradio show called "Swap Shop". Syndicated programming includes talk shows hosted by Laura Ingraham, Jerry Doyle, Greg Knapp, G. Gordon Liddy, Dave Ramsey, and Michael Reagan.

== History ==
This station began regular broadcast operations on August 1, 1959, with 250 watts of power on a frequency of 1570 kHz. The station was launched under the ownership of KBJT, Inc., with Kermit F. Tracy serving as president, general manager, and chief engineer. The station was assigned the KBJT call sign by the Federal Communications Commission.

Mack R. Smith acquired license-holder KBJT, Inc., on January 3, 1962. Smith would run KBJT for 15 years before selling the company to a group led by Gary Coates and his brother Paul Coates in a transaction consummated on March 15, 1977. By 1980, Gary Coates had full control of KBJT, Inc., and he has served as the station's general manager since 1977.

In January 1984, the station applied to the FCC for a power increase in its daytime signal to 1,000 watts. The FCC granted KBJT this authorization on August 3, 1984.

Nearly 20 years later, in June 2004, the FCC authorized a change in frequency from 1570 to 1590 kHz, an increase in daytime power to 4,700 watts, and the addition of a nighttime signal at 35 watts. The FCC issued a new license to cover these changes on July 2, 2007.

== Notable alumni ==
- Sam Conn, a former intern, is now an actor and award-winning journalist.
