= WPJS =

- Conway, South Carolina; United States
- Broadcast area: Myrtle Beach/Grand Strand
- Frequency: 1330 kHz

Programming
- Language: English
- Format: Urban gospel

Ownership
- Owner: WPJS Broadcasting, Inc.

History
- First air date: 1945
- Last air date: July 2025
- Former call signs: WLAT (1945–1988); WLIT (1988–1990); WBIG (1990-1991)

Technical information
- Facility ID: 4436
- Class: D
- Power: 3,200 watts daytime; 23 watts nighttime
- Transmitter coordinates: 33°51′13.6″N 79°1′13.1″W

WPJS (1330 AM) was an urban gospel formatted radio station licensed to serve Conway, South Carolina, which targeted a primarily African-American audience and also aired community-oriented programming. The station operated from 1945 to 2025.

== History ==
WLAT was the first radio station in Horry County, South Carolina, first licensed on September 24, 1945. At first, WLAT transmitted on 1490 kHz with a 250-watt signal. In 1956, WLAT moved from 1490 to 1330 kHz, along with a daytime power increase to 1,000 watts, but giving up night authorization. The station applied for another power increase in 1958 to 5,000 watts, and would seek 500 watts at night in 1961. A sister FM station was added circa 1964. Formats for the AM station over the years included beautiful music and, as of 1985, country music.

In 1988, the new owners of WLAT, which by this time was separate from the FM, changed the format to urban contemporary and called it "Hot 1330". The owners had changed the callsign of a station in Charlotte, North Carolina, from WLIT, and just in case they wanted to use the letters again, they gave the letters to WLAT. The same thing was done when the station's owners changed the callsign WBIG on a station in Greensboro, North Carolina. The change to WBIG happened in 1989 and was accompanied by "The hot 1330 is the BIG difference on your AM". The station took the callsign WPJS on May 31, 1991.

An urban gospel format was chosen in the early 1990s. The old studios on U.S. Route 501 stood empty until being demolished, and the WLAT call letters still stood next to the road.

WPJS closed down in July 2025 following financial problems. The Federal Communications Commission cancelled the station's license on July 30, 2026, at WPJS Broadcasting's request.
