= KDAV =

Lubbock, Texas; United States
- Frequency: 1590 kHz
- Branding: La Caliente 1590

Programming
- Format: Silent

Ownership
- Owner: Monte Spearman and Gentry Todd Spearman; (High Plains Radio Network, LLC)

History
- First air date: 1998; 28 years ago
- Former call signs: KCBD (1947–1971); KEND (1971–1988); KLLL (1988–1998)

Technical information
- Licensing authority: FCC
- Facility ID: 36953
- Class: B
- Power: 1,000 watts
- Transmitter coordinates: 33°31′15″N 101°46′27″W

Links
- Public license information: Public file; LMS
- Website: www.hpr.network/texas

KDAV (1590 kHz edition) was an American radio station licensed to serve the community of Lubbock, Texas. The KDAV 1590 KHZ edition broadcast license was held by Monte and Gentry Todd Spearman through licensee High Plains Radio Network, LLC.

From August 18, 1998, to March 30, 2015, KDAV 1590 broadcast an oldies format which focused on 1950s and early 1960s popular, rockabilly, mild doo-wop, and country oldies.

The ownership and format of KDAV changed at 11 a.m. on March 30, 2015, as the station became part of the High Plains Radio Network.

== History ==
A three-tower transmitter site was installed in southeast Lubbock along the old Slaton Highway. Power was 1,000 watts, day and night, with each mode using a three-tower directional antenna system.

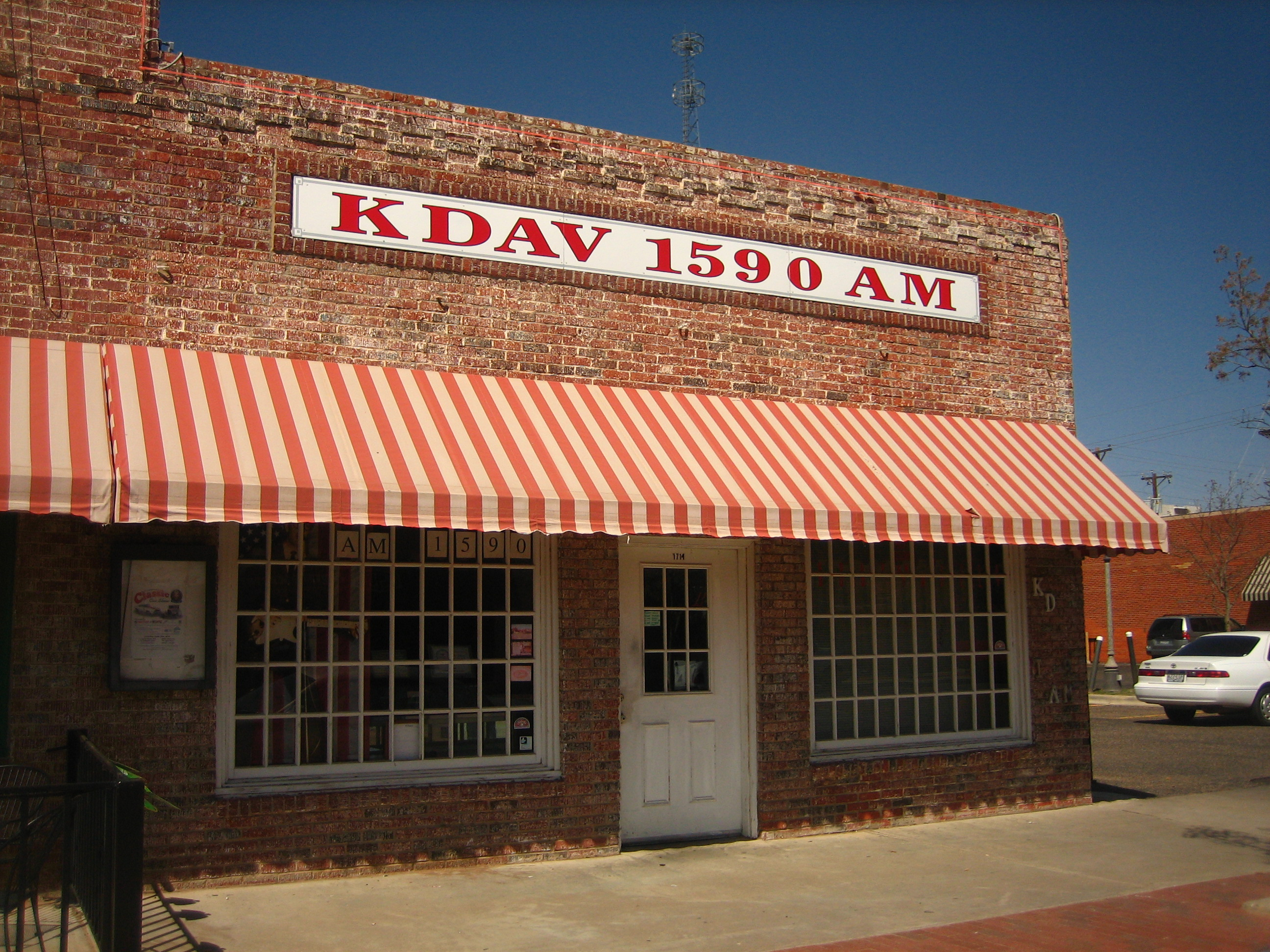
KDAV was called the "Buddy Holly Station".

The studios used to be at 1803–1805 Broadway between downtown Lubbock and Texas Tech University, but were relocated in 1953 when consolidated into the new KCBD-TV facilities at 5600 Avenue A. In 1971, KCBD radio was spun off to Lew Dee and 20 local businessmen. Call letters changed to KEND. The format had been adult middle of the road. Lew Dee changed the format to a more contemporary "The Living End" as KEND (The End of the Dial).

The station was sold to the Ackers, an Abilene, family, who owned KENM in Portales and Clovis, New Mexico, and were part owners, as well, of KRBC AM and KRBC-TV in Abilene. The format changed in 1975 to the NBC News and Information Service. In 1977, the station went country.

Terry Wynn acquired KEND in 1982. In 1988, KEND changed to KLLL. After a few more years, KLLL was sold to a local operator.

Later the station became KDAV and changed its format to oldies and later to talk. On August 1, 2016, KDAV changed its format from talk to contemporary Christian, branded as "The Spirit".

As of March 2024, KDAV is silent. No filings have been made to the FCC, and Radio-Locator.com still lists the station as "on-the-air", although no AM carrier is active on 1590 in the Lubbock metro.
