= WLBN =

- Lebanon, Kentucky; United States
- Frequency: 1590 kHz
- Branding: Cool Hits

Programming
- Format: Oldies
- Affiliations: Westwood One

Ownership
- Owner: Carolyn Lundy and Dave Colvin; (Simply Cool Radio, LLC)
- Sister stations: WLSK

History
- First air date: November 18, 1953
- Call sign meaning: Lebanon

Technical information
- Licensing authority: FCC
- Facility ID: 36883
- Class: D
- Power: 1,000 watts (day); 24 watts (night)
- Transmitter coordinates: 37°35′55″N 85°14′47″W
- Translator: 106.5 W293DG (Lebanon)

Links
- Public license information: Public file; LMS
- Website: wlbnradio.net

WLBN (1590 AM) is a commercial radio station currently broadcasting an oldies format. The station is licensed to broadcast in Lebanon, Kentucky, United States, and is owned by Carolyn Lundy and Dave Colvin, through licensee Simply Cool Radio, LLC. It features programming from Westwood One.

Former logo
