= WONG =

- Canton, Mississippi; United States
- Frequency: 1150 kHz
- Branding: Soul 1150

Programming
- Format: Urban AC; gospel music

Ownership
- Owner: Marion R. Williams

History
- First air date: April 1989
- Last air date: April 2026
- Call sign meaning: Working On New Ground

Technical information
- Licensing authority: FCC
- Facility ID: 31587
- Class: D
- Power: 500 watts (day); 19 watts (night)
- Transmitter coordinates: 32°32′35.5″N 90°3′36.3″W
- Translator: 105.5 W288DU (Canton)

Links
- Public license information: Public file; LMS

WONG (1150 AM) was a radio station licensed to serve Canton, Mississippi. The station was owned by Marion R. Williams. It aired an urban AC and gospel music format.

The station was assigned these call letters by the Federal Communications Commission (FCC) on April 1, 1986. It signed on in April 1989.

In April 2026, Marion Williams returned the WONG license to the FCC; it was cancelled on April 8, 2026.
