= WVZN =

- Columbia, Pennsylvania; United States
- Broadcast area: Lancaster, Pennsylvania
- Frequency: 1580 kHz
- Branding: Radio Vision Cristiana 1580

Programming
- Format: Silent: was Spanish Christian radio

Ownership
- Owner: Radio Vision Cristiana Management

History
- First air date: 1946
- Call sign meaning: "Vision"

Technical information
- Licensing authority: FCC
- Facility ID: 25819
- Class: D
- Power: 500 watts (day); 5 watts (night)
- Transmitter coordinates: 40°1′31.35″N 76°28′29.87″W
- Translator: See § Translator

Links
- Public license information: Public file; LMS
- Website: www.radiovision.net

WVZN (1580 AM, "Vision 1580") was a non-commercial educational AM radio station licensed to serve Columbia, Pennsylvania. The station was owned by Radio Vision Cristiana Management and the station has aired a Spanish Christian radio format.

NB - Just across the Susquehanna River, cross WVZN (1580 Columbia) off your station lists. The station, most recently broadcasting in Spanish, went silent January 11 after the land where its tower was located was sold. Licensee "Esfuerzo de Union Cristiana" tells the FCC that WVZN won't be returning to the air, a sad end to a history that started back in 1957 when the 500-watt daytimer signed on as WCOY."

This was from 2007 courtesy of Scott Fybush. We can safely assume that the station WILL NOT resume broadcasting.

== Translator ==
The following translator is licensed to simulcast the programming of WVZN:

Call sign	Frequency	City of license	FID	ERP (W)	HAAT	Class	Transmitter coordinates	FCC info
W243DS	96.5 FM	Columbia, Pennsylvania	144165	50	144 m (472 ft)	D	40°2′54″N 76°27′21″W	LMS
