= WRNA =

Simulcast of WRKB
- China Grove, North Carolina; United States
- Frequency: 1140 kHz

Programming
- Format: Southern gospel
- Affiliations: Salem Radio Network

Ownership
- Owner: Carl L. Ford; (South Rowan Broadcasting Co)
- Sister stations: WRKB

History
- First air date: November 1980
- Call sign meaning: We're Rowan's Newest Alternative (former format)

Technical information
- Licensing authority: FCC
- Facility ID: 61153
- Class: D
- Power: 1,000 watts daytime 250 watts critical hours
- Transmitter coordinates: 35°34′20″N 80°35′21″W
- Translator: (93.7 MHz) W229DL (China Grove)

Links
- Public license information: Public file; LMS
- Website: www.fordbroadcasting.com/fbn.htm

WRNA (1140 kHz) is a commercial AM radio station broadcasting a Southern Gospel radio format. Licensed to China Grove, North Carolina, it serves Rowan and Cabarrus Counties. It is owned by South Rowan Broadcasting and is simulcast with co-owned WRKB in Kannapolis.

By day, WRNA is powered at 1,000 watts, using a directional antenna. As 1140 AM is a clear channel frequency reserved for Class A stations XEMR-AM in Monterrey, Mexico, and WRVA in Richmond, Virginia, WRNA must sign off at night to avoid interference. During critical hours, it is powered at 250 watts.

== History ==
The station signed on in November 1980.

Carl L. Ford's first job was at WRKB in Kannapolis, which was owned by Bill Hefner at the time. Ford and his wife, Angela, own Ford Broadcasting, which owns WRKB and WRNA. The two stations broadcast the same programming, and Ford hosts a morning show on both stations.
