= WRLB =

Coordinates: 37.958°N 80.762°W

- Rainelle, West Virginia; United States
- Broadcast area: Rainelle, West Virginia; Summersville, West Virginia; Lewisburg, West Virginia
- Frequency: 95.3 MHz
- Branding: Rock 95 WRLB

Programming
- Format: Active rock

Ownership
- Owner: Radio Greenbrier, LLC
- Sister stations: WKCJ; WRON-FM; WSLW

History
- First air date: 1977

Technical information
- Licensing authority: FCC
- Facility ID: 54410
- Class: B1
- ERP: 13,000 watts
- HAAT: 139 meters (456 ft)

Links
- Public license information: Public file; LMS
- Webcast: Listen live
- Website: radiogreenbrier.com

WRLB (95.3 FM) is an active rock formatted broadcast radio station licensed to Rainelle, West Virginia, serving the Rainelle/Summersville/Lewisburg area. WRLB is owned and operated by Radio Greenbrier, LLC
