= WISL (AM) =

Shamokin, Pennsylvania; United States
- Broadcast area: Harrisburg, Pennsylvania
- Frequency: 1480 kHz

Programming
- Format: Oldies

Ownership
- Owner: Basic Broadcasting; (Basic Licensing, Inc.)

History
- First air date: January 25, 1948
- Last air date: 2003
- Call sign meaning: Isobel S. Lark

Technical information
- Facility ID: 36706
- Power: 1,000 watts (day); 250 watts (night)

WISL (1480 AM) was an American radio station licensed to serve the community of Shamokin, Pennsylvania. At the time of the license expiration in 2006, the station was owned by Basic Broadcasting and the broadcast license was held by Basic Licensing, Inc., of Quakertown, Pennsylvania.

== Early days ==
The station was assigned the license by the Federal Communications Commission on July 7, 1947. WISL began regular broadcast operations in January 1948 with studios at Rock and Sunbury Streets in downtown Shamokin.

WISL was originally owned by Radio Anthracite, Inc., with Henry W. Lark serving as company president. The company name reflected the coal mining heritage of the Shamokin area. The call letters were for the owner's wife, Isobel S. Lark. This ownership would persist into the 1980s.

In September 1997, Laurel Broadcasting Company, Inc., reached an agreement to sell this station and its FM sister station to MJR Media, Inc., (Charles Michael Hagerty, president). The combo sold for a combined sale price of $400,000. The deal was approved by the FCC on November 19, 1997.

== 2000s ==
In August 2001, MJR Media, Inc., reached an agreement to sell the AM/FM station combo to Clear Channel Communications through its Clear Channel Broadcasting Licenses, Inc., subsidiary. The combined price for both stations was reported as $800,000. The deal was approved by the FCC on October 2, 2001. This ownership would prove short-lived as Clear Channel Communications, desiring to keep only WISL-FM (now WBLJ-FM), reached an agreement in August 2002 to sell WISL to Basic Broadcasting subsidiary Basic Licenses, Inc. The deal was approved by the FCC on September 16, 2002. At the time of the sale, WISL was playing an adult standards music format but when it resumed broadcasting in November 2002 it switched to a satellite-fed oldies music format. However, the station suffered from a series of financial and technical difficulties and ultimately fell silent for good in late 2003.

== Shutdown ==
After more than 50 years of broadcasting, WISL's final broadcast license expired on August 1, 2006. The call sign was deleted from the FCC database on May 19, 2008.

To honor WISL's history, an Internet radio station has been created at www.WISL1480.com including photographs of the early days in Shamokin.
