= KIRT =

Radio station in Mission, Texas (1957–2023)

- Mission, Texas; United States
- Broadcast area: Rio Grande Valley
- Frequency: 1580 kHz
- Branding: La Radical

Programming
- Format: Defunct (was Spanish Christian)

Ownership
- Owner: Iglesia del Pueblo; (Bravo Broadcasting Company, Inc.)

History
- First air date: 1957
- Last air date: November 21, 2023

Technical information
- Licensing authority: FCC
- Facility ID: 56474
- Class: B
- Power: 1,000 watts day; 302 watts night
- Transmitter coordinates: 26°17′34.8″N 98°19′51.6″W

Links
- Public license information: Public file; LMS

KIRT was a radio station at 1580 AM in Mission, Texas. It was owned by Bravo Broadcasting Company and carried a Spanish language Christian talk and teaching radio format known as "La Radical." Its license was revoked on November 21, 2023, for failure to pay regulatory fees.

== History ==
KIRT received its license in 1957 and by 1958 was broadcasting entirely in Spanish. Its initial owners, Robert F. Pool Sr. and Jr., sold the station to KIRT, Inc. in 1958; in 1970, KIRT was sold to Rio Broadcasting Company.

In 2001, Bravo Broadcasting Company was transferred from Edward L. Gómez to Iglesia del Pueblo.

On November 21, 2023, the Federal Communications Commission revoked KIRT's license for failure to pay delinquent regulatory fees. This came after a required response from the station did not occur. The total amount of money owed was $36,165.23 plus interest.
