= WABV =

- Abbeville, South Carolina; United States
- Broadcast area: Abbeville, South Carolina; Abbeville County, South Carolina
- Frequency: 1590 kHz

Programming
- Format: Classic hits/Oldies

Ownership
- Owner: John L. Wallace; (John Wallace Broadcasting, LLC)

History
- First air date: March 1956
- Call sign meaning: W ABbbeVille

Technical information
- Licensing authority: FCC
- Facility ID: 3152
- Class: D
- Power: 1,000 watts daytime; 27 watts nighttime
- Transmitter coordinates: 34°9′3.0″N 82°23′34.0″W

Links
- Public license information: Public file; LMS

WABV (1590 AM) is a broadcast licensed to Abbeville, South Carolina, serving Abbeville and Abbeville County, South Carolina. WABV is owned and operated by John L. Wallace, through licensee John Wallace Broadcasting, LLC.

== History ==
In 2007, WABV changed formats to country as “Cool Country 1590”. WABV’s country mix was classic and new. On March 5, 2021, WABV posted to its Facebook page that it had changed to a religious format as “Spirit Radio”.

== Sale to John Wallace Broadcasting, LLC ==
On April 18, 2022, R&M Broadcasting entered an agreement with John Wallace Broadcasting to sell WABV to the latter. WABV was still off the air when R&M Broadcasting sold the station to John Wallace Broadcasting. John Wallace Broadcasting filed for Special Temporary Authority to transmit with 500 watts as of May 2, 2023. On May 25, 2023, WABV went off the air for financial reasons. It explained in a letter to the FCC that if it could not return to the air within 30 days, that it would ask for special temporary authority to remain silent. The station was reported silent in June 2023. On June 22, 2023, a request for special temporary authority was submitted to the FCC to remain silent for financial reasons. WABV resumed broadcasting on April 18, 2024. WABV was sold to the Abbeville Broadcasting Company in July 2024 for $40,000.
