= WVOE =

Radio station in Chadbourn, North Carolina

WVOE-AM
- Chadbourn, North Carolina; United States
- Broadcast area: Wilmington, North Carolina
- Frequency: 1590 kHz
- Branding: WVOE 1590

Programming
- Format: Gospel music/Urban Adult Contemporary

Ownership
- Owner: Ebony Enterprises

History
- First air date: 1962

Technical information
- Licensing authority: FCC
- Class: D
- Power: 1000 watts daytime
- Transmitter coordinates: 34°21′05″N 78°50′38″W

Links
- Public license information: Public file; LMS

WVOE (1590 AM) is a radio station broadcasting a Gospel music and Urban Adult Contemporary format. Licensed to Chadbourn, North Carolina in the United States. The station is owned by Ebony Enterprises. WVOE first signed on in 1962 and is the oldest African American owned radio station in the South.

In 2019, the building and equipment were in bad shape and few people were listening to AM radio. The station was in danger of going off the air but turned to GoFundMe to keep it going.
