= WDJZ =

- South Daytona, Florida; United States
- Broadcast area: Daytona Beach metropolitan area
- Frequency: 1590 kHz
- Branding: 100.7 The Wave

Programming
- Format: Smooth jazz
- Affiliations: Compass Media Networks

Ownership
- Owner: Glenn Cherry

History
- First air date: February 19, 1957
- Former call signs: WDAT (1957–1959); WELE (1959–1981); WZIP (1981–1988); WPUL (1988–2022)
- Call sign meaning: "Daytona Jazz"

Technical information
- Licensing authority: FCC
- Facility ID: 53704
- Class: D
- Power: 1,000 watts day; 47 watts night
- Transmitter coordinates: 29°9′16″N 81°1′20″W
- Translator: 100.7 W264DP (Daytona Beach)

Links
- Public license information: Public file; LMS
- Webcast: Listen live
- Website: wdjzfm.com

WDJZ (1590 AM) is a commercial radio station licensed to South Daytona, Florida, and serving the Daytona Beach metropolitan area. It is owned by Glenn Cherry and it broadcasts a smooth jazz radio format.

WDJZ transmits with 1,000 watts by day, 47 watts at night, using a non-directional antenna. The transmitter is on Dr. Martin Luther King Jr. Boulevard in Daytona Beach. Programming is also heard on 220-watt FM translator W264DP at 100.7 MHz in Daytona Beach.

== History ==
The station signed on the air on February 19, 1957 under the call sign WDAT. It was a country-western station. Its callsign changed to WELE in 1959, and its format changed to an R&B music format in 1963 before going back to country by 1967. In 1981, the station took on new call letters WZIP and became an oldies station before returning to country in 1986.

In 1988, a group of investors who were graduates of the historically black Morehouse College bought WZIP. The callsign changed to WPUL and format changed to urban contemporary.

Until 2022, WPUL broadcast progressive talk radio shows including The Thom Hartmann Program and The Stephanie Miller Show as well as various African-American-oriented shows including Keepin' It Real with Al Sharpton and locally produced shows.

The station was silent beginning on February 17, 2014, as station owners sought a new broadcast tower site.

On September 16, 2022, the station changed its call sign to WDJZ, which stands for Daytona Jazz.
