= WPFD =

- Fairview, Tennessee; United States
- Frequency: 850 kHz
- Branding: La Mejor (The Major)

Programming
- Format: Regional Mexican

Ownership
- Owner: S V Communications Inc

History
- First air date: 1982
- Last air date: 2012
- Former call signs: WBLP (1982–1984)

Technical information
- Facility ID: 57044
- Class: D
- Power: 500 watts day
- Transmitter coordinates: 36°0′29″N 87°8′38″W

WPFD (850 AM, "La Mejor") was a daytime-only radio station broadcasting a Regional Mexican music format. Licensed to Fairview, Tennessee, the station was owned by S V Communications Inc.

The station's license was cancelled on August 27, 2012, and WPFD's facility record has been deleted from the U.S. Federal Communications Commission website.
