= WSTU =

- Stuart, Florida; United States
- Broadcast area: Treasure Coast
- Frequency: 1450 kHz
- Branding: True Oldies Channel

Programming
- Format: Oldies
- Affiliations: Fox News Radio; Jacksonville Jaguars

Ownership
- Owner: Little Dog Media Group LLC
- Sister stations: WDJA, WPSL

History
- First air date: December 1954
- Call sign meaning: Stuart, Florida

Technical information
- Facility ID: 74076
- Class: C
- Power: 1,000 watts
- Transmitter coordinates: 27°12′53″N 80°15′24″W
- Translator: 106.9 W295BJ (Jupiter)

Links
- Webcast: Listen Live
- Website: wstu1450.com

WSTU (1450 kHz) is a commercial AM radio station licensed to Stuart, Florida, and serving the Treasure Coast. It broadcasts a oldies format. The station is currently owned by Little Dog Media LLC.

WSTU broadcasts at 1,000 watts. It uses a non-directional antenna.

== Programming ==
WSTU has a local weekday morning show, "Get Up and Go with Evan and Bonnie and Fredo, Bentley, Big Kitty, and Those damn cats from Bonnie." The rest of the weekday schedule includes some brokered programming hours, with conservative talk from Fox News Radio, including Brian Kilmeade, Jimmy Failla and Guy Benson.

== History ==
WSTU signed on the air in December 1954. Les Combs was the original owner. In 1969 the station was sold to Harvey L Glascock, whose family owned the station until 1997 when it was sold to American Radio Systems. After a brief ownership by a Broward County businessman, it was sold to Barry Grant Marsh and David Pomerance. Marsh had been Operations Manager of WSTU for many years under the Glasscock family.

The station was purchased by Treasure Coast Broadcasters in 2001. When WSTU went on the air, Stuart went from the biggest city on Florida's east coast without its own radio station to the smallest city on Florida's east coast with its own radio station. WSTU had a strong local news commitment from the start, and continues that to this day under News Director Tom Teter, who has been with the station since 1980. Teter has won many awards for news excellence from UPI and AP including Best Newscast in Florida and Best Spot News Reporting. From the earliest days the Martin County community viewed the station as more of a public utility than a privately owned radio station.

WSTU was also one of the first radio stations in Florida to broadcast high school sports on a regular basis and continues to broadcast high school football, basketball and baseball. Hamp Elliot did the play-by-play for many years followed by Teter who handled the play-by-play for more than 20 years. Rick McGuire now does much of the play-by-play. This summary written by Tom Teter.

For a period of time, WSTU (1450) AM radio station program schedule included a Saturday Night Dancing 'Bongo' Party from 7 p.m. to 11:30 p.m., hosted by Walter Oden. On weekday afternoons in the 1960s, the station played the 'pop' tunes and encouraged teens to call in and request a song to be dedicated to a friend or 'sweetheart,' which was then announced and played on-air. This radio show is credited with easing the path to school integration in the late 1960s.
