= WRKB =

- Kannapolis, North Carolina; United States
- Frequency: 1460 kHz

Programming
- Format: Southern gospel
- Affiliations: Salem Radio Network

Ownership
- Owner: Carl Ford; (Ford Broadcasting, Inc.)
- Sister stations: WRNA

History
- First air date: December 1, 1960
- Call sign meaning: "Radio Kannapolis"

Technical information
- Licensing authority: FCC
- Facility ID: 22029
- Class: D
- Power: 2,000 watts daytime; 194 watts nighttime
- Transmitter coordinates: 35°29′14″N 80°36′18″W
- Translator: 99.3 W257EI (Kannapolis)

Links
- Public license information: Public file; LMS
- Website: fordbroadcasting.com

WRKB (1460 AM) is a radio station broadcasting a southern gospel format. Licensed to Kannapolis, North Carolina, United States, it serves the Rowan and Cabarrus county areas. The station is owned by Carl Ford's Ford Broadcasting.

== History ==
Carl L Ford's first job was at WRKB in Kannapolis, which was owned by Bill Hefner at the time. Now Ford and his wife Angela own Ford Broadcasting, which owns WRKB and WRNA. The two stations broadcast the same programming, and Ford hosts a morning show on both stations.
