= Official Detective (radio series) =

American radio police series (1947–1957)

Official Detective is an American police radio series that was broadcast on Mutual from January 19, 1947, through March 7, 1957.

== Premise ==
Detective Lieutenant Dan Britt and Sergeant Al Bowen investigated crimes such as arson, insurance scams, and murder in cases that were related "in cooperation with Official Detective Stories Magazine". Craig McDonnell portrayed Britt, and Tommy Evans played Bowen. Tom Hudson was the announcer.

On February 12, 1952, the program began presenting Official Detective Awards to people who had done something exemplary to fight crime. Lay people as well as people affiliated with police were eligible for the awards. The first recipients were two state troopers from Connecticut.

== Production ==
Wynn Wright was the producer and director. Sam Moss adapted stories from the magazine for the program. Other writers included William K. Welles Jr. and Mildred Henry Merrill. Chet Kingsbury was the musical director. The sponsor was Pharmaco Inc.

== Critical response ==
A review of the January 20, 1948, episode in the trade publication Billboard described the acting as "satisfactory, but hardly enough to pull the show together". The review cited "poor scripting and intruding commercials" as weaknesses of the episode, with a total of nine intrusions (ranging from brief plugs to full commercials) in the 25-minute episode. The plot fared little better in the review, which said that the culprit was disclosed midway through the episode, leaving "no suspense connected with the inevitable capture."

Allen Rich wrote in the Valley Times newspaper that the episode of Official Detective that he reviewed was "a far better show than many others of its type employing the most expensive stars and authors." He explained that the story "unfolded naturally" without unnecessary explanations or "stereotyped gimmicks" and that "best of all, the action throughout was crystal clear".

A review of the December 23, 1947, episode in the trade publication Variety called Official Detective "a fairly presentable dramatization of the sort of murder and crime cases featured by 'true' detective mags." The review described the show as "a run-of-the-mill production", with no features that might distinguish it from other detective shows. The show's best characteristics, according to the review, were the lack of gore and horror and the fact that criminals were held accountable for their crimes.
