= WRON-FM =

- Lewisburg, West Virginia; United States
- Broadcast area: Lewisburg, West Virginia; Ronceverte, West Virginia; Rainelle, West Virginia; Union, West Virginia
- Frequency: 103.1 MHz
- Branding: 103.1 The Bear

Programming
- Format: Country
- Affiliations: Fox News Radio; Performance Racing Network; West Virginia MetroNews; West Virginia Mountaineers

Ownership
- Owner: Radio Greenbrier, Inc.; (Michael J. Kidd)
- Sister stations: WKCJ; WRLB; WSLW

History
- First air date: 1981
- Former call signs: WKCJ (1981–2008)
- Call sign meaning: Ronceverte (previous community of license)

Technical information
- Licensing authority: FCC
- Facility ID: 59675
- Class: B1
- ERP: 3,300 watts
- HAAT: 273 meters (896 ft)
- Transmitter coordinates: 37°47′54.4″N 80°30′55.2″W

Links
- Public license information: Public file; LMS
- Webcast: Listen live
- Website: twovirginiasmedia.com/radio-greenbrier/the-bear-103-1/

WRON-FM (103.1 MHz) is a country formatted broadcast radio station licensed to Lewisburg, West Virginia, serving the Lewisburg/Ronceverte/Rainelle/Union area. WRON-FM is owned and operated by Radio Greenbrier, Inc.

== Station swap and sale ==
All Access reported on September 20, 2007, that Todd P. Robinson, Inc.'s WKCJ would be swapped to Radio Greenbrier, Inc. for WRON-FM. This took place on August 1, 2008. WKCJ (now at 97.7) applied to move south to Elliston-Lafayette, Virginia (which is between Roanoke and Christiansburg).

The swap ensured that when Todd P. Robinson, Inc. moves the 97.7 frequency, WRON-FM would continue to have an FM station serving Greenbrier County, West Virginia.

On Wednesday, July 13, 2011, Roanoke, Virginia–based Mel Wheeler, Inc. agreed to purchase the station for $675,000. A new application was filed to move the signal to Elliston-Lafayette, on Fort Lewis Mountain, broadcasting 260 watts, but from a height of 1,542 feet (470 m).

On December 2, 2011, Mel Wheeler, Inc. took ownership and control of WKCJ and began simulcasting Lynchburg based WVBE-FM. On December 9, 2011, the callsign was changed to WVBB.
