= WSOL (AM) =

Radio station in San Germán, Puerto Rico

- San Germán, Puerto Rico; Puerto Rico
- Broadcast area: Western Puerto Rico
- Frequency: 1090 kHz
- Branding: Radio Sol (Sun Radio)

Programming
- Format: Spanish Variety

Ownership
- Owner: Caribe Media; (WSOL Caribe Media, Inc.)

History
- First air date: November 25, 1961
- Former call signs: WRSG (1961-1980); WBOZ (1980-1985)
- Call sign meaning: Sol = Spanish for sun

Technical information
- Licensing authority: FCC
- Facility ID: 58832
- Class: B
- Power: 250 watts day 730 watts night

Links
- Public license information: Public file; LMS
- Website: www.radiosol1090am.com

WSOL (1090 AM) is a radio station broadcasting a Spanish Variety format. Licensed to San Germán, Puerto Rico, it serves the western Puerto Rico area. The station is currently owned by Caribe Media.
