= WPSL (AM) =

Coordinates: 27°18′28″N 80°18′26″W

- Port St. Lucie, Florida; United States
- Broadcast area: Treasure Coast
- Frequency: 1590 kHz

Programming
- Format: Talk radio
- Affiliations: Florida News Network, CBS News Radio

Ownership
- Owner: Port St Lucie Broadcasters
- Sister stations: WJNX, WSTU

History
- Call sign meaning: Port Saint Lucie

Technical information
- Licensing authority: FCC
- Facility ID: 53044
- Class: D
- Power: 5,000 watts day 63 watts night
- Transmitter coordinates: 27º18'28"N, 80º18'26"W

Links
- Public license information: Public file; LMS
- Website: wpsl.com

WPSL (1590 kHz) is a commercial AM radio station, licensed to Port St. Lucie, Florida, and serving the Treasure Coast. It is owned by Port St. Lucie Broadcasters and broadcasts a talk radio format.

By day, WPSL is powered at 5,000 watts. But to avoid interference with other stations on 1590 AM, it reduces power at night to 63 watts. It uses a non-directional antenna.

== History ==
WPSL's original construction permit was applied for on July 12, 1984. It acquired the call sign WPSL. It signed on the air on October 12, 1965.

It originally was a daytimer, broadcasting at 500 watts by day and going off the air at sunset.
