= WRRZ =

- Clinton, North Carolina; United States
- Frequency: 880 kHz
- Branding: Radio Nueva Vida

Programming
- Format: Spanish Christian Radio Nueva Vida

Ownership
- Owner: Educational Media Foundation; (Educational Media Foundation)

History
- First air date: 1947
- Call sign meaning: W RR (Double R) Z

Technical information
- Licensing authority: FCC
- Class: D
- Power: 1,000 watts day
- Translator: 102.5 W273CP (Clinton)

Links
- Public license information: Public file; LMS

WRRZ (880 AM) is a radio station broadcasting a Spanish Christian format. It is licensed to Clinton, North Carolina, United States. The station is owned by Educational Media Foundation WRRZ must power down at night due to WHSQ in New York City, a clear-channel station, operating on the same frequency.

== History ==
WRRZ signed on April 5, 1947.

In 1966, the station's tower was blown down by high winds that caused widespread damage in North Carolina.

For most of its history, the station played country music and Southern gospel. The station's 1000-watt signal covered 28 counties. The last day that WRRZ played a county music format was February 14, 2003.

After 25 years at the station, Dave Denton sold WRRZ to Victor and Martha Sanchez, who had bought time on the station since 1990, in a deal effective February 7, 2003. The station is no longer on the air.
