= WQCH =

- LaFayette, Georgia; United States
- Broadcast area: Chattanooga area
- Frequency: 1590 kHz
- Branding: Georgia 93.7 & AM 1590 WQCH

Programming
- Format: Country
- Affiliations: AP Radio

Ownership
- Owner: Radix Broadcasting, Inc.

History
- First air date: December 1954 (as WLFA)
- Former call signs: WLFA (1954–1988)
- Call sign meaning: "Queen City of the Highlands" a longtime nickname for LaFayette, Georgia

Technical information
- Licensing authority: FCC
- Facility ID: 54912
- Class: D
- Power: 5,000 watts day
- Transmitter coordinates: 34°42′57.00″N 85°16′6.00″W
- Translator: 93.7 W229CX (Lafayette)

Links
- Public license information: Public file; LMS
- Webcast: Listen Live
- Website: WQCH Online

WQCH (1590 AM) is a radio station broadcasting a country music format. It is licensed to LaFayette, Georgia, United States, and serves the Chattanooga area. The station is owned by Radix Broadcasting, Inc. and features programming from AP Radio.

From 1954 to 1988, WQCH operated with the call letters WLFA.

Former logo

== FM Translator ==
In addition to the main station at 1590 kHz, WQCH programming is relayed to an FM translator in order to provide 24 hour coverage. The AM frequency broadcasts during the daytime hours only (approximately sunrise to sunset). An FM signal also gives the listener high fidelity sound.

Broadcast translator for WQCH
Call sign	Frequency	City of license	FID	ERP (W)	Class	FCC info
W229CX	93.7 FM	Lafayette, Georgia	200344	250	D	LMS
