= WSLW =

Coordinates: 37°48′17.4″N 80°21′2.3″W

- White Sulphur Springs, West Virginia; United States
- Broadcast area: White Sulphur Springs, West Virginia; Lewisburg, West Virginia
- Frequency: 1310 kHz
- Branding: News Talk 97.3 WSLW

Programming
- Format: News/talk

Ownership
- Owner: Todd P. Robinson; (Radio Greenbrier, LLC)
- Sister stations: WKCJ; WRLB; WRON-FM

History
- First air date: 1971
- Call sign meaning: White Sulphur (Springs) Lewisburg West (Virginia)

Technical information
- Licensing authority: FCC
- Facility ID: 59678
- Class: D
- Power: 5,000 watts daytime only
- Translators: 97.3 W247BZ (Lewisburg); 97.9 W250CU (White Sulphur Springs)

Links
- Public license information: Public file; LMS
- Website: twovirginiasmedia.com/radio-greenbrier

WSLW (1310 AM) is a daytime-only broadcast radio station licensed to White Sulphur Springs, West Virginia, serving White Sulphur Springs and Lewisburg in West Virginia. WSLW is owned by Todd P. Robinson.

== Trivia ==
For a while, WSLW was licensed to the town of "White Sulphur Spring" in West Virginia, though there is no town by that spelling in West Virginia. The correct spelling of the town's name is White Sulphur Springs. This was finally corrected sometime in 2011.

== Translator ==
In addition to the main station at 1310 kilohertz, two FM translators are used to provide nighttime coverage, albeit with a much smaller coverage area than the main AM station;

Call sign	Frequency	City of license	FID	ERP (W)	HAAT	Class	FCC info
W247BZ	97.3 FM	Lewisburg, West Virginia	143004	250 vertical	242.5 m (796 ft)	D	LMS
W250CU	97.9 FM	White Sulphur Springs, West Virginia	203187	1	13 m (43 ft)	D	LMS
