= WNPZ =

- Knoxville, Tennessee; United States
- Broadcast area: Knoxville Metropolitan Area
- Frequency: 1580 kHz
- Branding: Power 1580

Programming
- Format: Urban Adult Contemporary/Gospel

Ownership
- Owner: Metropolitan Management Corporation of Tennessee

History
- First air date: May 21, 1961
- Former call signs: WSKT (1961–1987); WMRE (1987–1990); WDMF (1990–1998); WAHI (1998–2003); DWNPZ (2017–2019)

Technical information
- Licensing authority: FCC
- Facility ID: 11191
- Class: D
- Power: 5,000 watts day 1,000 watts critical hours
- Transmitter coordinates: 35°54′42″N 83°53′33″W

Links
- Public license information: Public file; LMS

WNPZ (1580 AM) is a radio station serving the Knoxville Metropolitan Area with an Urban Adult Contemporary/Gospel music format. The station is licensed to Metropolitan Management Corporation of Tennessee.

WNPZ's license was canceled on June 20, 2017, for not paying debts it owed to the Federal Communications Commission (FCC), which prevented the renewal of the station's license.

On July 24, 2017, WNPZ filed a Petition for Reconsideration. The station's license was reinstated by the FCC on June 6, 2019.
