= WDBL =

- Springfield, Tennessee; United States
- Frequency: 1590 kHz
- Branding: Springfield's News Talk

Programming
- Format: News Talk Information
- Affiliations: Citadel Media, Salem Radio Network

Ownership
- Owner: Eliu Maldonado; (Eben-ezer Broadcasting Corporation)
- Sister stations: WSGI

Technical information
- Licensing authority: FCC
- Facility ID: 15960
- Class: D
- Power: 710 watts day 30 watts night
- Transmitter coordinates: 36°29′42.00″N 86°54′22.00″W

Links
- Public license information: Public file; LMS
- Website: wsgi1100.com

WDBL (1590 AM, "Springfield's News Talk") is a radio station broadcasting a News Talk Information format. Licensed to Springfield, Tennessee, United States, the station is owned by Eliu Maldonado, through licensee Eben-ezer Broadcasting Corporation, and features programming from Citadel Media and Salem Radio Network.
