= WPSP =

Radio station in Royal Palm Beach, Florida

- Royal Palm Beach, Florida; United States
- Broadcast area: West Palm Beach, Florida
- Frequency: 1190 kHz
- Branding: La Primera 104.1 FM & 1190 AM

Programming
- Language: Spanish
- Format: Adult contemporary

Ownership
- Owner: George M. Arroyo; (Q-Broadcasting Corporation, Inc.)

History
- First air date: September 1, 1989; 37 years ago
- Former call signs: WOEZ (1989–1995); WLAZ (1995–1995)

Technical information
- Licensing authority: FCC
- Facility ID: 23822
- Class: B
- Power: 690 watts (day); 410 watts (night)
- Transmitter coordinates: 26°49′1″N 80°15′7″W
- Translator: 104.1 W281CJ (West Palm Beach)

Links
- Public license information: Public file; LMS
- Webcast: Listen live
- Website: laprimerawpb.com

WPSP (1190 AM & 104.1 FM, "La Primera") is an American commercial radio station in Royal Palm Beach, Florida. Owned by George M. Arroyo, It airs a Spanish-language adult contemporary radio format, the station serves the West Palm Beach radio market, The transmitter site is off Northlake Blvd in West Palm Beach.

== History ==
The station went on the air as WOEZ on September 1, 1989. On March 10, 1995, the station changed its call sign to WLAZ, and on December 8, 1995, to the current WPSP.
