= WSGI (AM) =

- Springfield, Tennessee; United States
- Frequency: 1100 kHz

Programming
- Format: Christian radio

Ownership
- Owner: Eliu Maldonado; (Eben-ezer Broadcasting Corporation)
- Sister stations: WDBL

History
- Call sign meaning: From "Springfield"

Technical information
- Licensing authority: FCC
- Facility ID: 20374
- Class: D
- Power: 1,000 watts day
- Transmitter coordinates: 36°31′0.00″N 86°53′30.00″W

Links
- Public license information: Public file; LMS
- Website: wsgi1100.com

WSGI (1100 AM) is a daytime-only radio station broadcasting a Full Christian Music format. It is licensed to Springfield, Tennessee, United States, and is owned by Eliu Maldonado, through licensee Eben-ezer Broadcasting Corporation, LLC.

For more info, visit website at www.wsgi1100.com.
