= WPJK =

- Orangeburg, South Carolina; United States
- Frequency: 1580 kHz
- Branding: ESPN Orangeburg

Programming
- Format: Sports radio
- Affiliations: ESPN Radio

Ownership
- Owner: South Carolina State University

History
- First air date: November 3, 1958
- Former call signs: WBPD (1959–1961); WORG (1961–1985); WBLO (1985–1986)

Technical information
- Licensing authority: FCC
- Facility ID: 6447
- Class: D
- Power: 3,300 watts (day); 22 watts (night)
- Transmitter coordinates: 33°28′43″N 80°52′46″W
- Translator: 92.9 W225DB (Orangeburg)

Links
- Public license information: Public file; LMS
- Webcast: Listen live
- Website: espnorangeburg.com

WPJK (1580 AM) is an commercial radio station licensed to Orangeburg, South Carolina, United States, featuring a sports radio format as an ESPN Radio affiliate. The station is owned by South Carolina State University, a historically black institution and a non-profit organization.

Programming is also heard on 250-watt FM translator W224DB at 92.9 MHz.

== History ==
The station signed on the air on November 3, 1958. Its original call sign was WBPD and it was a daytimer station, required to go off the air each night. The station was a network affiliate of the Mutual Broadcasting System. During the 1960s and 70s, it was a Top 40 station.

The call letters were changed to WORG on May 14, 1984. On September 9, 1985, the station changed its call sign to WBLO, and on February 17, 1986, to the current WPJK.

On April 8, 2017, an application was filed for a construction permit to move to a new transmitter site, increase day power to 3,300 watts and add night authorization of 22 watts. The application was accepted for filing on April 18, 2017.

On April 17, 2017, WPJK filed an application with the Federal Communications Commission to transfer the license from Ermma Barton Gowdy to South Carolina State University. The purchase by South Carolina State was consummated on August 19, 2017.

On September 12, 2021, WPJK relaunched as "ESPN Orangeburg" with programming from ESPN Radio, and South Carolina Sports Talk, based out of WQXL (Columbia).
