= WEDB (FM) =

- East Dublin, Georgia; United States
- Frequency: 98.1 MHz
- Branding: Magic 98.1

Programming
- Format: Hot adult contemporary

Ownership
- Owner: Radiojones, LLC

History
- First air date: 1966
- Former call signs: WJAT-FM (1978–1985); WGKS (1985–1978); WJAT-FM (1978–1985); WELT-FM (1985–2008)
- Call sign meaning: W East DuBlin

Technical information
- Licensing authority: FCC
- Facility ID: 54832
- Class: C3
- ERP: 9,600 watts
- HAAT: 160 meters
- Transmitter coordinates: 32°32′55.00″N 82°38′49.00″W

Links
- Public license information: Public file; LMS

WEDB (98.1 FM) is a radio station broadcasting a hot adult contemporary format. Licensed to East Dublin, Georgia, United States, the station is currently owned by Radiojones, LLC.

== History ==
The station went on the air as WJAT-FM on 1978-11-29. On 1985-04-15, the station changed its call sign to WGKS, on 1988-03-28 to WJAT-FM, on 1999-04-16 to WELT, and on 2008-08-27 to the current WEDB.
