= WXRS-FM =

- Swainsboro, Georgia; United States
- Frequency: 100.5 MHz
- Branding: The Rooster 100.5

Programming
- Format: Country music
- Affiliations: ABC Radio

Ownership
- Owner: Radiojones, LLC

History
- First air date: 1982

Technical information
- Licensing authority: FCC
- Facility ID: 36212
- Class: A
- ERP: 3,000 watts
- HAAT: 91 meters
- Transmitter coordinates: 32°34′52.00″N 82°23′14.00″W

Links
- Public license information: Public file; LMS

WXRS-FM (100.5 FM) is a radio station broadcasting a country music format. Licensed to Swainsboro, Georgia, United States, the station is currently owned by Radiojones, LLC, and features programming from ABC Radio.
