= WPGY =

- Ellijay, Georgia; United States
- Frequency: 1580 kHz

Programming
- Format: Classic hits

Ownership
- Owner: Randy Gravley and Byron Dobbs; (Tri-State Communications, Inc.)
- Sister stations: WLJA-FM

History
- First air date: 1978 (as WLEJ)
- Former call signs: WLEJ (1978–1986); WLJA (1986–1999)

Technical information
- Licensing authority: FCC
- Facility ID: 36891
- Class: D
- Power: WPGY: 500 watts day
- Transmitter coordinates: 34°41′57.3″N 84°28′41.7″W
- Translators: 93.7 W229CE (Ellijay); 98.1 W251CZ (Jasper)
- Repeater: (101.1-2) WLJA-HD2 (Ellijay)

Links
- Public license information: Public file; LMS

WPGY (1580 AM) is a radio station broadcasting a classic hits format. It licensed to Ellijay, Georgia, United States, and is owned by Randy Gravley and Byron Dobbs, through licensee Tri-State Communications, Inc.

== History ==
The station was on the air as WLJA on May 14, 1986. On December 1, 1999, the station changed its call sign to the current WPGY.

== Translator ==
Call sign	Frequency	City of license	FID	ERP (W)	HAAT	Class	Transmitter coordinates	FCC info
W229CE	93.7 FM	Ellijay, Georgia	139736	250	191 m (627 ft)	D	34°37′46.3″N 84°29′28.7″W	LMS
W251CZ	98.1 FM	Jasper, Georgia	201128	200 horizontal	0 m (0 ft)	D	34°31′46.3″N 84°20′23.4″W	LMS
