= WRKK =

WRKK-AM
- Hughesville, Pennsylvania; United States
- Broadcast area: Williamsport, Pennsylvania
- Frequency: 1200 kHz

Ownership
- Owner: iHeartMedia; (IHM Licenses, LLC)

History
- First air date: June 4, 1985
- Former call signs: WHUM (1985–1990); WKHL (1990–1992); WMRE (1992–1995)
- Former frequencies: 1190 kHz (1985–1990)

Technical information
- Licensing authority: FCC
- Facility ID: 49265
- Class: B
- Power: 10,000 watts (day); 250 watts (night)
- Transmitter coordinates: 41°12′43.00″N 76°44′55.00″W

Links
- Public license information: Public file; LMS

WRKK (1200 AM) is a commercial radio station licensed to Hughesville, Pennsylvania, United States, serving the Williamsport metro area. Owned by iHeartMedia, Inc. WRKK's studios are located in Williamsport .

== History ==
On June 4, 1985, the FCC granted a construction permit to Muncy Broadcasting Inc. for the creation of a new radio station to broadcast at 1190 kHz with 1,000 watts of power, daytime only. On December 12, 1985, the station was granted a license to cover and begin regular broadcast operations.

In January 1988, the station's broadcast license was transferred from Muncy Broadcasting to Pro Marketing, Inc. In May 1989, the license was transferred again from Pro Marketing to Kennedy Broadcasting, Inc. On June 7, 1990, license transfer was consummated once again, this time from Kennedy Broadcasting to North Penn Broadcasting, Inc. In January 1995, North Penn Broadcasting reached a deal to transfer the license to Dame Media, Inc., and the transfer was consummated in July 1995. In August 1998, WRKK was transferred from Dame Media to Clear Channel Communications (acting as Clear Channel Metroplex License Inc.) as part of a 21 station deal. The stock-for-stock deal was publicly valued at $85 million.

=== Frequency change ===
On June 25, 1990, the station received a new construction permit to change frequencies from 1190 kHz to 1200 kHz, increase daytime power from 1,000 watts to 10,000 watts, add nighttime service at 250 watts, and make suitable changes in the antenna system to accommodate these changes. This construction permit expired on December 25, 1991. The station was granted a reinstatement of the expired permit in June 1993 but it too would be allowed to expire in December 1993. Another reinstatement was granted in March 1995 and set to expire in September 1995. Several extensions of this permit were granted pushing the expiration date back to May 1996, January 1997, August 1997, and April 1998. In June 1998, the station was granted a minor modification of this permit to correct the coordinates of the transmitter location and to adjust the daytime broadcast pattern but this also extended the permit until December 1998. Finally and after several months of testing, on June 23, 1998, nearly eight years to the day after first being granted the permit, the station received a new license to broadcast at 1200 kHz.

=== Rock 94.9 ===
On October 1, 2014 WRKK split from its simulcast with news/talk-formatted WRAK (1400 AM) and changed their format to active rock, branded as "Rock 94.9" (simulcast on FM translator W235BA 94.9 FM). The format moved to WBYL on August 4, 2025, after WRKK went silent due to loss of their transmitter site.
