= Matt McClure (broadcaster) =

American journalist and actor

- Born: March 30, 1981 (age 45); Gainesville, Georgia, United States
- Education: Gainesville State College
- Occupations: Manager of Media Hosting & Production, AmeriLife
- Notable credit(s): Anchor/reporter, Georgia News Network
- Website: www.mattjmcclure.com

Matt McClure is an American journalist and actor. He is currently the Manager of Media Hosting and Production at AmeriLife, where he hosts several radio shows, podcasts and TV series focusing on financial education. Previously, he was an Executive Producer for iHeartMedia's Southeast Newsroom, based in Atlanta. McClure is also a licensed financial advisor and is creator and host of the podcast, Take Pride in Retirement, which he started in 2023.

Previously, he served as an anchor for all-news TV station NY1 in New York City, an anchor/editor for the Wall Street Journal Radio Network, and talk show host for health/wellness cable channel Veria Living.

From May 2009 until January 2012, he was the co-host of Currents on New Evangelization Television (NET) in New York City. This nightly show features news and human interest stories from a Christian perspective.

Formerly, McClure was the morning anchor for the Georgia News Network, and website editor for Atlanta's 640 WGST. He first came to WGST in August 2004.

He is the recipient of seven Associated Press awards, including Best Anchor/Reporter in Georgia in 2007.

Previously, McClure was Afternoon News Supervisor for Jacobs Media Corporation (WDUN News/Talk 550, WMJE Majic 1029, WGGA SportsRadio 1240 The Ticket and AccessNorthGa.com) in Gainesville, GA. In 2006, McClure was the anchor of NewsChannel 32 Daybreak on then-CBS affiliate WNEG-TV (now WGTA) in Toccoa, Georgia.

Prior to joining Jacobs Media for the first time in February 2003, McClure was News Director and host of the afternoon show on WGTJ in Gainesville for several years. He started broadcasting in 1995 at WDGR in Dahlonega, Georgia.

McClure became producer for AM Atlanta with Tom Hughes on 640 WGST in September, 2006. He remained in this position until host Tom Hughes resigned on November 21, 2006, and was then moved into the newsroom on a full-time basis. In early 2007, he was serving as sports director and reporter.

On February 5, 2007, it was announced that veteran Atlanta morning show hosts Randy Cook and Spiff Carner would be joining the 640 WGST team for a new live and local morning show. The show began on February 26, 2007 with McClure as producer. Spiff was fired by Clear Channel a few months later, and the show continued until July 2009 as The Morning Drive with Randy Cook.

== Acting career ==
McClure has also appeared on the musical theatre stage in Georgia and Florida. He has appeared in such shows as the world premiere of Another Happy Ending (Malvolio), the NYC premiere of the play Oswald (Leavelle), Forever Plaid (Smudge), Altar Boyz (Abraham), 9 to 5 (Joe), Little Shop of Horrors (Seymour), Next Fall (Brandon), The Fantasticks (El Gallo), The Sound of Music (Franz/Von Schrieber), the Atlanta Regional premiere of Altar Boyz (Announcer/Voice of GOD), The Boy Friend (Marcel), and The Pirates of Penzance (Ensemble).

McClure was nominated for a 2013 BroadwayWorld Orlando Award for his portrayal of Seymour in Little Shop of Horrors, and a 2009 Metropolitan Atlanta Theatre Award for Best Leading Actor in a Musical for his role as El Gallo in The Fantasticks.
