= Rob Keighron =

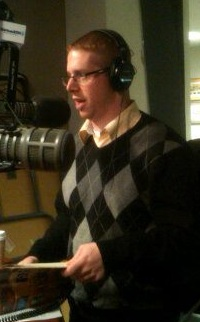
- Keighron co-hosting The Catholic Guy Show in 2012
- Born: Robert E. Keighron; December 3, 1980 (age 45); Ozone Park, Queens, New York, U.S.
- Education: Bachelor of Sacred Theology
- Alma mater: Pontifical North American College; St. John's University
- Occupations: Media personality, politician, former Roman Catholic priest
- Known for: The Catholic Guy Show

Robert E. Keighron (born December 3, 1980) is an American media personality, businessman, and politician. He formerly served as a Roman Catholic priest in the Diocese of Brooklyn before his dispensation from the clergy for personal reasons in 2014. He is known from his appearances on SiriusXM's The Catholic Guy Show with Lino Rulli from 2008 to 2014, as well as appearances with Chris Russo on various radio platforms.

== Early life and priesthood ==
Keighron was born in Queens, New York and graduated from Archbishop Molloy High School in 1998. Keighron then attended St. John's University in New York, where he graduated with a degree in philosophy in 2002. Keighron lived at the Pontifical North American College while he studied in Rome for a Bachelor of Sacred Theology degree. Keighron was then installed as parochial vicar of St. Helen Roman Catholic Church in Howard Beach, Queens. He also served as president of St. Helen Catholic Academy. In November 2012, he took up residence at the rectory of St. Joseph's Roman Catholic Church in Astoria, Queens in order to devote himself full-time to The Catholic Guy Show. On June 19, 2014, Keighron announced he would be leaving active ministry in the priesthood.

== Broadcasting career ==
Keighron's radio career began in 2003 while attending the Pontifical North American College where he was a regular contributor to Mike and the Mad Dog, a New York City-based sports radio show hosted by Chris Russo. He was known as "Rob From The Vatican" and discussed sports predictions. Following his ordination, he remained in Rome and frequently celebrated Mass on Vatican Radio. Keighron went on to host a weekly sports television series that aired on the Diocese of Brooklyn's New Evangelization Television just prior to his full venture into Catholic radio.

In August 2008, Keighron's broadcasting talent was recognized on an international platform when he appeared as a guest on SiriusXM's The Catholic Guy Show with Lino Rulli for a segment focusing on priests from various parts of the country. Following the appearance, Keighron became a frequent guest on the show with in-studio appearances each week. He was chosen to co-host alongside Rulli, as well as co-producer, in September 2011. On October 10, 2013, Keighron announced his departure as co-host of The Catholic Guy Show; his final full-time show was October 25. He indicated that he loved doing the show, and plans for future show appearances during his discernment. His final appearance on The Catholic Guy Show was June 19, 2014, following his announcement of leaving active ministry in the priesthood. His final television appearance in a priestly capacity occurred three days following the announcement, when he returned to New Evangelization Television as a guest host on In The Arena. Keighron continued to make periodic appearances on The Catholic Guy until 2015, often in character.

In 2019, Keighron returned to radio and appeared on SiriusXM's Mad Dog Sports Radio, where he provided an update on his life and announced his marriage.

As of 2026, Keighron makes regular appearances on Fox Sports Radio's The Nate Brown Show, a sports radio program and podcast, hosting a "happy hour" segment discussing current events and sports betting.

== Politics ==
In 2023, Keighron announced his candidacy for Rapid City Common Council.

== See also ==
- The Catholic Guy Show
- Lino Rulli
- The Catholic Channel
