= Generation Cross =

- Generation Cross DVD
- Created by: Lino Rulli
- Written by: Lino Rulli
- Starring: Lino Rulli
- Opening theme: "Monkey Wrench" by Foo Fighters
- Country of origin: United States
- Original language: English
- No. of seasons: 7

Production
- Executive producer: Lino Rulli
- Cinematography: Dave Dennison

Original release
- Network: Metro Cable Network (Minneapolis–Saint Paul)
- Release: 1998 – 2004

Related
- Lino at Large; The Catholic Guy

Generation Cross is an American religious comedy television series created and hosted by Lino Rulli. The show's name is derived from "Generation X", showing individuals from that generation expressing their Catholic faith in a humorous manner. It premiered in September 1998 on Metro Cable Network in Minneapolis–Saint Paul, Minnesota. Before its cancellation in 2004, it was syndicated on various religious television networks in the United States, including CatholicTV. It was also broadcast in various Catholic dioceses, via the Catholic Communication Campaign.

== Format ==
Generation Cross consists of host Lino Rulli doing various unique activities while imparting Catholic history, theology, and inspiration in a comedic manner. Activities have include exploring villages in Italy, rock climbing with a priest, and swing dancing with a nun.

== Awards ==
Title	Nominee(s)	Result	Ref
Emmy Award for Program Host (2001)	Lino Rulli	Won	
Emmy Award for Program Host (2002)	Lino Rulli	Won	
