= Jim Chern =

American Catholic priest (born 1973)

Father Jim Chern
- Chern in 2015
- Born: James Nicholas Chern; November 6, 1973 (age 52)
- Education: DeSales University; Seton Hall University
- Occupations: Roman Catholic priest, radio broadcaster
- Known for: "The Catholic Guy Show" co-host

Father James Nicholas Chern (born November 6, 1973) is a Roman Catholic priest in the Archdiocese of Newark, serving as the archdiocese's Director of Campus Ministry. He is also chaplain and director of the Newman Center at Montclair State University.

Chern is known for his appearances on The Catholic Guy Show with Lino Rulli, a radio show airing on Sirius XM Satellite Radio, from 2007 until his departure in 2019.

== Early life and education ==
Chern is the son of George and Jo Ann (née Trippodi) Chern. He has two brothers, Christopher and Craig.

Chern graduated from DeSales University in Center Valley, Pennsylvania with a degree in theology and philosophy in 1995 and received a Master of Theology degree from Seton Hall University in South Orange, New Jersey in 1999.

== Ministry ==
He was ordained on May 29, 1999 and installed parochial vicar of Our Lady of Lourdes Roman Catholic Church in West Orange, New Jersey, where he served for seven years.

In 2007, Chern was named chaplain and director of the Newman Center at Montclair State University, a position he still holds. He was named Director of Campus Ministry for the Archdiocese of Newark in 2018 by Cardinal Joseph Tobin. He has been called America's favorite college campus minister.

== Radio career ==
Chern's radio career began in August 2007 when he appeared as a guest on "The Catholic Guy Show" with Lino Rulli for a segment focusing on prayer. Chern originally got Sirius XM to listen to Howard Stern, and eventually stumbled upon Rulli's show where "for about 15 minutes, [he] couldn't tell if the show was pro-Catholic or anti-Catholic." In September 2016, after years of being a periodic guest, he was chosen to co-host alongside Rulli, appearing on Thursdays and Fridays. Chern remained co-host until his announced departure in June 2019.

== See also ==
- The Catholic Guy Show
- Lino Rulli
- The Catholic Channel
