= WDUN =

WDUN may refer to:

- WDUN (AM), a radio station (550 AM) licensed to Gainesville, Georgia, United States
- WDUN-FM, a radio station (102.9 FM) licensed to Clarkesville, Georgia
