= Currents News =

- Country of origin: United States
- Original language: English
- No. of episodes: 130

Production
- Running time: 30 minutes

Original release
- Network: NET
- Release: June 1, 2009 – present

Currents News is an American daily Catholic news magazine television program on New Evangelization Television (NET), broadcast five days a week from its studios in Brooklyn. The program examines current events through the perspective of the Catholic faith.

== History ==
In October 2008, NET hired Deacon Greg Kandra to oversee the development of the program. Kandra was a 26-year veteran of CBS News, and had won every major award in broadcasting. Kandra became NET's first Director of News, and began collaborating with Quinn and studio director Cedric Chin to create the new program. The team selected the title "Currents"—a nod to Bishop Nicholas DiMarzio's frequent exhortations to "put out into the deep," a recurring theme of the New Evangelization. (Kandra later added the tagline that appears at the beginning of every program: "The news show that goes against the tide.")

Kandra hired a news team that included local newswriter Christopher Iasiello (from 1010 WINS), coordinating producer (later Assistant News Director) Shu-Fy Pongnon, Atlanta news anchor/reporter Matt McClure, former ABC News anchor Tai Hernandez, Univision producer and reporter Nathalia Ortiz, and Sirius XM Radio personality Lino Rulli.

The program premiered on June 1, 2009, with co-anchors McClure and Hernandez, along with reporters Nathalia Ortiz and Lino Rulli.

== See also ==
- 2009 in American television
- Catholic television
- Catholic television channels
- Catholic television networks
- Religious broadcasting
