= Matt McClure =

Matt McClure may refer to:

- Matt McClure (broadcaster) (born 1981), American journalist and actor
- Matt McClure (footballer) (born 1991), English-born Northern Irish footballer
