= Eugene J. McCarthy Center for Public Policy and Civic Engagement =

United States non-partisan research center

The Eugene J. McCarthy Center for Public Policy and Civic Engagement at Saint John's University, serving the College of Saint Benedict and Saint John's University in central Minnesota, is a non-partisan learning and outreach center aimed at fostering enhanced civic engagement and dialog about public policy. The Center sponsors the annual Eugene J. McCarthy Lecture, along with a variety of other programs aimed at CSB and SJU students, alumnae, alumni, faculty and staff, and the broader community. The Center serves students at both the College of Saint Benedict and Saint John’s University.

== History ==
The Center was founded in 2006 in honor of Eugene J. McCarthy, the late Senator and 1935 Saint John’s graduate. The McCarthy Center is directed by Dr. Matt Lindstrom. Lindstrom is currently the Edward L. Henry Professor of Political Science at the College of Saint Benedict and Saint John’s University.

== Mission statement ==
The McCarthy Center aims: To cultivate the habit of promoting the common good through an integrative environment for learning and To promote the value of politics; our shared identity as citizens; our engagement in public work.

== Programs ==
=== Eugene J. McCarthy Lecture ===
The annual public lectureship was established in honor of McCarthy's focus on democratic self-government. According to its organizers, the series aims to encourage civic engagement, community involvement, and public leadership among young people.

==== Past lecturers ====
2007: E.J. Dionne 2008: Julian Bond 2009: Chuck Hagel 2010: Amy Klobuchar 2011: Mark Shields 2012: Tom Brokaw 2013: Cokie Roberts

=== Mentor Program ===
The McCarthy Center Mentor Program connects CSB and SJU students with individual political and community leaders and offers a roadmap for mentorship and networking. Through informational interviews, job shadowing, resume critiques, and career discussions, students gain a greater awareness of multiple civic options as well as avenues for success in political and civic life.

==== Polidazzle ====
Each December, the McCarthy Center hosts Polidazzle, a Mentor Program networking event for CSB/SJU students, alumni, staff, and faculty interested in public policy and civic life. The open-house reception gives current students the opportunity to connect with alumni engaged in civic and political work as professionals or volunteers while enjoying conversation, drinks, and hors d’oeuvres.

=== Politics and a Pint ===
The McCarthy Center sponsors this monthly series of informal discussions on issues related to public policy and politics, that is, any type of social interaction involving decision-making. "Politics and a Pint" invites faculty members, student leaders, administrators, alums, politicians and community members to talk with students in an informal atmosphere without academic pressures, and about current issues which may normally not enter the classroom.

Politics and a Pint is held at Brother Willie's Pub at St. John's University. All majors and all ages are welcome to attend any portion of Politics and a Pint. Pizza and non-alcoholic beverages are always provided. Attendees age 21 and over may purchase pints at the BWP bar.

=== Study tours ===
The McCarthy Center believes in the importance of experiential learning as a way to engage students in the many layers of the policy making process. Study tours bring students face-to-face with key players and organizations working on current policy issues.

In the 2012–2013 academic year, the McCarthy Center led two study tours to Washington, D.C. While on the week-long trip, students experienced United States history and culture—touring the Capitol Building, the White House, the State Department and many, many monuments.

=== McCarthy Residency ===
The McCarthy Residency showcases the work and skills of someone who has a distinguished career in public service, policy, or politics through a week-long on-campus residency. Through visits to classes, cafeterias, practices, and public programs, the McCarthy resident engages a wide spectrum of the CSB/SJU community and the general public. The McCarthy residency culminates in a dinner honoring the resident and a final keynote program open to the campus community and the public. The primary purpose of the residency is to give students extended access to someone with real knowledge and wisdom about policy, civic engagement, and public life.

Past recipients

- Al Eisele 1958, Editor of The Hill
- Dave Durenberger 1955, former U.S. Senator
- Sean Kershaw, CEO of the Citizens League
- Kathleen Hall Jamieson of the Annenberg Public Policy Center of the University of Pennsylvania
- John Chromy 1964, CHF International
- Gary Eichten 1969, Minnesota Public Radio News
- Lino Rulli 1993, SOT 1995, host of The Catholic Guy Show

=== CSBSJU Political Science Department's Washington, D.C. Summer Study ===
The McCarthy Center supports the Political Science Department's Washington, D.C. Summer Study Program, which sends a group of students to Washington, D.C. every summer to serve as interns in government, political, or non-profit offices while earning academic credit.

== Scholarships ==
=== John E. Brandl ===
John Brandl was a 1959 graduate of Saint John's. The John Brandl Scholars program celebrates Brandl's lifelong commitment to mentorship and scholarship in higher education, public policy and politics. The endowment funds summer internships in public policy and leadership development activities such as conferences and trainings. These internships will range from local to international policy arenas, reflecting Brandl's diverse career and CSB/SJU's commitment to ethical leadership and the common good.

John Brandl Scholars receive $4,000 summer stipends and are offered select invitations for McCarthy Center events and mini-grants to cover travel or other expenses related to civic or scholarly engagement.

== Funding ==
Funding for the McCarthy Center was originally provided through a grant from the Bush Foundation to sponsor "learning centers" at CSB/SJU. A permanent endowment has been created through the support of the Whalen Foundation.
