= Maury Wills =

American baseball player and manager (1932–2022)

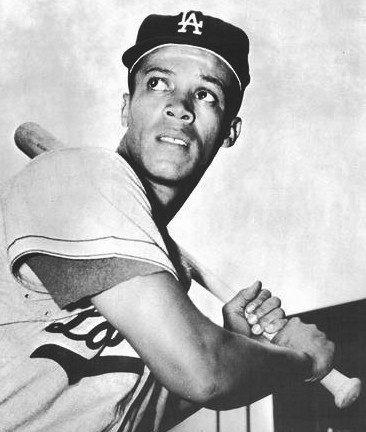
- Wills with the Los Angeles Dodgers in 1961
- Shortstop / Manager
- Born: October 2, 1932; Washington, D.C., U.S.
- Died: September 19, 2022 (aged 89); Sedona, Arizona, U.S.
- Batted: Switch Threw: Right

MLB debut
- June 6, 1959, for the Los Angeles Dodgers

Last MLB appearance
- October 4, 1972, for the Los Angeles Dodgers

MLB statistics
- Batting average: .281
- Hits: 2,134
- Home runs: 20
- Runs batted in: 458
- Stolen bases: 586
- Managerial record: 26–56
- Winning %: .317
- Stats at Baseball Reference

Teams
- As player: Los Angeles Dodgers (1959–1966); Pittsburgh Pirates (1967–1968); Montreal Expos (1969); Los Angeles Dodgers (1969–1972); As manager: Seattle Mariners (1980–1981)

Career highlights and awards
- 7× All-Star (1961–1963, 1965, 1966); 3× World Series champion (1959, 1963, 1965); NL MVP (1962); 2× Gold Glove Award (1961, 1962); 6× NL stolen base leader (1960–1965); Legend of Dodger Baseball

Maurice Morning Wills (October 2, 1932 – September 19, 2022) was an American professional baseball player and manager. He played in Major League Baseball as a shortstop from 1959 to 1972, most prominently as an integral member of the Los Angeles Dodgers teams that won three World Series titles between 1959 and 1965. He also played for the Pittsburgh Pirates and the Montreal Expos. Wills is credited with reviving the stolen base as part of baseball strategy.

Wills was the National League Most Valuable Player (MVP) in 1962, stealing a record 104 bases to break the old modern-era mark of 96, set by Ty Cobb in 1915. Wills was an All-Star for five seasons and seven All-Star Games, and was the first MLB All-Star Game Most Valuable Player in 1962. He also won Gold Gloves in 1961 and 1962. In a fourteen-year career, Wills batted .281 with 20 home runs, 458 runs batted in, 2,134 hits, 1,067 runs, 177 doubles, 71 triples, 586 stolen bases, and 552 bases on balls in 1,942 games. Wills briefly managed the Seattle Mariners in parts of the 1980 and 1981 seasons. From 2009 until his death in 2022, Wills was a member of the Los Angeles Dodgers organization, serving as a representative of the Dodgers Legend Bureau.

== Early life ==
Wills was born in Washington, D.C., to Guy and Mabel Wills, the seventh of 13 children. His parents were originally from Maryland; his father, born in 1900, worked as a machinist at the Washington Navy Yard and was a part-time Baptist minister. His mother, born in 1902, worked as an elevator operator.

He began playing semi-professional baseball at age 14. At Cardozo Senior High School, Wills starred in baseball, basketball, and football. He earned All-City honors in each sport in his sophomore, junior, and senior years. On the baseball team, he played third base and also pitched.

== Professional career ==
=== Minor leagues ===
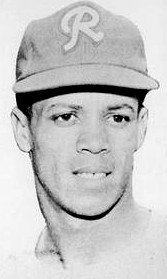
Wills as a member of the Seattle Rainiers in 1957

Wills signed with the then-Brooklyn Dodgers in 1950, after graduating from high school. He spent eight years in the minor leagues for them. Before the 1959 season, the Detroit Tigers bought his contract for $35,000, but they returned Wills to the Dodgers after spring training because they did not think he was worth that salary.

=== Los Angeles Dodgers ===
Pee Wee Reese, the Dodgers' shortstop, retired after the 1958 season. The Dodgers began the 1959 season with Bob Lillis at shortstop, but he struggled and the team went to Don Zimmer. When Zimmer broke his toe in June, the Dodgers promoted Wills from the minor leagues. He played in 83 games for the Dodgers, batting .260 with 7 RBI. In the 1959 World Series, he played in each of the six games, hitting 5-for-20 with one stolen base and two runs in the Dodgers' victory. Before the 1960 season, the Dodgers traded Zimmer. In Wills's first full season in 1960, he hit .295 with 27 RBI and a league-leading 50 stolen bases in 148 games, becoming the first National League (NL) player to steal 50 bases since Max Carey stole 51 in 1923.

In 1962, Wills stole 104 bases to set a new MLB stolen base record, breaking the old modern era mark of 96, set by Ty Cobb in 1915. Wills also stole more bases than any team that year, the highest total being 99 by the Washington Senators. Wills was caught stealing just 13 times. He finished the season batting .299 with six home runs and 48 RBI, and led the NL with 10 triples and 179 singles. Late in the 1962 season, San Francisco Giants Manager Alvin Dark ordered grounds crews to water down the base paths, turning them into mud to hinder Wills's base-stealing attempts. In 1962, Wills played a full 162-game schedule, plus all three games of the best-of-three regular season playoff series with the Giants, giving him a total of 165 games played, an MLB record that, as of 2025, still stands, and would be almost impossible to break under current rules. His 104 steals remained a major league record until Lou Brock stole 118 in 1974. He won the NL Most Valuable Player Award over Willie Mays, with teammate Tommy Davis finishing third.

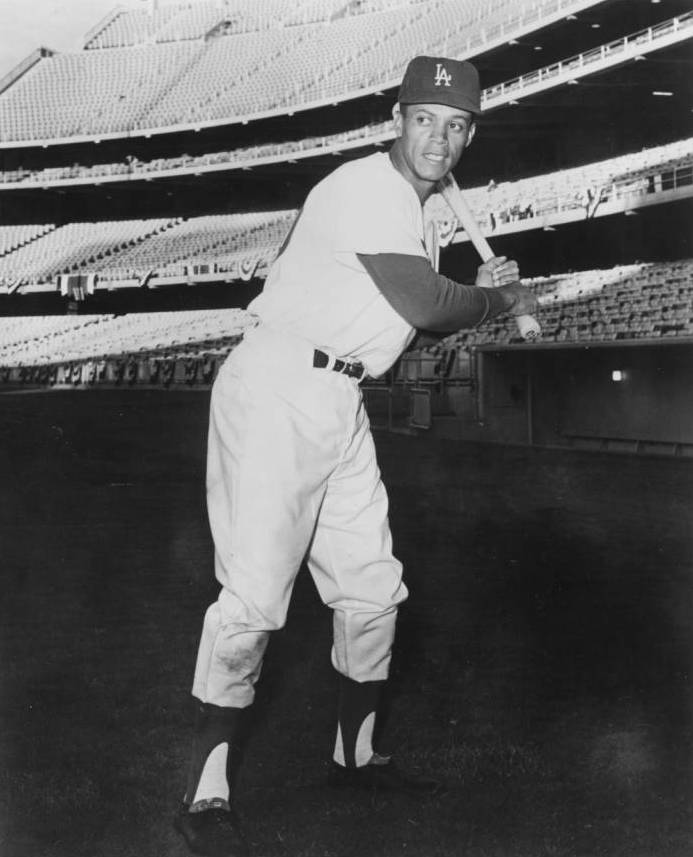
Wills with the Dodgers, circa 1960

In the 1963 World Series, Wills batted 2-for-16 (.133) with one stolen base in the Dodgers' four-game sweep of the New York Yankees. In the 1965 World Series, he played in all seven games and went 11-for-30 (.367) with three runs and three stolen bases in a hard-fought Dodger victory, his third and last World Series title.

While playing for the Dodgers, Wills was a Gold Glove Award winner in 1961 and 1962, was named a NL All-Star five times (5 seasons), and was selected seven times for the All-Star Game (two games were played in 1961 and 1962).

In the 1966 season, Wills had 38 stolen bases and was caught stealing 24 times. He batted 1-for-13, an .077 average, with one stolen base, in the 1966 World Series, as the Dodgers were swept in four games.

=== Pittsburgh Pirates ===
After the 1966 season, the Dodgers went on a postseason exhibition tour of Japan. During the tour, Wills, who was nursing bad knees and felt he was unable to perform, left in the middle and went back home. His leaving was seen as abandonment and disloyalty by Dodgers owner Walter O'Malley who was already irked at losing pitcher Sandy Koufax who had recently retired. Hence, almost as a punishment, the team traded Wills to the Pittsburgh Pirates for Bob Bailey and Gene Michael.

In the 1967 season, he played in 149 games, recording 186 hits, 29 stolen bases (his lowest since having 35 in 1961), three home runs, 45 RBI, and a .302 batting average. In the following season, he played in 153 games, getting 174 hits, 31 RBI, and 52 stolen bases, although he was caught stealing 21 times, with a .278 batting average.

=== Montreal Expos ===
On October 14, 1968, the Montreal Expos selected Wills from the Pirates as the 21st pick in the expansion draft. Wills batted first in the lineup for the inaugural game of the Expos on April 8, 1969. He went 3-for-6 with one RBI and one stolen base in the 11–10 win. He played just 47 games for the team, getting 42 hits, 8 RBI and 15 stolen bases on a .222 batting average. An exchange with Ted Blackman of the Montreal Gazette on May 19 made headlines when Wills struck Blackman in the mouth due to not liking what Blackman had put in the paper, and loose play by Wills later that month led to boos in Montreal. Unhappy in Montreal, Wills briefly retired on June 3 but returned to the Expos 48 hours later.

=== Back to the Dodgers ===
On June 11, 1969, the Expos traded Wills to the Dodgers along with Manny Mota for Ron Fairly and Paul Popovich. In 104 games with Los Angeles, he batted .297 with four home runs and 39 RBI while stealing 25 bases. After the season, Wills finished 11th in NL MVP voting. In the following year, he played in 132 games while having 141 hits, 34 RBI 28 stolen bases, and a .270 batting average. For 1971, he played in 149 games while having 169 hits, three home runs, 44 RBI, 15 stolen bases, and a .281 batting average, resulting in a sixth-place finish in NL MVP voting. However, Wills failed to work out during the 1972 Major League Baseball strike, and once the season finally started, he struggled with his reflexes and timing. After a game against the Expos in which he struggled against Carl Morton, Wills went back to the bench, nodded at manager Walter Alston, and remarked, "He's certainly justified if he takes me out." Alston did indeed replace Wills in the lineup with Bill Russell on April 29, and Wills spent the rest of the season as a reserve player while Russell went on to hold the position for the next several years.

Wills played 71 games in 1972, recording 17 hits, 4 RBI and one stolen base and a .129 batting average. In his final MLB appearance on October 4, 1972, he served as a pinch runner for Ron Cey in the top of the ninth inning, scoring a run on a home run by Steve Yeager while also playing the bottom of the ninth inning at third base. On October 24, 1972, he was released by the Dodgers.

=== Base stealing ===
Alongside Chicago White Sox shortstop Luis Aparicio (who led the American League in stolen bases in nine straight years), Wills brought new prominence to the tactic of stolen bases. "Almost single-handedly Maury turned baseball from its love affair with plodding, one-dimensional sluggers and got the game to consider pure speed as serious offensive and defensive weapons," noted Tommy John. Perhaps it was due to greater media exposure in Los Angeles, or to the Dodgers' greater success, or to their extreme reliance on a low-scoring strategy that emphasized pitching, defense, and Wills's speed to compensate for their lack of productive hitters. Wills was a significant distraction to the pitcher even if he did not try to steal, because he was a constant threat to do so. The fans at Dodger Stadium would chant, "Go! Go! Go, Maury, Go!" any time he got on base. While not the fastest runner in the major leagues, Wills accelerated with remarkable speed. He also studied pitchers relentlessly, watching their pick-off moves even when not on base. And when driven back to the bag, his fierce competitiveness made him determined to steal. Once, when on first base against New York Mets pitcher Roger Craig, Wills drew twelve consecutive throws from Craig to the Mets first baseman. On Craig's next pitch to the plate, Wills stole second.

In the wake of his record-breaking season, Wills's stolen base totals dropped precipitously. Though he continued to frighten pitchers once on base, he stole only 40 bases in 1963 and 53 bases in 1964. In July 1965, Wills was ahead of his 1962 pace. However, at age 32, Wills began to slow in the second half. The punishment of sliding led him to bandage his legs before every game, and he ended the 1965 season with 94 stolen bases.

== Managing and retirement ==
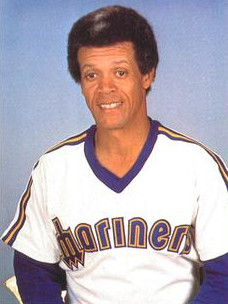
Wills with the Seattle Mariners in 1981

After retiring from playing professional baseball, Wills spent time as a baseball analyst at NBC from 1973 through 1977. He also managed in the Mexican Pacific League, a winter league, for four seasons, during which time he led the Naranjeros de Hermosillo to the 1970–71 season league championship. Wills let it be known he felt qualified to pilot a big-league club. In his book, How To Steal A Pennant, Wills claimed he could take any last-place club and make them champions within four years. The San Francisco Giants allegedly offered him a one-year deal, but Wills turned them down. In August 1980, the Seattle Mariners fired Darrell Johnson and named Wills their manager.

According to the Seattle Post-Intelligencer's Steve Rudman, Wills made a number of gaffes. He called for a relief pitcher although there was nobody warming up in the bullpen, held up another game for 10 minutes while looking for a pinch-hitter, and even left a spring-training game in the sixth inning to fly to California.

On April 25, 1981, Wills ordered the Mariners' grounds crew to make the batter's boxes one foot longer than regulation, after receiving complaints that Tom Paciorek was batting outside the box. The extra foot was in the direction of the mound. However, Oakland Athletics manager Billy Martin noticed something was amiss and asked plate umpire Bill Kunkel to investigate. Under questioning from Kunkel, the Mariners' head groundskeeper admitted Wills had ordered the change. Wills claimed he was trying to help his players stay in the box. However, Martin suspected that given the large number of breaking ball pitchers on the A's staff, Wills wanted to give his players an advantage. The American League suspended Wills for two games and fined him $500. American League umpiring supervisor Dick Butler likened Wills's actions to decreasing the distance between the bases from 90 feet (27.4 m) to 88 feet (26.8 m).

After leading Seattle to a 20–38 mark to end the 1980 season, new owner George Argyros fired Wills on May 6, 1981, with the Mariners deep in last place at 6–18. His career record was 26–56, for a winning percentage of .317, one of the worst ever for a non-interim manager.

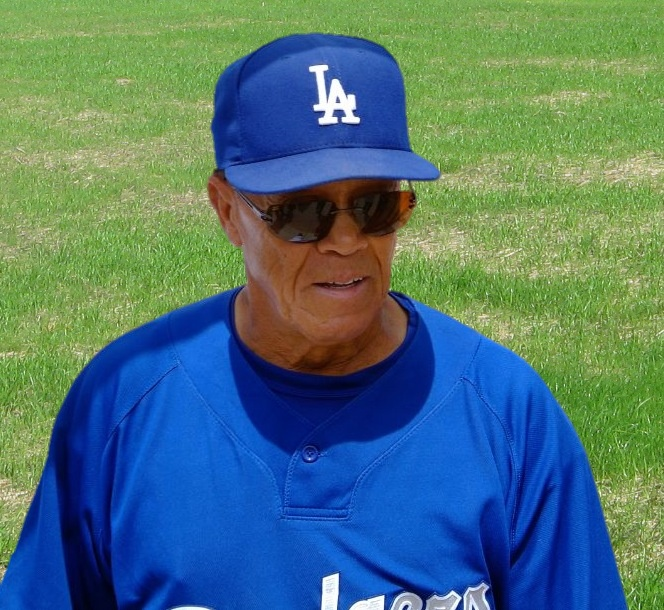
Wills with the Dodgers during spring training in 2009

However, Julio Cruz, himself an accomplished base stealer, credited Wills with teaching him how to steal second base against a left-handed pitcher. Dave Roberts similarly credits Wills with coaching him to steal under pressure circumstances, particularly his crucial stolen base in Game 4 of the 2004 American League Championship Series. "He said, 'DR, one of these days you're going to have to steal an important base when everyone in the ballpark knows you're gonna steal, but you've got to steal that base and you can't be afraid to steal that base.' So, just kind of trotting out on to the field that night, I was thinking about him. So he was on one side telling me 'this was your opportunity.' And the other side of my brain is saying, 'You're going to get thrown out, don't get thrown out.' Fortunately Maury's voice won out in my head."

Wills was a coach on the team from 1996 to 1997 and served as a radio color commentator for the Fargo-Moorhead RedHawks on KNFL until 2017. He resumed making appearances with the Dodgers in 2000, serving as a guest instructor in spring training until 2016.

== Hall of Fame candidacy ==
As a BBWAA candidate, Wills was on the Baseball Hall of Fame ballot for fifteen years, from 1978 to 1992, but never received more than 40.6% of the vote, falling far short of the required 75% to be elected. His vote total fell to half after 1982 and his subsequent arrest in 1983 for cocaine possession likely played a part in why his numbers never recovered.

In 2014, Wills appeared for the first time as a candidate on the Golden Era Committee election ballot for Hall of Fame induction in 2015, which required 12 votes. However, he missed getting elected by three votes. All the other candidates on the ballot also missed being elected.

The Golden Era Committee was replaced in 2016 by the four committees, including Golden Days Committee which covered the period from 1950 to 1969. Wills was on the 2022 ballot but he did not receive enough votes for induction.

== Entertainment career ==
Throughout most of his major league playing career, Wills supplemented his salary in the off-season by performing extensively as a vocalist and instrumentalist (on banjo, guitar, and ukulele), appearing occasionally on television and frequently in night clubs. He also cut at least two records during this period—one under his own name, the other as featured vocalist with Lionel Hampton. For roughly two years, starting on October 24, 1968, Wills was the co-owner, operator, and featured performer of a nightclub, The Stolen Base (also known as Maury Wills' Stolen Base), located in Pittsburgh's Golden Triangle and offering a mix of "banjos, draft beer and baseball."

By no account, least of all his own, was Wills a consummate virtuoso; "good; not great, maybe, but good," wrote Newsday's Stan Isaacs, reviewing a 1966 Basin Street East engagement shared with World Series nemesis Mudcat Grant (although Isaacs did single out "a few mean choruses on banjo"). Nonetheless, the level of proficiency attained on Wills's principal instrument was attested to on two separate occasions by the American Federation of Musicians: first, in December 1962, when the president of Los Angeles Local 47, after hearing just a few minutes of banjo playing, promptly waived the balance of Wills's membership entrance exam, and then, just over five years later, when trumpeter Charlie Teagarden, specifically citing "Maury's banjo-playing ability" (and evidently unaware of Wills's already established membership), "presented him, on behalf of the musicians union, an honorary lifetime membership."

In 1969, Wills appeared in an episode of the television series Get Smart, entitled "Apes of Wrath" (season 5, episode 10).

In 1965, Wills recorded two songs for the album The Sound Of The Dodgers: "Dodger Stadium" (with teammate Willie Davis and comedian Stubby Kaye) and "Somebody's Keeping Score".

== Personal life ==
After receiving the Hickok Belt in 1962, Wills was determined by the Commissioner of Internal Revenue to have deficiencies in reported income and awards deductions. The United States Tax Court supported the Commissioner and the tax case was brought up to the United States Court of Appeals for the Ninth Circuit, which affirmed the decision.

In his 1992 autobiography, On the Run: The Never Dull and Often Shocking Life of Maury Wills, Wills discussed his love affair with actress Doris Day. Day had previously denied this in her 1976 autobiography Doris Day: Her Own Story.

Wills abused alcohol and cocaine until 1989. He wrote in his autobiography, "In 3 1/2 years, I spent more than $1 million of my own money on cocaine." In December 1983, Wills was arrested for cocaine possession after his former girlfriend, Judy Aldrich, had reported her car stolen. During a search of the car, police found a vial allegedly containing .06 grams of cocaine and a water pipe. The charge was dismissed three months later on the grounds of insufficient evidence. The Dodgers organization paid for a drug treatment program, but Wills walked out and continued to use drugs until he began a relationship with Angela George, who encouraged him to begin a vitamin therapy program. The two later married.

Wills is the father of former major leaguer Bump Wills, who played for the Texas Rangers and Chicago Cubs for six seasons. Due to a salacious anecdote in the elder Wills's autobiography, the two had a falling out, but as of 2004 occasionally spoke.

In 2009, Wills was honored by Washington, D.C., and Cardozo Senior High School with the renaming of the former Banneker Recreation Field as Maury Wills Field. The field was completely renovated and serves as Cardozo's home diamond. The Maury Wills Museum in Fargo, North Dakota, at Newman Outdoor Field, home of the Fargo-Moorhead RedHawks, opened in 2001 and closed in 2017 when he retired.

Wills died at his home in Sedona, Arizona, on September 19, 2022, at age 89, just two weeks shy of his 90th birthday.

== Other awards ==
- Hickok Belt Award (1962)
- The Baseball Reliquary's Shrine of the Eternals (class of 2011)
- "Legends of Dodger Baseball" (2022)

== The stolen base "asterisk" ==
While Wills had broken Cobb's single season stolen base record in 1962, the National League had increased its number of games played per team that year from 154 to 162. Wills's 97th stolen base occurred after his team had played its 154th game; as a result, Commissioner Ford Frick ruled that Wills's 104-steal season and Cobb's 96-steal season of 1915 were separate records, just as he had the year before (the American League had also increased its number of games played per team to 162) after Roger Maris had broken Babe Ruth's single-season home run record. Both stolen base records were broken in 1974 by Lou Brock's 118 steals; Brock broke Cobb's stolen base record by stealing his 97th base before his St. Louis Cardinals completed their 154th game.

== See also ==
- List of Major League Baseball career hits leaders
- List of Major League Baseball career runs scored leaders
- List of Major League Baseball stolen base records
- List of Major League Baseball career stolen bases leaders
- List of Major League Baseball annual stolen base leaders
- List of Major League Baseball annual triples leaders
- Major League Baseball titles leaders

Awards and achievements
Preceded by Ty Cobb	Major League Baseball single season stolen base record holder 1962–1974	Succeeded by Lou Brock
