= Vin Scully =

American sportscaster (1927–2022)

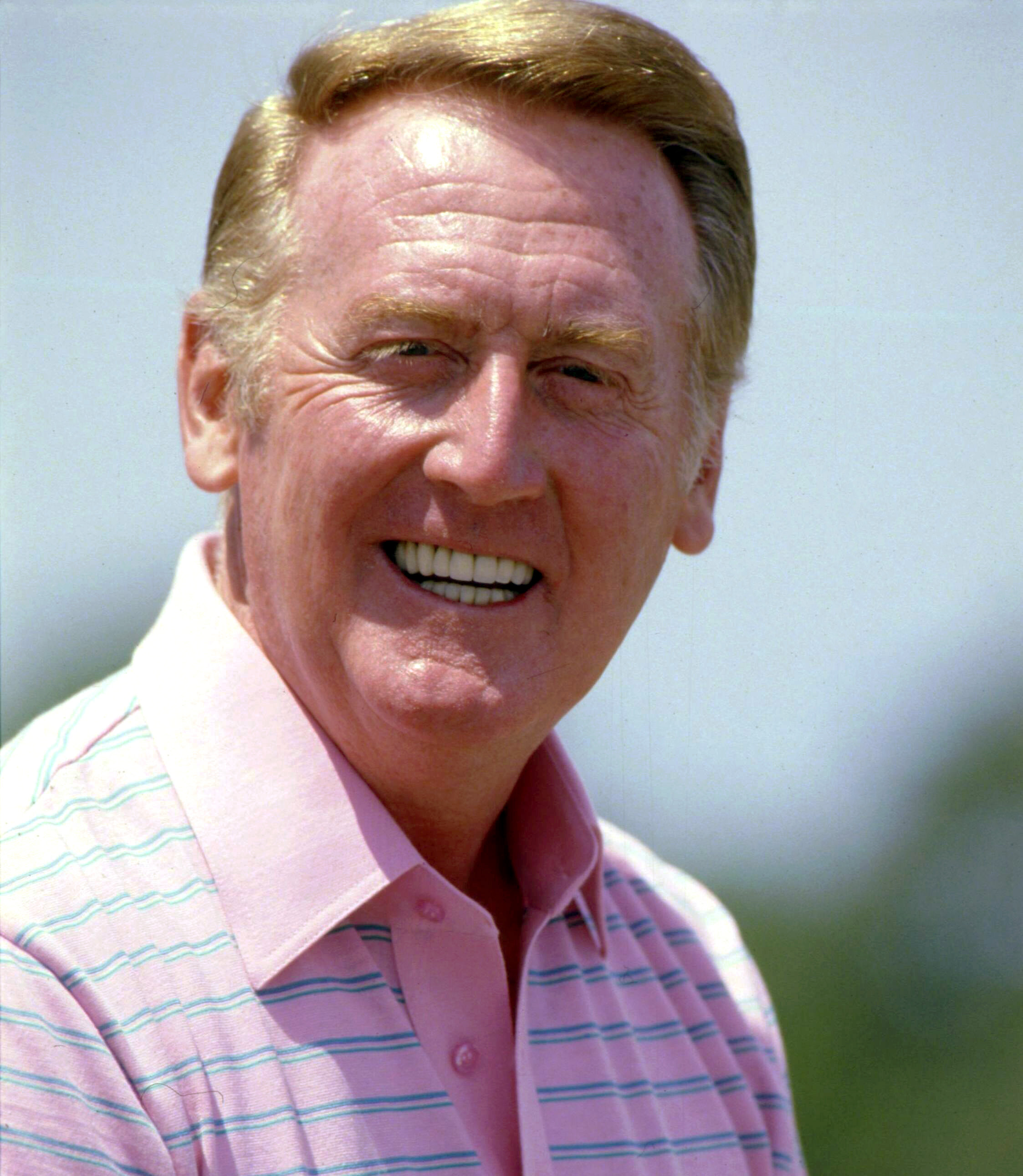
- Scully in 1985
- Born: Vincent Edward Scully; November 29, 1927; New York City, U.S.
- Died: August 2, 2022 (aged 94); Hidden Hills, California, U.S.
- Education: Fordham University (B.A.)
- Occupation: Sportscaster
- Years active: 1949–2016
- Spouses: Joan Crawford (m. 1957; died 1972) Sandra Hunt (m. 1973; died 2021)
- Children: 4
- Awards: Ford C. Frick Award (1982); Commissioner's Historic Achievement Award (2014); Presidential Medal of Freedom (2016); Hollywood Walk of Fame Star; Los Angeles Dodgers "microphone" retired
- Sports commentary career
- Team: Brooklyn Dodgers / Los Angeles Dodgers (1950–2016)
- Genre: Play-by-play
- Sports: Major League Baseball; NFL football PGA Tour golf
- Employer: CBS Sports (1975–1982); NBC Sports (1983–1989)

Vincent Edward Scully (November 29, 1927 – August 2, 2022) was an American sportscaster, best known for his broadcast work in Major League Baseball. He was the play-by-play announcer for the Brooklyn / Los Angeles Dodgers for 67 years, beginning in 1950 and ending in 2016.

Born in the Bronx, New York City, Scully attended Fordham University where he played baseball before becoming a student broadcaster and journalist. After being mentored by Dodgers broadcaster Red Barber early in his career, Scully was hired by the Brooklyn Dodgers in 1950, and moved with them to Los Angeles in 1958. He became known for his distinctive tenor voice and lyrically descriptive style. Scully's tenure with the Dodgers was the longest of any broadcaster with a single team in professional sports history. He retired at age 88 after the 2016 season.

In addition to Dodgers baseball, Scully called various nationally televised football and golf contests for CBS Sports from 1975 to 1982, and was the lead baseball play-by-play announcer for NBC Sports from 1983 to 1989. He also called the World Series for CBS Radio from 1979 to 1982 and again from 1990 to 1997.

For his long and distinguished career, Scully was honored with a star of the Hollywood Walk of Fame and was inducted into the National Radio Hall of Fame and NAB Broadcasting Hall of Fame. For his services to baseball, he was honored with the Ford C. Frick Award by the Baseball Hall of Fame in 1982. Prior to his final season, the Dodgers honored Scully by renaming the street leading towards Dodger Stadium to "Vin Scully Avenue". That same year, he was awarded the Presidential Medal of Freedom by President Barack Obama.

== Early life ==
Born on November 29, 1927, in the Bronx, Scully grew up in the Washington Heights section of Manhattan. His father, Vincent Aloysius Scully, was a silk salesman; his mother, Bridget (née Freehill), was a homemaker. He was of Irish descent. His biological father died of pneumonia when Scully was four, and his mother later married an English merchant sailor named Allan Reeve, whom Scully considered "my dad". He had one sibling, a younger sister who died of brain cancer in 2002, aged 67. Scully attended Fordham Preparatory School in the Bronx. He worked delivering beer and mail, pushing garment racks and cleaning silver in the basement of the Pennsylvania Hotel in New York City.

Scully discovered his love of baseball at age eight when he saw the results of the second game of the 1936 World Series at a laundromat and felt a pang of sympathy for the badly defeated New York Giants, who had lost the game 18–4 to the New York Yankees. Since he lived near the Polo Grounds and because he was a member of the NYC Police Athletic League and Catholic Youth Organization, he was able to attend games for free and became a "very big Giants fan".

== Broadcasting career ==
=== Fordham and CBS Radio ===
After serving in the United States Navy for two years, Scully began his career as a student broadcaster and journalist at Fordham University, where he majored in English. While at Fordham, he helped found its FM radio station WFUV (which now presents a Vin Scully Lifetime Achievement Award each year), was assistant sports editor for Volume 28 of The Fordham Ram his senior year, sang in a barbershop quartet, played center field for the Fordham Rams baseball team, called radio broadcasts for Rams baseball, football, and basketball, earned a degree, and sent about 150 letters to stations along the Eastern seaboard. He received only one response, from CBS Radio affiliate WTOP in Washington, D.C., which hired him as a fill-in.

Red Barber, the sports director of the CBS Radio Network, recruited Scully for its college football coverage. Scully impressed his boss with his coverage of a November 1949 University of Maryland versus Boston University football game from frigid Fenway Park in Boston, despite having to do so from the stadium roof. Expecting an enclosed press box, Scully had left his coat and gloves at his hotel, but never mentioned his discomfort on the air; the game proved an exciting affair that attracted Barber to ask him for further assignments. Barber mentored Scully, and Scully would follow Barber's advice on being an impartial announcer without blatant "homer" connections. When the Dodgers moved to Los Angeles, management had approached Scully about taking a pro-Dodger tone now that the team was the only one in its city (as the minor league Los Angeles teams had done) to which Scully responded weeks later by saying he would stick to objective and factual coverage.

=== Dodgers (1950–2016) ===
"It's time for Dodger baseball! Hi, everybody, and a very pleasant good afternoon/evening to you, wherever you may be."

— Scully's signature introduction to Dodger games.

==== Brooklyn (1950–1957) ====
After Ernie Harwell left the Dodgers' radio and television booths for the crosstown Giants before the 1950 season, Scully replaced him, joining Barber and Connie Desmond.

When Barber got into a salary dispute with World Series sponsor Gillette prior to the 1953 World Series, Scully took Barber's spot in the NBC television booth, becoming the youngest person to broadcast a World Series (a record that stands to this day). After Barber subsequently left the Dodgers to work for the New York Yankees beginning in 1954, Scully became the team's principal announcer, working with Desmond (1954–56), André Baruch (1954–55), Al Helfer (1955–57), and Jerry Doggett (1957). Scully was in the booth when the Brooklyn Dodgers won the 1955 World Series, their only championship in Brooklyn. He announced Dodgers games in Brooklyn until 1957, after which the club moved to Los Angeles.

==== Los Angeles (1958–2016) ====
Beginning with the 1958 season, Scully accompanied the Dodgers to their new location and quickly became popular in Southern California. During the Dodgers' first four seasons in Los Angeles, inexperienced baseball fans had difficulty following the action in the very large Los Angeles Memorial Coliseum, and it soon became common for them to bring transistor radios to the games to hear Scully and Jerry Doggett describe the action, a practice that continued even after the team moved to the much smaller Dodger Stadium for the 1962 baseball season. Radio and television engineers often had difficulty compensating for the sound of Scully's play-by-play reverberating through the stands at Dodgers home games.

In 1964, the New York Yankees offered Scully the job to replace the recently fired Mel Allen as their lead play-by-play announcer. Scully declined the offer and chose to remain with the Dodgers. By 1976, his popularity in Los Angeles had become such that Dodger fans voted him the "most memorable personality" in the history of the franchise.

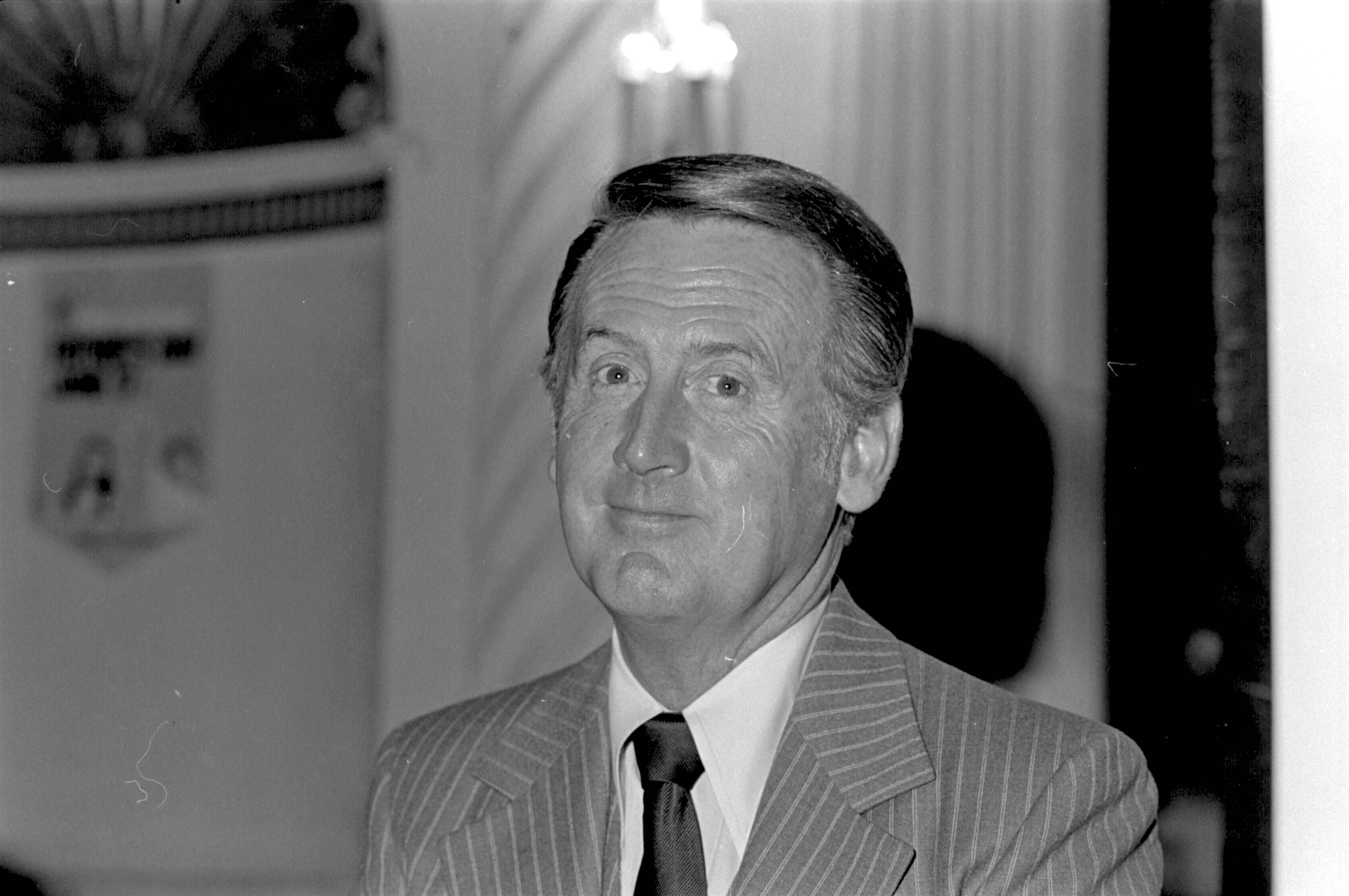
Scully in 1979

Before 1966, local announcers exclusively called the World Series. Typically, the Gillette Company, the Commissioner of Baseball and NBC television would choose the announcers, who would represent each of the teams that were in the World Series for the respective year. For the 1966 World Series, Curt Gowdy called half of each game before ceding the microphone to Vin Scully in Los Angeles, and Chuck Thompson in Baltimore. Scully was not satisfied with the arrangement as he said "What about the road? My fans won't be able to hear me." In Game 1 of the 1966 World Series, Scully called the first 4½ innings. When Gowdy inherited the announcing reins, Scully was so upset that he refused to say another word.

Unlike the typical modern style in which multiple sportscasters have an on-air conversation (usually with one functioning as play-by-play announcer and another as color commentator), Scully and his broadcast partners Jerry Doggett (1956–87) and Ross Porter (1977–2004) each called their innings solo, rotating between radio and television, with Scully working the entire game except for the 3rd and 7th innings. When Doggett retired after the 1987 season, he was replaced by Hall-of-Fame Dodgers pitcher Don Drysdale, who previously broadcast games for the California Angels. Drysdale died in his hotel room following a heart attack before a game against the Montreal Expos in 1993, resulting in a very difficult broadcast for Scully and Porter, who were told of the death but could not mention it on-air until Drysdale's family had been notified and the official announcement of the death made. Scully announced the news of his death by saying, "Never have I been asked to make an announcement that hurts me as much as this one. And I say it to you as best I can with a broken heart." Former outfielder Rick Monday succeeded Drysdale in the Dodgers' broadcast crew.

On August 28, 2015, the Dodgers announced—via a series of cue cards presented by comedian Jimmy Kimmel on the Dodger Stadium video board—that Scully would be back for the 2016 season, his 67th with the Dodgers. At a press conference August 29, Scully said 2016 would probably be his final year. "I mean, how much longer can you go on fooling people? So yeah, I would be saying, 'Dear God, if you give me next year, I will hang it up.'"

Scully's final regular season game broadcast from Dodger Stadium occurred on September 25, 2016, as the Dodgers defeated the Colorado Rockies 4-3 on a walk-off home run by Charlie Culberson to clinch the National League West Division title. His final game was broadcast from San Francisco's Oracle Park on October 2, 2016.

=== CBS Sports (1975–1982) ===
From 1975 to 1982, Scully was employed by CBS Sports, where his most prominent assignment was calling National Football League (NFL) telecasts. He worked alongside several different color analysts, including Sonny Jurgensen, Paul Hornung, Alex Hawkins, George Allen, Jim Brown, John Madden, and Hank Stram. Scully called Dwight Clark's touchdown catch in the NFC Championship Game on January 10, 1982, which put the San Francisco 49ers into Super Bowl XVI. It was the final NFL game he announced. "This was a hell of a game to quit doing football," he commented.

Scully also contributed to CBS's PGA Tour golf coverage, usually working with Pat Summerall, Ken Venturi, and Ben Wright. From 1975 to 1982, he was part of the team that covered the Masters Tournament for CBS. He also worked occasional tennis events for CBS. Scully's CBS commitments led to his working a reduced schedule with the Dodgers, who hired Ross Porter to cover for games that Scully couldn't call.

Scully also had his first of two stints calling baseball for CBS Radio during this period, broadcasting the All-Star Game from 1977 to 1982 (usually paired with Brent Musburger) and the World Series from 1979 to 1982 (alongside Sparky Anderson).

==== Departure from CBS ====
According to CBS Sports producer Terry O'Neil in the book The Game Behind the Game, Scully decided to leave CBS in favor of a job calling baseball games for NBC (beginning in 1983) following a dispute over assignment prominence. CBS decided going into the 1981 NFL season that John Madden, whom CBS had hired in 1979 and who had called games alongside Frank Glieber and Gary Bender his first two years, was going to be the star color commentator of their NFL television coverage. But they had trouble figuring out who was going to be his play-by-play partner, since Scully was in a battle with CBS' lead play-by-play announcer Pat Summerall for the position. At the time Scully was the number two announcer for CBS, a position he had held since 1975, and was calling games alongside the former Kansas City Chiefs head coach Hank Stram, who had been promoted from CBS' number three broadcast team alongside Curt Gowdy.

To resolve the situation, both Scully and Summerall were paired with Madden in four-week stretches, which coincided with each of their respective absences due to other engagements. While Summerall was away calling the US Open tennis tournament for CBS as he did every September, Scully called the first four weeks of the season alongside Madden. After that Scully went on to cover the National League Championship Series and World Series for CBS Radio, as he had done for the past few Octobers, and Summerall returned to the broadcast booth to work with Madden. Scully then teamed with Stram for the remainder of the NFL season.

After the eighth week of the NFL season, CBS Sports decided that Summerall meshed more with Madden than Scully did and it named him to be the announcer who would call Super Bowl XVI for CBS on January 24, 1982, at the Pontiac Silverdome. An angry Scully, who felt that his intelligence had been insulted by the move, was assigned as a consolation prize that year's NFC Championship Game, which he called alongside Stram. Summerall took Stram's place alongside Jack Buck to call the game over CBS Radio.

=== NBC Sports (1983–1989) ===
Scully in 1985

Outside of Southern California, Vin Scully is best remembered for his stint as NBC Sports' lead play-by-play announcer for its Major League Baseball coverage from 1983 to 1989. In addition to working Saturday Game of the Week telecasts for NBC, Scully called three World Series (1984, 1986, and 1988), four National League Championship Series (1983, 1985, 1987, and 1989), and four All-Star Games (1983, 1985, 1987, and 1989). Scully also reworked his Dodgers schedule during this period, broadcasting the team's home games on radio and road games on television, with Fridays and Saturdays off so he could work for NBC. During his stint at NBC, Scully provided the call for one of baseball's most memorable plays when Bill Buckner made a tenth-inning error in Game 6 of the 1986 World Series against the New York Mets. Scully also called Kirk Gibson's famous home run during Game 1 of the 1988 World Series.

Teaming with Joe Garagiola (who was the full-time lead play-by-play man for NBC's baseball telecasts from 1976 to 1982 before converting into a color commentary role to work with Scully) for NBC telecasts (except in 1989, when he was paired with Tom Seaver after Garagiola left NBC Sports following the 1988 World Series due to a contract dispute), the pair were on hand for several key moments in baseball history: Fred Lynn hitting the first grand slam in All-Star Game history (1983); the 1984 Detroit Tigers winning the World Series (along the way, he called Tigers pitcher Jack Morris' no-hitter against the Chicago White Sox on April 7); Ozzie Smith's game-winning home run in Game 5 of the 1985 National League Championship Series; the New York Mets' miracle rally in Game 6 of the 1986 World Series; the 1987 All-Star Game in Oakland, which was deadlocked at 0–0 before Tim Raines broke up the scoreless tie with a triple in the top of the 13th inning; the first official night game in the history of Chicago's Wrigley Field (August 9, 1988); Kirk Gibson's game-winning home run in Game 1 of the 1988 World Series; and chatting with former President of the United States Ronald Reagan (who said to Scully, "I've been out of work for six months and maybe there's a future here.") in the booth during the 1989 All-Star Game in Anaheim as Bo Jackson hit a lead-off home run.

On Saturday, June 3, 1989, Scully was doing the play-by-play for the NBC Game of the Week in St. Louis, where the Cardinals beat the Chicago Cubs in 10 innings. Meanwhile, the Dodgers were playing a series in Houston, where Scully flew to be on hand to call the Sunday game of the series. However, the Saturday night game between the teams was going into extra innings when Scully arrived in town, so he went to the Astrodome instead of his hotel. He picked up the play-by-play, helping to relieve the other Dodger announcers, who were doing both television and radio, and broadcast the final 13 innings (after already calling 10 innings in St. Louis), as the game went 22 innings. He broadcast 23 innings in one day in two different cities.

Laryngitis prevented Scully from calling Game 2 of the 1989 National League Championship Series between the San Francisco Giants and Chicago Cubs. Bob Costas, who was working the American League Championship Series between Oakland and Toronto with Tony Kubek for NBC, was flown from Toronto to Chicago to fill in that evening (an off day for the ALCS). After the 1989 season, NBC (along with ABC, with whom NBC had shared baseball coverage since 1976), lost the television rights to cover Major League Baseball to CBS. For the first time since 1946, NBC did not televise baseball. In the aftermath, Scully said of NBC losing baseball, "It's a passing of a great American tradition. It is sad. I really and truly feel that. It will leave a vast window, to use a Washington word, where people will not get Major League Baseball and I think that's a tragedy."

Scully also served as an announcer for NBC's golf coverage from 1983 to 1990, usually teaming with Lee Trevino.

=== After NBC (1990–2016) ===
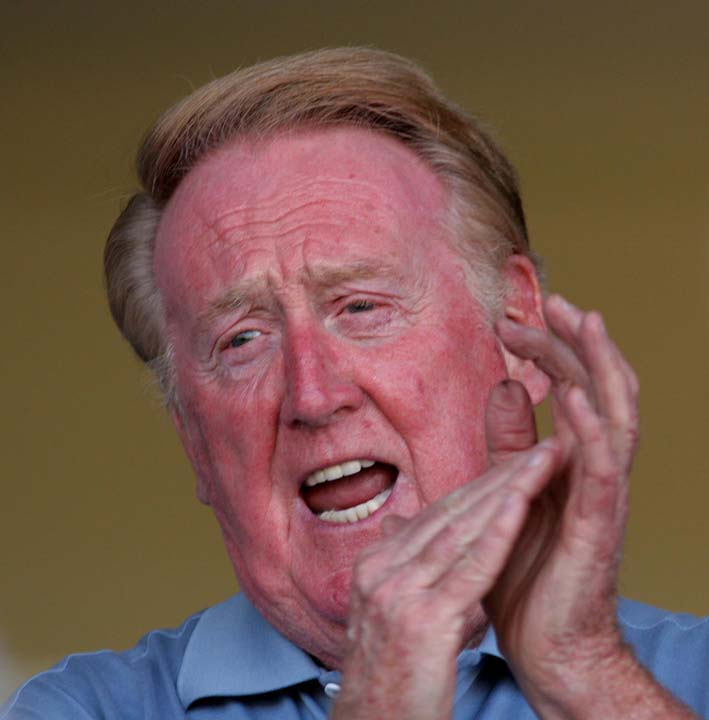
Scully in 2008

After the National League Championship Series in 1989, Scully's NBC contract was up and he left to focus primarily on his duties with the Dodgers. Scully also returned to being the national radio announcer for the World Series, since CBS Radio gave him the position that Jack Buck had vacated in order to become the primary announcer for CBS's television coverage of Major League Baseball. Scully worked the event from 1990 through 1997, teaming with Johnny Bench for the first four years and Jeff Torborg for the final three. After ESPN Radio acquired the World Series radio rights from CBS in 1998, Scully was offered a continued play-by-play role but declined. The final World Series game that Scully called was Game 7 of the 1997 World Series between the Florida Marlins and Cleveland Indians.

From 1991 to 1996, Scully broadcast the annual golf Skins Game for ABC. He also called the Senior Skins Game for ABC from 1992 to 2000, as well as various golf events for TBS during this period. In 1999, Scully was the master of ceremonies for Major League Baseball All-Century Team before the start of Game 2 of the World Series.

For health reasons, Scully no longer called most non-playoff games played east of Denver beginning around 2005. He missed most of the Dodgers' opening homestand of the 2012 MLB season (the first five out of six games) because of an illness, returning to the announcers' booth on April 15, 2012, which was the 65th anniversary of Jackie Robinson's breaking of the color barrier in baseball. It was only the second time that Scully had missed a Dodger Stadium home opener in his career with the team; the first time was when he was busy broadcasting the Masters golf tournament for CBS in 1977.

By his final season in 2016, Scully called approximately 100 games per season (all home games and select road games in San Francisco, San Diego, and Anaheim) for both flagship radio station KLAC and television outlet SportsNet LA. Scully was simulcast for the first three innings of each of his appearances, then announced the remaining innings only for the television audience. If Scully was calling the game, Charley Steiner took over play-by-play on radio beginning with the fourth inning, with Rick Monday as color commentator. If Scully was not calling the game, either Joe Davis or Steiner would call the entire game on television with Orel Hershiser and Nomar Garciaparra on color commentary, while Monday, now doing play-play, joined Kevin Kennedy on radio.

=== Retirement ===
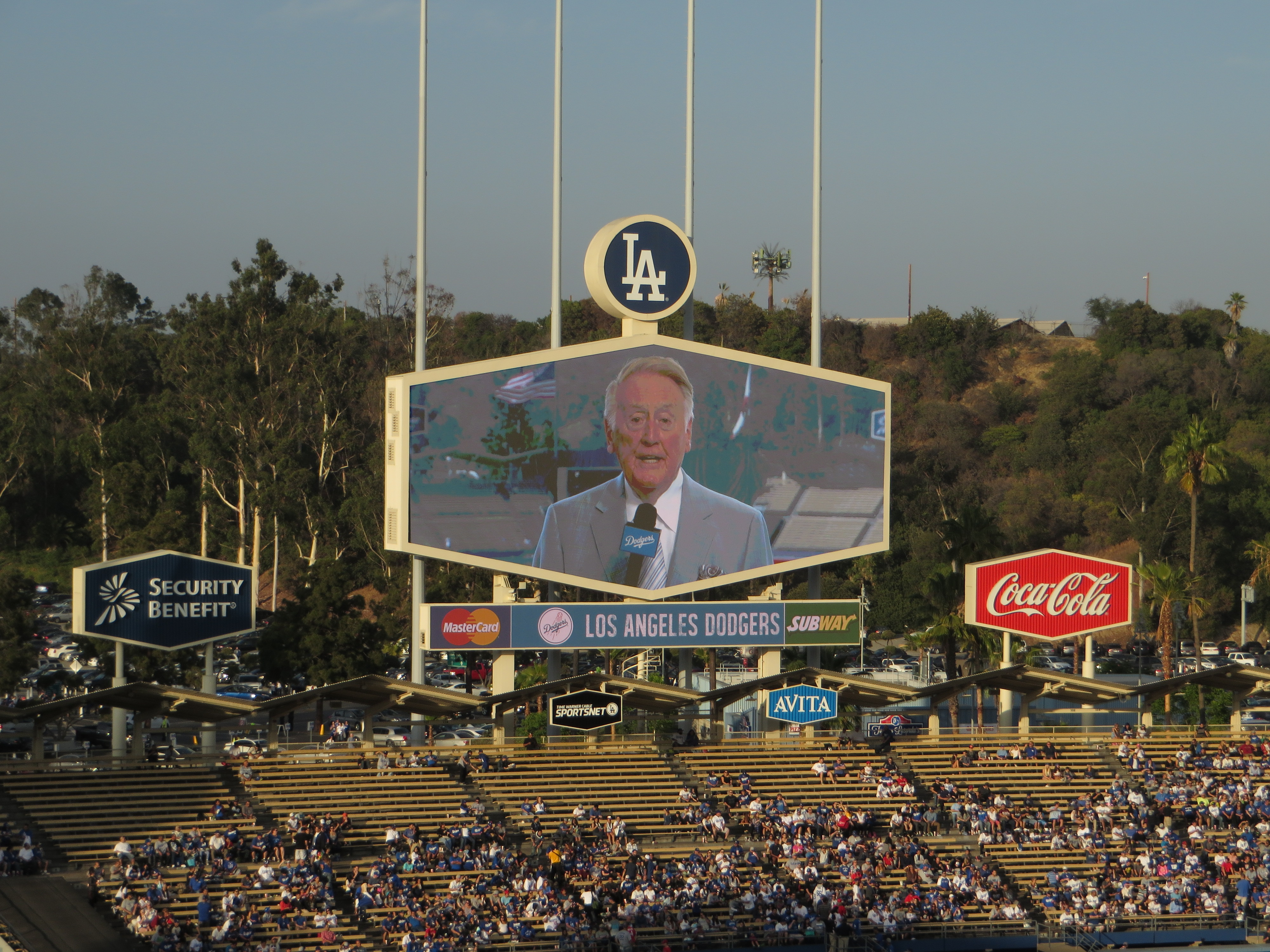
Vin Scully on the scoreboard of Dodger Stadium in 2014

On January 31, 2016, Scully announced that he planned to retire from broadcasting after the conclusion of the 2016 season; his final game was the team's October 2 finale at San Francisco. Scully left open the possibility of calling postseason games (but not the World Series) if the Dodgers were to advance; in September, however, Scully stated that he would retire after the end of the regular season and not call postseason games because he did not want to "say goodbye 12 different times". Scully was assigned a total of six road games for the 2016 season: the opening game in San Diego, two games in Anaheim, and the entirety of the three-game regular-season closing series in San Francisco.

Scully was honored by the Dodgers during their September 23 home game against the Rockies, which featured a pre-game ceremony that paid tribute to his career. The ceremony included speeches by Commissioner of Baseball Rob Manfred, Sandy Koufax, Clayton Kershaw, Mayor Eric Garcetti, the team's Spanish play-by-play man Jaime Jarrín (who took over Scully's distinction as the longest-tenured broadcaster in 2017), Kevin Costner, and Scully himself. The team also revealed that Kirk Gibson's 1988 World Series home run had been named the most memorable Vin Scully call in a fan vote.

His final home game was on September 25, 2016, against the visiting Colorado Rockies. The Dodgers ended up winning on a 10th inning walk-off home run by Charlie Culberson and in doing so clinched the NL West Division title. The final broadcast of his career was the Dodgers' October 2 game at AT&T Park against the San Francisco Giants. Scully's commentary during his final game was simulcast in its entirety on radio, instead of only the first three innings. After the game, he offered a prayer and a final message:

You and I have been friends for a long time, but I know in my heart that I've always needed you more than you've ever needed me, and I'll miss our time together more than I can say. But you know what? There will be a new day and eventually a new year. And when the upcoming winter gives way to spring, rest assured, once again it will be "time for Dodger baseball." So this is Vin Scully wishing you a very pleasant good afternoon, wherever you may be.

The following season, the Dodgers advanced to the World Series for the first time in 29 years. Despite many Dodgers fans petitioning Scully to come out of retirement, including Fox Sports announcer Joe Buck (who was quoted as saying, "I swear on my late father, to have Vin come do some of the series with us and in my place would be an honor"), Scully declined, preferring to keep a low profile and responding that "I've done enough of them." Scully did, however, take part in the first pitch ceremony prior to Game 2 with Steve Yeager and Fernando Valenzuela, teammates on the Dodgers team that won the 1981 World Series.

In 2020, he was auctioning sports memorabilia in part to donate to neuromuscular research. After the Dodgers World Series win in 2020, it was announced that Scully would narrate the team's year-end championship documentary.

=== Other appearances ===
In 1970, ABC Sports producer Roone Arledge tried to lure Scully to his network to call play-by-play for the then-new Monday Night Football games, but Scully's commitment to the Dodgers forced him to reject the offer.

Besides his sportscasting work, Scully was the uncredited narrator for the short-lived NBC sitcom Occasional Wife. Scully also co-hosted the Tournament of Roses Parade with Elizabeth Montgomery for ABC in 1967, served as the host for the NBC game show It Takes Two in 1969–70, and in 1973 hosted The Vin Scully Show, a weekday afternoon talk-variety show on CBS. In 1977, he hosted the prime-time Challenge of the Sexes for CBS.

Scully was the announcer in the popular Sony PlayStation-exclusive MLB video game series by 989 Sports for a number of years. Scully retired from announcing for video games after MLB 2005. Matt Vasgersian, Eric Karros, and Steve Lyons (and formerly Dave Campbell and Rex Hudler) took over as the lead announcers in the video game series, which was retitled MLB: The Show. Scully appears as himself in the 1999 film For Love of the Game, has a brief cameo (along with then-Dodgers partner Jerry Doggett) in the 1961 film Bachelor in Paradise, appears as a CBS news reporter in the 1960 film Wake Me When It's Over, provides the opening narration in the 1966 film Fireball 500, and can be heard calling baseball games in the films Experiment in Terror (1962), Zebra in the Kitchen (1965), The Party (1968), Fever Pitch (2005), The Bucket List (2007), and Licorice Pizza (2021), as well as in episodes of television series including General Electric Theater, Alcoa Premiere, Mister Ed, The Joey Bishop Show, The Fugitive, Highway to Heaven, and Brooklyn Bridge. The surname of the Dana Scully character on the television show The X-Files is an homage to Vin Scully, as the show's creator Chris Carter is a Dodgers fan; Scully himself can be heard calling a game in the Season 6 episode "The Unnatural".

In 1965, Scully recorded two spoken word songs as part of the album The Sound of the Dodgers: "What Is A Dodger?" and "The Story Of The L. A. Dodgers".

==== Impersonators ====
Harry Shearer impersonated Scully in a sketch for Saturday Night Live, and has used the voice for The Simpsons when the storyline includes the fictional Springfield Isotopes minor league baseball team.

San Francisco Giants broadcaster Jon Miller is known for his impersonation of Scully.

=== Awards and honors ===
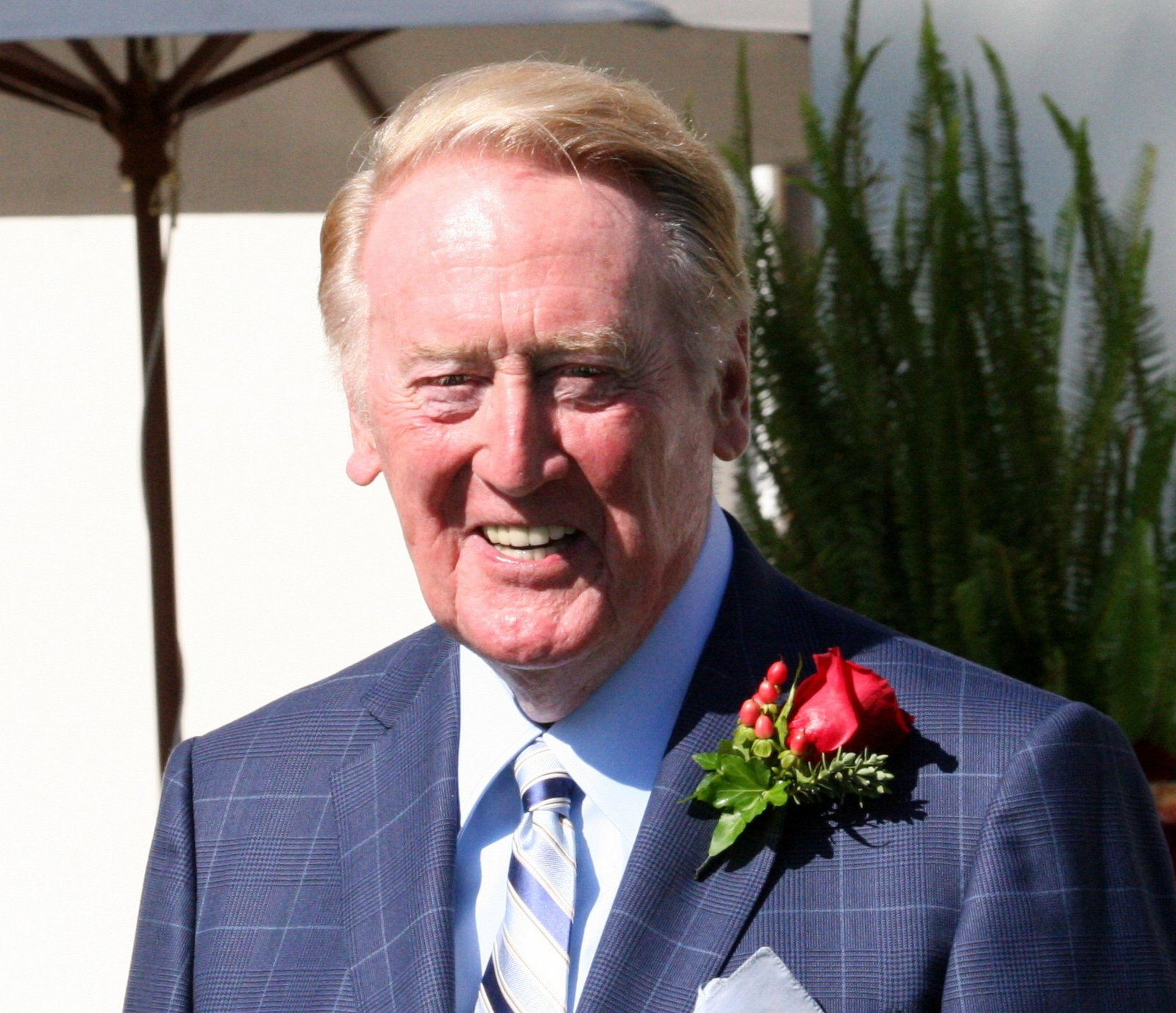
Scully as the grand marshal of the 2014 Rose Parade

Scully received the Ford Frick Award from the National Baseball Hall of Fame in 1982. He was honored with a Lifetime Achievement Emmy Award for sportscasting, and was inducted into the National Radio Hall of Fame in 1995. The National Sports Media Association (formerly the National Sportscasters and Sportswriters Association) named Scully as National Sportscaster of the Year four times (1965, 1978, 1982, 2016) and California Sportscaster of the Year 33 times, and inducted him into its Hall of Fame in 1991. He was the 1992 Hall of Fame inductee of the American Sportscasters Association, which also named him Sportscaster of the Century (2000) and top sportscaster of all-time on its Top 50 list (2009). The California Sports Hall of Fame inducted Scully in 2008. Scully was inducted into the NAB Broadcasting Hall of Fame in 2009. On May 11, 2009, he was awarded the Ambassador Award of Excellence by the LA Sports & Entertainment Commission.

On an episode of MLB Network's series Prime 9, about the nine greatest baseball broadcasters of all time, Scully was named No. 1.

Scully has a star on the Hollywood Walk of Fame at 6675 Hollywood Blvd. Since 2001, the press box at Dodger Stadium has been named for Scully, and a street within the team's former Dodgertown spring training facility in Vero Beach, Florida was named "Vin Scully Way".

WFUV, the Fordham University radio station that Scully helped found, presents an annual Vin Scully Lifetime Achievement Award for sports broadcasting. Scully himself was the inaugural recipient of the award in 2008.

Scully served as the grand marshal for the 2014 Tournament of Roses Parade. Also, he participated aboard the Los Angeles Dodgers' 50th anniversary float in the 2008 Tournament of Roses Parade.

On September 5, 2014, Bud Selig presented Scully with the Commissioner's Historic Achievement Award. He was the 14th recipient and (after Rachel Robinson) second non-player to receive the award, which was created to recognize accomplishments and contributions of historical significance to the game of baseball.

Several honors were bestowed in 2016, Scully's final year. On January 29, the Los Angeles City Council voted unanimously to rename Elysian Park Avenue, which changed the address of Dodger Stadium to 1000 Vin Scully Ave. July 8 was dubbed "Vin Scully Day" by the acting governor of California, Kevin de León. During the pre-game ceremony on September 23, 2016, Los Angeles Mayor Eric Garcetti presented Vin Scully with the key to the city. On November 22, Scully received the Presidential Medal of Freedom, the highest civilian honor given by the President of the United States.

In 2017, Scully's commentary for the final Brooklyn Dodgers/New York Giants game in 1957 was selected for preservation in the National Recording Registry by the Library of Congress as being "culturally, historically, or aesthetically significant". Also in 2017, Scully won the Icon Award as part of that year's ESPY Awards ceremony.

At Game 2 of the 2017 World Series, being played at Dodger Stadium, Scully participated in a pre-game ceremony; addressing the crowd over the PA system, he implied that he was about to throw the ceremonial first pitch, and introduced Steve Yeager to serve as a ceremonial catcher. However, Scully then claimed that he could not actually pitch because he had hurt his rotator cuff, resulting in him introducing the actual ceremonial pitcher, Fernando Valenzuela. Scully also uttered his famous introduction, "It's time for Dodger baseball!"

== Personal life ==
In 1972, Scully's 35-year-old wife Joan Crawford died of an accidental medical overdose; the couple had been married for 15 years. In late 1973, he married Sandra Hunt, who had two children of her own, and they soon had a child together. Scully's eldest son, Michael, died in a helicopter crash at the age of 33 while working for the ARCO Transportation Company. He was inspecting oil pipelines for leaks near Fort Tejon, California, in the immediate aftermath of the 1994 Northridge earthquake.

Although Michael's death still haunted him, Scully, a devout Roman Catholic, said in numerous interviews that he credited his religious faith and being able to dive back into his work with helping him ease the burden and grief from losing his wife and son. He encouraged devotion to the Virgin Mary, saying, "Her prayers are more powerful than those of the rest of heaven combined. No one was closer or more devoted to Christ on earth, so it only makes sense to see the same thing in heaven. Now, the Blessed Virgin seeks to help her spiritual children get home to spend eternity with her Son." In 2016, Scully narrated an audio recording of the Rosary for Catholic Athletes for Christ in which he recites the Rosary mysteries and leads a group of responders. He also narrated some pieces for the Knights of Columbus on SiriusXM's The Catholic Channel.

In November 2017, Scully stated that he would "never watch another NFL game again," due to some of the league's players kneeling during the playing of the national anthem prior to games.

Scully had four children, two stepchildren, twenty-one grandchildren, and six great-grandchildren. He resided in Hidden Hills, California, and attended St. Jude the Apostle Church in Westlake Village, California. He was a second cousin of the former Lord Mayor of Dublin, Mary Freehill.

Scully and his second wife Sandra were married for 48 years until Sandra's death from amyotrophic lateral sclerosis on January 3, 2021.

=== Death ===
On August 2, 2022, Scully died at home in Hidden Hills, California, at age 94. His funeral was held at St. Jude the Apostle Roman Catholic Church, in Westlake Village, California, on August 8.

Upon his death, Rob Manfred, the Commissioner of Baseball, released a statement:

Today, we mourn the loss of a legend in our game. Vin was an extraordinary man whose gift for broadcasting brought joy to generations of Dodger fans. In addition, his voice played a memorable role in some of the greatest moments in the history of our sport. I am proud that Vin was synonymous with baseball because he embodied the very best of our National Pastime. As great as he was as a broadcaster, he was equally great as a person. On behalf of Major League Baseball, I extend my deepest condolences to Vin's family, friends, Dodger fans and his admirers everywhere.

The Dodgers had just beaten the San Francisco Giants at Oracle Park when Scully's death was announced by public address announcer Renel Brooks-Moon. The Giants, who had been Scully's favorite team growing up, paid tribute to Scully on their video board while the Dodgers team gathered on the field.

Afterwards, Dodgers fans left tributes to Scully at the entrance of Dodger Stadium where the address bore his name. Broadcasters, sports teams, politicians, and athletes paid tribute to Scully as well.

On August 6, the Dodgers held a pre-game ceremony during which a tribute video was played and photo montage was shown. Outside the television booth, from where Scully broadcast games, hung a banner saying "We'll miss you". Manager Dave Roberts ended the pre-game ceremony with Scully's iconic catch phrase: "It's time for Dodger baseball!"

Media offices
Preceded by Joe Garagiola and Dick Enberg	World Series network television play-by-play announcer 1983–1989 (concurrent with ABC's Al Michaels in even numbered years); Additionally, Scully also called seven World Series as a representative of the Dodgers, and not as a network employee, in the 1950s–1970s.	Succeeded by Jack Buck
Preceded by Bill White and Ross Porter; Jack Buck	World Series national radio play-by-play announcer 1979–1982; 1990–1997	Succeeded by Jack Buck; Jon Miller
Preceded by Joe Garagiola and Dick Enberg	Lead play-by-play announcer, Major League Baseball on NBC; 1983–1989	Succeeded by Bob Costas (in 1994)
Preceded by Joe Garagiola and Dick Enberg	Lead Major League Baseball Game of the Week play-by-play announcer 1983–1989	Succeeded by Jack Buck
