= List of The Catholic Guy recurring segments =

This is an incomplete list of recurring segments featured on The Catholic Guy. The Catholic Guy Show is a radio talk show.

== Current segments ==
=== Discussion segments ===
The following segments feature discussion on a specific topic where callers can interject their opinions:

==== Ask Lino Anything ====
A derivative of previous question segments, listeners may ask Lino any question they have. Questions vary from those related to Catholic theology to personal questions about Lino's life.

==== The Eleventh Commandment ====
Not satisfied with just Ten Commandments, Lino or a co-hosts adds one of their own for real-life situations and explains their rationale.

==== Minor Confessions ====
Listeners call in with things that they have done that aren't truly sins and can't be brought to the Confessional, but are still things that they're not exactly proud of having done.

==== Not Counting My Blessings ====
The day's co-host and callers pose multiple questions as Lino tried to find the negative attributes in them.

==== Random Thankfulness ====
Listeners call in and describe the things for which they are randomly thankful. Lino encourages folks to not describe "obvious" things to be thankful for (e.g. God, food, good health), but rather the strange things in our daily lives (e.g. bad commercials, falling trees, warm beer).

==== Things That Drive You Crazy At Mass ====
Listeners call in and discuss things they have seen happen at Mass that bother them.

=== Games ===
The following segments are games in which callers can win prizes:

==== Answer The Question ====
Callers answer Lino's questions relating to both the Church and pop culture. For example, are there more sacraments in the Catholic Church or number of seasons of Walker, Texas Ranger. Each contestant gets five tries, with the prize determined by the number of correct answers given (more correct answers = better prize).

==== Ask and You Shall Receive ====
Lino gives listeners the opportunity to receive anything they want (within reason), acting in the way God answers prayers easily. The listeners can ask for prizes normally given to game winners (such as a rosary or Lino's books), or they can ask for many other things (such as a tour of the studio).

==== Don't Be Greedy ====
Lino asks callers a series of questions, one each harder than the other. If they get one right, they win a prize. They can either choose to keep the prize, or forfeit it, being greedy and trying for a better prize with a harder question.

==== Catholic Password ====
Based on the TV game show Password, two callers are given a Catholic-themed password, then took turns giving one-word clues in an attempt to have Lino guess the password. If he guesses it on the first clue, the person whose clue it is received ten points... the second clue, nine points, and so on until the password was guessed or ten clues are given out. The caller with the most points earns a prize. In earlier versions of the game, Lou and Maureen would compete against each other in seven rounds, with the winner receiving bragging rights until the next time the game was played. Father Rob would also guess passwords in the game prior to his departure.

==== God's Honest Truth ====
Lino gives callers a Catholic-related statement, and the caller must determine if the statement is a lie or the God's Honest Truth. Each contestant got five tries, with the prize determined by the number of correct answers given.

==== The Retention Game ====
Usually played after a "Catholic Guy Pilgrimage", Lino plays an audio clip of a pilgrim being asked questions about what they learned on the pilgrimage. Callers do not have to know the answers to the questions, they just have to guess if the pilgrim interviewed will answer the question correctly or not.

==== Bible or Fortune Cookie ====
First featured on Lino at Large, this segment has callers hearing a verse or short sentence or two and they need to identify whether it is from the bible or a fortune cookie. In 2017, an additional source was added to the game: Mark Hart quotes. Contestants must guess if the quote is from the bible, a fortune cookie, or a quote from Mark Hart.

=== In-studio segments ===
The following segments are between those in-studio only and do not include caller interaction:

==== Boring / Traditional Catholic Radio ====
Hearkening back to the good ol' days of "Traditional" Catholic radio, Lino transforms the show into a plodding, glitch-laden, mind-numbing mess to give listeners a taste of what boring Catholic radio sounds like.

==== Celebrate, Contemplate, Not That Great ====
Tyler names three people or events within a category (such as three Apostles or three holy days of obligation). Lino and his co-host must decide which option they will celebrate, which they will contemplate, and which one is "not that great".

==== Hot, Rich, or Pious ====
Tyler reads a hypothetical scenario involving an unnamed person. Lino and his co-host for the day must decide if they prefer the unnamed person to be hot, rich, or pious.

This segment had not been featured since October 2011 until its 2016 periodic return.

==== Lino's Confirmation Sponsor-ee ====
Lino is asked by a young confirmation student to be their sponsor. The "sponsor-ee" calls in to discuss what they learned in class that week, followed by commentary and advice.

==== Lino's General Audience ====
A takeoff of the General Audience the Pope holds every Wednesday, Lino pontificates on a specific theme of his choosing (after reading the pope's message in Pope Benedict XVI's German accent).

==== Saint Who?!?! ====
Tyler names a saint (almost always an obscure one). Lino and his co-host discusses said saint, completely making up the saint's history for humorous effect. When they are finished, Tyler reveals the real history of the Saint.

==== Scathergories ====
Based (loosely) on the party game Scattergories, this game is played in three rounds. Lino selected a letter of the alphabet, then gives playing crewmembers (including himself) 60 seconds to write down words/phrases starting with that letter that describe eight Catholic categories (e.g., a place in the New Testament that begins with the letter 'C'). The answers are then hotly debated amongst the contestants, with one point awarded for each answer deemed acceptable by the majority of players. Extra points are given for alliterative answers, and points are not awarded if a contestant begins their answer with the same word as another contestant's.

This segment was regular feature until September 2011, but had a hiatus due to a lack of on-air crewmembers to play the game. It made a brief return in April 2014 when Father Jim Chern and former producer Lou Ruggieri were guests on the show, and was added back to a periodic rotation in 2016.

==== Song of Songs ====
Named for the Old Testament book, two crewmembers describe elements of a biblical story with popular songs. The other crewmember decides which song better represents each part of the story.

==== This Or That ====
Producer Tyler reads hypothetical situations to Lino and gives him two courses of action that he could take. He and cohost then rationalize and argue about their choices.

==== What's on Tyler's Mind ====
Producer Tyler provides a random question or commentary for Lino to discuss. Spinoffs of the segment include "What's on Lino's Heart", "What's on Mark Hart's Heart", and "What's on a Listener's Mind", along with the former "What's Behind Father Jim's Dumb Glasses", which ended after Father Jim's departure from the show.

==== Who's Your Daddy/Mamma? ====
Lino asks callers a series of five questions about fathers or mothers of all kinds from the Bible, and each listener needed to get at least 2-of-3 correct to win a prize.

=== Song Parodies ===
Throughout the years, Lino and crew often sings song parodies, most of which are either of religious significance or about other crew members.

==== Lenten parodies ====
During Lent 2012, Lino proclaimed his act of penance as being he and Father Rob doing a song parody (nearly) each day. The altered title is followed by the original in parentheses:

- "All Lent Long (All Lent)" – ("All Night Long (All Night)")
- "The Power of Lent" – ("The Power of Love")
- "Lenten Train" – ("Crazy Train")
- "Fast Like Lino" – ("Moves Like Jagger")
- "Nothin' but a Good Lent" – ("Nothin' but a Good Time")
- "Enter Lent" – ("Enter Sandman")
- "Let's Talk About Lent" – ("Let's Talk About Sex")
- "Lent is a Bear" – ("Livin' on a Prayer")
- "Father Rob (and Lino Rulli)" – ("The 59th Street Bridge Song (Feelin' Groovy)")
- "It's the End of Lent as We Know It (And We Feel Fine) – ("It's the End of the World as We Know It (And I Feel Fine)")

Lenten song parodies returned for Lent 2013:

- "All Lent Long (All Lent)" – ("All Night Long (All Night)")
- "Always Gonna Give Stuff Up" – ("Never Gonna Give You Up")
- "Help!" – ("Help!")
- "Drinking in the Dark" – ("Dancing in the Dark")
- "Praying for 40 Days" – ("Working for the Weekend")
- "Nothin' but God's Grace" – ("Nothin' but a Good Time")
- "(I'm Not) A Badger" – ("(Don't Fear) The Reaper")

Lino and Father Rob sang "All Lent Long (All Lent)" for a final time in 2014 before Father Rob's departure from the show. After a two-year hiatus, Lino and producer Tyler revived Lenten song parodies in 2017:

- "We're Not Gonna Eat Meat" – ("We're Not Gonna Take It")
- "Lenten Penance Blues" – ("Folsom Prison Blues")
- "Purple" – ("Yellow")
- "Catholic Man" – ("Rocket Man")
- "Holding Out for a Penance" – ("Holding Out for a Hero")
- "Bad Lent" – ("Bad Day")
- "When You Close Your Eyes (Do You Dream About Meat?)" – ("When You Close Your Eyes (Do You Dream About Me?)")
- "Now Lent's Done (It's Done)" – ("All Night Long (All Night)")

In 2018, Lenten song parodies returned:

- "Put Some Ashes on Me" – ("Pour Some Sugar on Me")
- "Read It" – ("Beat It")
- "We're Not Gonna Eat Meat" – ("We're Not Gonna Take It")

2019:

- "Don’t Eat Meat On Fridays" – ("We Didn't Start the Fire")
- "Never Gonna Eat You Up" – ("Never Gonna Give You Up")
- "Can I Eat Meat Now?" – ("Who Can It Be Now?")

2020:

- "Baby Got Ash" – ("Baby Got Back")
- "No Meat Tonight" – ("December, 1963 (Oh, What a Night)")

Due to the 2020 coronavirus pandemic, normal Lenten song parodies were put on hold. The crew then produced Lenten quarantine song parodies:

- "Quarantine Time" – ("Closing Time")
- "Quarantine" – ("Dancing Queen")

== Former segments ==
The following segments were featured on the show until its format change in 2013.

=== Discussion segments ===
==== Catholic Guy Advice ====
Listeners emailed Lino about difficult situations that they have found themselves in, and Lino and Father Rob advised them on how to deal with the situation. Lino then opened up the phone lines for listeners to give their take.

==== Father Rob's Righteous Anger ====
Formerly called "Father Rob is Full of Vice", Father Rob told of recent happenings in his life and interactions with people that have really gotten him steamed. Lino and the listeners debated if his anger was "righteous" or not.

==== Lino's Casting Couch ====
Lino took a story from the Bible, and then asked listeners to cast modern-day actors and actresses in the roles of the main characters from that story, based on who they think would be the best fit.

==== Mysteries ====
Lino, Father Rob, and the listeners shared puzzling mysteries of day-to-day life, such as driving on a parkway and parking in a driveway or why a person "catches" a cold.

==== No Dumb Questions (only potentially dumb answers) ====
This segment was open forum for listeners to call in with their questions about the faith and the Catholic Church. Lino and/or Father Rob tried to answer the callers' questions, some of which were quite challenging.

=== Games ===
==== 19 Questions ====
Identical in concept to the traditional 20 Questions game, but with one less question just to make it a little different. The moderator had a Saint in mind, and Lino and Father Rob took turns asking "yes or no" questions about that Saint to narrow it down. The first person to guess correctly won points based on how many questions it took; a correct guess on the first question would earn 19 points, with one point subtracted for each additional question asked.

==== Do You Watch More TV Than A Parish Priest? ====
Callers went against Father Rob in this game featuring TV theme songs. The listener was played clips from five theme songs while Father Rob waited outside the studio, and must identify as many as possible. Then Father Rob came back and was played the same five themes. If a listener identified more (or the same number of) TV themes than Father Rob, they won a prize of their choosing. If Father Rob identifies more, he got to spend a minute or so mocking the listener in whatever way he sees fit.

==== Higher/Lower ====
Based on The Clock Game from The Price Is Right, Lino asked callers a question with a numerical answer, and the caller had 30 seconds to answer correctly, with Father Rob helping the listener by telling them if their answer needs to be higher or lower than their last answer. Each listener needed to get at least 2-of-3 right to win.

==== Let's Make a Catholic Deal ====
Inspired by the show Let's Make a Deal, callers are asked a question about Catholicism or the Bible. If they get the answer correct, they win a semi-valuable prize. The caller can take the prize or forfeit it to possibly win a better prize behind doors 1, 2, or 3. One door will contain a premium prize, such as a Pope bottle opener or rosary. The remaining doors may contain prizes ranging from postcards to random sound effects, being hung up on, or various junk lying around the studio.

==== What Does an Atheist Know? ====
In a similar format to "The Retention Game", Lino plays clips of his Atheist friend Jim being asked basic questions about Catholicism (or Christianity in general). Callers guessed if Jim answered them correctly or not.

==== What's Father Rob Humming? ====
Similar in concept to What's Lino Whistling (see below), Father Rob stuck his iPod headphones in his ears and hummed along to the song that's playing... although it is not so much humming as it is vaguely harmonized grunting. Listeners called in and guessed what song Father Rob is humming. If they guessed correctly, they had the opportunity to win a variety of prizes from the show based on the song's difficulty.

==== What's Lino Whistling? ====
Per Lino's admission, he cannot whistle. In this segment, Lino attempted to whistle a tune, which is usually less of a whistle and more of the release of air through what sounded like missing teeth. Listeners called in and guessed what song Lino is whistling. If they guessed correctly, they have the opportunity to win a variety of prizes from the show based on the song's difficulty.

==== Where Am I? ====
Lino asked questions of which the answer will be a saint's name that is also the name of a city; callers would guess the name of the city to win a prize. For example, the patron saint of lost things (Anthony of Padua / San Antonio).

==== Who Did It? ====
Lino and Father Rob both recited statements of sins one of the two had previously committed (ex. "I committed the sin of wrath by throwing a carrot at a friend"). Callers would determine if Lino or Father Rob actually did what they said. They had to get at least two correct to win a prize.

==== Word of God or Word of Man? ====
Lino read statements and callers would decide if they come from the bible or a random person. Each caller got three statements and had to answer at least one correctly to win a prize.

=== In-studio segments ===
==== Free Therapy Tuesday ====
Lino discussed his latest counseling sessions with his therapist. He brought up his questions and challenges in the hopes that listeners learn something.

==== Homily On The Spot ====
A segment first featured in 2011, it first began with an effort to test Father Rob's homiletics skills. Lino would read a random passage from the bible, and Father Rob had to formulate and deliver a brief homily based on that Scripture passage while dealing with constant interruptions from Lino. At the end of the homily, Lino gave it a letter grade.

In 2016, the segment made a return, although the premise was slightly changed. On Fridays, Lino read the bible readings for the upcoming Sunday Mass. Father Jim Chern would then deliver a homily based on the upcoming readings.

==== Interviews With The Saints ====
Lino paid a visit to "heaven" and conducts "interviews" with various Saints... all of whom mysteriously sound a lot like Father Rob.

==== The Li-Nie Awards ====
An Emmy Award-like segment that showcased the "best of the worst" of the commercials that air on The Catholic Channel. Commercials were nominated in various categories ('Worst production values', 'Longest unnecessary pause', etc.), and winners were declared by a majority vote amongst the participating crew members. The segment was previously known as The Gussie Awards, named after fellow Catholic Channel host Gus Lloyd; it was also temporarily called The Timmy Awards after Father Rob's nickname.

==== Lino's Confirmation Sponsor-ee ====
Lino was asked by a young confirmation student to be their sponsor. The "sponsor-ee" called in to discuss what they learned in class that week, followed by commentary and advice from Lino and Father Rob.

==== Lino's Favorite New Catholic ====
Listeners called in over several days to nominate someone who came into the Catholic Church during that year's Easter Vigil (either themselves or someone else) in the hopes of winning a package of prizes. Lino asked each nominee (or their nominator) a series of questions to determine who would make the short list of nominees, with a winner determined by Lino at the end of the week.

==== Lino Is Sorry (And So Is Father Rob) ====
Usually done on a Friday, Lino and Father Rob apologized for things they have said and done on the air that they wish they hadn't.

==== Lino's Music Makeover ====
Sirius XM music host Kayla Riley stopped by each week as the crew rates Christian/Catholic music. Each week four or five songs were chosen that fit a certain genre previously chosen by a listener (e.g., Catholic songs to listen to while commuting to work), and after listening to a clip from each song Kayla and the crew rated it on a scale of 0-5 "noses" (with 0 being the worst and 5 being the best). This segment began with the playing of southern gospel group The Lighthouse Boys' song "Jesus is a Friend of Mine" and often ended with the praise and worship song "Let It Rain", both played for humorous effect.

==== Mail Time ====
Lino read emails sent in by listeners.

==== Mystery Science Homilies ====
In this segment's first incarnation, Lino played a recording of an actual homily given by Father Rob at Mass the previous Sunday. He provided a running commentary on it in the style of Mystery Science Theater 3000, critiquing Father Rob's delivery and performance usually more than necessary.

When Father Jim Chern joined the show as permanent co-host in 2016, the segment made a return, this time using Father Jim's homily from the previous week. The only difference was the lack of an audio recording of the homily; rather, producer Tyler read the homily's text himself for critique by Lino and Mark Hart. Father Jim later allowed critique of the homily' actual audio. This segment ended after Father Jim's departure from the show.

==== Pope for a Day ====
In the same way Pope Francis randomly calls people who write him, Lino calls listeners who have previously emailed the show with their phones numbers and why he should call them on the air.

==== Seven Deadly Questions ====
Lino responded to seven previously-prepared questions about himself sent in by the listeners.

==== Tell Me Something I Didn't Know ====
In last incarnation of the show's daily news segment, Father Rob read summaries of a number of interesting news stories, and he and Lino commented on them. This segment was previously known as The World Beyond Lino, The Wheel of News, and Lou's News.

==== What's Up With That? ====
Lino read stories that are more unusual in nature, prompting Lino to ask the question "What's up with that?" (modeled from both an audio clip of Father Jim Chern and a Saturday Night Live sketch of a similar title). This segment ended after Father Jim's departure from the show.

=== Other former segments ===
==== Are You Smarter Than A Bad Catholic? ====
Former producer Maureen McMurray had a reputation of not knowing as much about Catholicism as she should, and attempted to prove it by going against listeners. With Maureen out of the studio, each listener was given a category (e.g., pilgrimage sites, books in the New Testament) and had to name as many items as they could that fell into that category. Maureen was then brought in to do the same. If a listener won, they would get a prize based on the level of difficulty assigned to that category by Lino and Lou/Ryan. If Maureen won, she would get a temporary reprieve from being labeled a "bad Catholic."

This segment ended when Maureen left the show in June 2011.

==== Hopefully not Catholic ====
People who committed dumb acts that made the news were commented on, with Lino and crew jokingly hoping said person was not Catholic due to Lino's desire that the Church not look bad (the crew did hope that the person repented.)

This segment has not aired since 2010.

==== The Inquizition ====
Every Friday, technical director Lou Ruggieri would match wits with professional phone answerer Tom Falcone to see which one of the two learned more about Catholicism over the past week.

This segment has not aired since Falcone left the show in 2008.

==== Name That Sinner ====
A simple quiz game where Lino gives callers clues about certain celebrities and the sins they've committed, and the listeners guess the celebrity for the chance to win a prize.

This segment was last featured in September 2011.

==== Who's More Catholic? ====
On Fridays, Lino and frequent Friday guest Father Jim Chern played this best-of-seven-rounds game in which a random sound effect was played during each round, and the two then had 30 seconds to write down the best Catholic connection to that sound effect. Callers were chosen to decide who made the better connection, often resulting in allegations by Lino that the audience was biased toward Father Jim because they wanted him to win at Lino's expense. Because of this, later versions of the game had the crew deciding who made a better connection, with the listeners relegated to breaking ties if the crew was split.

This segment used to air every Friday when Father Jim was a regular guest on the show. Due to the perception of bias (see description), this segment had not appeared since 2010 until its one-time revitalization in 2017.

==== Win Lou's Money! ====
Listeners went up against former assistant producer Lou Ruggieri to answer Catholic trivia. With Lou out of the studio, each listener was asked to answer seven Catholic trivia questions as fast as they could within 60 seconds, and then Lou was brought back in to do the same. If there was time left after the last question, Lou and the contestants could stop (hoping that a fast time would earn them victory) or go back and answer skipped questions (hoping that more correct answers would help them). If a listener had more correct answers than Lou, or had the same number of correct answers but finished faster, they won cold hard cash from Lou.

This segment ended when Lou left the show in April 2011. It made a return in April 2014 when Lou was a guest on the show.
