= Sinner (Rulli book) =

- First edition
- Author: Lino Rulli
- Language: English
- Genre: Catholicism
- Publisher: Servant Books
- Publication date: September 1, 2011
- Publication place: United States
- Pages: 181 (paperback)
- ISBN: 978-1-61636-039-9
- Followed by: Saint: Why I Should Be Canonized Right Away

Sinner: The Catholic Guy's Funny, Feeble Attempts to Be a Faithful Catholic is a book written by American Catholic radio host Lino Rulli, published in 2011. Rulli's sequel to Sinner, Saint: Why I Should Be Canonized Right Away, was released on September 3, 2013.

== Reception ==
Sinner was notably endorsed by Timothy M. Dolan (Cardinal Archbishop of New York) and Gary Dell'Abate (executive producer of The Howard Stern Show), representing its extremes of both piety and crudeness. In reflection of the book's Catholic theology with comedic undertone, author Rulli was interviewed by a variety of media facets, including CatholicTV, Fox News Channel, and Howard 100 News.
