= Lino at Large =

American talk radio show

- Genre: Talk, Religious
- Running time: 30 min.
- Country of origin: United States
- Starring: Lino Rulli
- Produced by: Lou Ruggieri; Matt Willkom
- Original release: 2004 – 2012
- Website: Lino at Large
- Podcast: Lino at Large Podcast

Lino at Large is a weekly radio talk show hosted by American media personality Lino Rulli that aired from 2004–2012. A podcast of the show was released weekly via iTunes. It also aired on The Catholic Channel on Sirius XM Satellite Radio and was syndicated throughout North America. Lino at Large featured comedic segments directed to young Catholic adults. The show was sponsored by the United States Conference of Catholic Bishops, specifically the Catholic Communication Campaign.

== See also ==
- The Catholic Guy
