= The Sound of the Dodgers =

1965 album on the Los Angeles Dodgers

- Album cover by Ed Thrasher

Studio album by Various artists
- Released: 1965
- Genre: Rock; pop; spoken word
- Label: Jaybar Records
- Producer: Jackie Barnett

The Sound of the Dodgers is a studio album recorded and released in 1965 by Jaybar Records and is a collection of songs about the Los Angeles Dodgers, a Major League Baseball team. The album is notable for including Dodger star shortstop Maury Wills and outfielder Willie Davis, as well as the team announcer Vin Scully. Also featured on the album were comedian Stubby Kaye and singer Jimmy Durante.

== Track listing ==
No.	Title	Writer(s)	Lead vocals	Length
1.	"Dodger Stadium"	Jackie Barnett	Maury Wills, Willie Davis and Stubby Kaye	2:21
2.	"Somebody's Keeping Score"	Jackie Barnett, Sammy Fain	Maury Wills	2:04
3.	"What Is a Dodger?"	Sidney Skolsky	Vin Scully	4:52
4.	"Soliloquoy of a Dodger Fan"	Jackie Barnett	Stubby Kaye	4:41
5.	"Dandy Sandy"	Jackie Barnett, Sammy Fain	Jimmy Durante	2:11
6.	"That's the Way the Ball Bounces"	Jackie Barnett, Sammy Fain	Willie Davis	2:37
7.	"The Story of the L.A. Dodgers"	Mel Durslag	Vin Scully	9:24
