= Saint (book) =

- Author: Lino Rulli
- Language: English
- Genre: Catholicism
- Publisher: Servant Books
- Publication date: September 3, 2013
- Publication place: United States
- ISBN: 978-1616366681
- Preceded by: Sinner: The Catholic Guy's Funny, Feeble Attempts to Be a Faithful Catholic

Saint: Why I Should Be Canonized Right Away is a book written by American Catholic radio host Lino Rulli. It was released on September 3, 2013 and is the sequel to Rulli's 2011 book, Sinner.
