= Georgia News Network =

Radio news service in Georgia, United States

- Company type: Statewide Radio News Service
- Industry: Media
- Headquarters: Atlanta, Georgia, United States
- Area served: Georgia, United States
- Services: Radio broadcasts
- Owner: iHeartMedia
- Website: www.georgianewsnetwork.com/main.html

The Georgia News Network or GNN is a news agency that provides newscasts, sportscasts, and talk programming for approximately 150 radio stations across the state of Georgia. GNN is owned by iHeartMedia.

== News output ==
The Georgia News Network provides newscasts, sportscasts and weather forecasts 7 days a week to affiliate stations across the state of Georgia. This includes 2-minute and 1-minute hourly newscasts each day. The network also broadcasts major breaking news events and provides special reports during elections. Affiliate stations receive content either via satellite feed, FTP download or the GNN OnDemand website. This site provides links to audio downloads, such as newscasts, commercials and PSA announcements and historic radio broadcasts.

Georgia Focus is a 28-minute, self-contained public affairs broadcast. John Clark hosts the show, which features a new topic every week. Issues covered range from health care to public safety, from non-profits to authors and state government. GNN also broadcasts high school football playoffs annually on the same channel.

=== Weather ===
GNN measures weather conditions in all of Georgia state every half-hour over a period of 24 hours. Warnings are provided to the public in the event that there is severe weather in the region, such as a tornado

== Former channels ==
- News Room-Flagship WGST
- Georgia Focus
- Dave Merlino Show
- Southern Race Week
- Sports Conversations with Loran Smith
- High School Football

== On-air personalities ==
- Matt McClure, executive producer and morning anchor
- Liz Kennedy, PM anchor
- John Clark, director and host of 'Georgia Focus'
- Mitch Evans, news & sports anchor/reporter
- Rebecca Hubbard, anchor/reporter
- Scott Kimbler, anchor/reporter
- Charley O'Brian, anchor/reporter
- Rocio Rivera, anchor/reporter
- Kathy White, anchor/reporter
- Mark Woolsey, anchor/reporter
- Tyrik Wynn, anchor/reporter
- Laura Huckabee, meteorologist
- Seth Everett, sports anchor
- Frank Garrity, sports anchor

Former on-air personalities

- Matt Cook, news director/morning anchor (retired)
- Doug Nodine, PM anchor (retired)
- Rob Stadler, PM anchor (now with the Impact Partnership)
- John Wetherbee, meteorologist (deceased)
