= WGGA =

- Gainesville, Georgia; United States
- Broadcast area: Northern Atlanta metropolitan area
- Frequency: 1240 kHz
- Branding: The Lake 94.5 FM - 1240 AM

Programming
- Format: Adult contemporary
- Affiliations: Westwood One

Ownership
- Owner: Jwj Properties, Inc.
- Sister stations: WDUN; WDUN-FM

History
- First air date: October 10, 1941 (84 years ago)
- Former frequencies: 1240 kHz (1941–1954); 550 kHz (1954–1983)
- Call sign meaning: "Gainesville, Georgia"

Technical information
- Licensing authority: FCC
- Facility ID: 32977
- Class: C
- Power: 1,000 watts unlimited
- Transmitter coordinates: 34°19′1.00″N 83°49′45.00″W
- Translator: 94.5 W233CO (Gainesville)

Links
- Public license information: Public file; LMS
- Webcast: Listen Live
- Website: 945thelake.net

WGGA (1240 kHz "The Lake") is a commercial AM radio station broadcasting an adult contemporary radio format. Licensed to Gainesville, Georgia, United States, the station serves the northern section of the Atlanta metropolitan area. It is currently owned by Jwj Properties, Inc. and features programming from Westwood One.

WGGA is simulcast on an FM translator, W233CO at 94.5 MHz, in Gainesville.

== History ==
WGGA first signed on the air in October 10, 1941 on 1240 kilocycles. It was owned by Gainesville Broadcasters, with Henry H. Estes serving as the General Manager. At first, it was powered at only 250 watts. In 1945, the station began its affiliation with the Mutual Broadcasting System. WGGA later replaced its affiliation with CBS Radio in February 1960.

AM 550 WCON, owned by The Atlanta Constitution, went off the air in 1953, due to the merger with the Atlanta Journal. WGGA was awarded the 550 frequency, a position lower on the dial and able to cover much of Northern Georgia. It was powered at 5,000 watts by day, 500 watts at night. WDUN took over the 1240 position on the dial in Gainesville that WGGA had vacated.

In 1983, WDUN acquired WGGA and again switched frequencies. WDUN took over the 550 kHz spot on the dial, while WGGA returned to 1240 kHz. In 1993, the two stations became co-owned, along with 102.9 WDUN-FM. WGGA switched to a sports format, featuring programming from the ESPN Radio Network. It called itself "The Ticket."

WGGA's logo as a sports station.

On April 16, 2018, WGGA after adding an FM translator at 94.5 FM, it changed its format from sports to adult contemporary.
