= WDGR =

Dahlonega, Georgia; United States
- Frequency: 1210 kHz

Programming
- Format: Defunct
- Affiliations: Westwood One

Ownership
- Owner: Hye Cha Kim

History
- First air date: March 1, 1982
- Last air date: November 5, 2018
- Former call signs: WAAH (1982–1982)
- Call sign meaning: W Dahlonega Gold Radio

Technical information
- Facility ID: 24459
- Class: D
- Power: 10,000 watts day 2,500 watts critical hours
- Transmitter coordinates: 34°31′45.00″N 84°0′23.00″W

WDGR (1210 AM) is a defunct radio station formerly licensed to Dahlonega, Georgia, United States. The station was owned by Hye Cha Kim and featured a country music format with programming from Westwood One.

== History ==
WDGR was founded by William S. Kinsland and Michael Hollifield (both residents of Dahlonega, Georgia), dba "Blue Ridge Radio Co. Inc." The first license applications were filed in 1977. After extensive litigation with competing applications, the initial Construction Permit was issued in 1981. The station went on the air as WAAH on March 1, 1982. Initially, the station operated on a frequency of 1520 kHz at an authorized power of 500 watts. On August 1, 1982, the station changed its call sign to the current WDGR. In October 1982, Kinsland sold his interest in the station to Kevin Croom.

The station's license was surrendered to the Federal Communications Commission (FCC) on November 5, 2018. At the time, WDGR had been off the air for significant periods since October 2007, due to what it described as financial and equipment-related issues. The FCC cancelled WDGR's license on November 7, 2018.
