= Wills v. Commissioner =

- Court: United States Court of Appeals for the Ninth Circuit
- Full case name: Maurice M. Wills and Gertrude E. Wills v. Commissioner of Internal Revenue
- Decided: May 14, 1969
- Citation: 411 F.2d 537 (9th Cir. 1969)

Court membership
- Judges sitting: Stanley Barnes, Benjamin Duniway, James Marshall Carter

Case opinions
- Majority: Barnes, joined by Duniway, Carter

Laws applied
- Internal Revenue Code

Wills v. Commissioner, 411 F. 2d 537 (9th Cir. 1969) was a United States taxation case decided by the United States Court of Appeals for the Ninth Circuit in 1969.

== Facts and case history ==
The taxpayers were a professional baseball player for a California team and his wife, whose family resided in Washington. The taxpayers had received a car and a belt for athletic achievements. The taxpayers were notified of deficiencies in reported income for improper business travel and award deductions. The Commissioner of Internal Revenue determined that deductions for travel, meals, and lodging were not deductible under 26 U.S.C. § 62, and that the taxpayers owed taxes on the fair market value of the car and belt under 26 U.S.C. § 74.

The United States Tax Court sustained respondent Commissioner's determination of deficiencies in the taxpayers' income taxes paid due to improper deductions under 26 U.S.C.S. §§ 62(2)(B), 74. -- contending that California was not their home and that the car and belt were non-taxable civic achievement awards.

== Opinion of the court ==
The Ninth Circuit affirmed the Commissioner's decision, concluding that the taxpayers' tax home was Los Angeles because that city was the permanent post of duty. Thus, expenses incurred in that area were not deductible business expenses. Moreover, the taxpayer's car and belt were taxable as ordinary income because receipt of awards or prizes for athletic achievement were not excepted under § 74. The awards were taxable as ordinary income based on their fair market value when they were received.

The court affirmed the Commissioner's decision that the taxpayers reported deficient income because travel, meals, and lodging expenses incurred in the city that was one taxpayer's primary post of duty were not deductible business expenses. Furthermore, the taxpayers owed taxes on the fair market value of awards received in connection with athletic achievements, which were not excepted from ordinary income.
