= WDUN (AM) =

- Gainesville, Georgia; United States
- Broadcast area: Atlanta metropolitan area
- Frequency: 550 kHz
- Branding: North Georgia's News/Talk AM 550 & FM 102.9 WDUN

Programming
- Format: News/talk
- Affiliations: Fox News Radio; Premiere Networks; Salem Radio Network; Westwood One; Motor Racing Network; Performance Racing Network; Atlanta Falcons; Gwinnett Gladiators; Georgia Southern; Gainesville High School

Ownership
- Owner: Jacobs Media Corporation
- Sister stations: WDUN-FM; WGGA

History
- First air date: April 2, 1949
- Former frequencies: 1400 kHz (1949–1953); 1240 kHz (1953–1983)

Technical information
- Licensing authority: FCC
- Facility ID: 32976
- Class: B
- Power: 10,000 watts day 2,500 watts night
- Transmitter coordinates: 34°20′09″N 83°47′33″W
- Repeater: 102.9 WDUN-FM (Clarkesville)

Links
- Public license information: Public file; LMS
- Webcast: Listen Live
- Website: wdun.com

WDUN (550 kHz), known as "North Georgia's Newstalk", is a news/talk formatted AM radio station licensed to the city Gainesville, Georgia, in the Atlanta, Georgia radio market. WDUN is licensed as a Class B AM broadcast facility by the Federal Communications Commission operating with 10,000 watts of power during the daytime using a non-directional antenna signal pattern, and 2,500 watts during nighttime using a directional antenna pattern. The station is currently owned by JWJ Properties, Inc., doing business as Jacobs Media Corporation, which also operates WDUN-FM in Clarkesville, Georgia.

== Programming ==
The radio station features locally originated shows like Mornings on Maine Street, The Martha Zoller Show and Newsroom as part of its weekday programming line up. Nationally syndicated hosts include Mike Gallagher, Todd Starnes, Dave Ramsey, Ken Coleman, Ben Shapiro, Charlie Kirk, Jim Bohannon, George Noory, John Trout and Leo Laporte. WDUN's sports programming includes Atlanta Falcons football, and local prep play-by-play coverage covering a ten-county area. They also air all NASCAR Monster Energy Cup Series and Most NASCAR Xfinity Series Races from either Motor Racing Network or Performance Racing Network

== History ==
About a year after World War II ended, The Atlanta Constitution newspaper was granted a construction permit to build a station on the enviable 550 kHz spot. The paper erected a four -tower, in -line directional array off Defoors Ferry Road, Fulton County, Georgia. WCON hit the southern airwaves in 1947 as a 5000-watt ABC affiliate. Its studios and ample staff were located in the Constitution Building. The FCC suspected that the station's antenna pattern might not be as predictable in practice as it was (in theory) on the application form. When the readings didn't look manageable, the Commission backed away from fully licensing WCON beyond its initial construction permit and program test authorization. Whether the station could have been fixed to the FCC's satisfaction became an academic question when, a year or so later, the Constitution merged with rival The Atlanta Journal. Because (in those pre-duopoly days), the Journal already owned one of the South's finest stations, 50,000-watt WSB 750, the resulting media company (Atlanta Newspapers, Inc.) was only allowed one Atlanta-area AM, so it quickly took troubled WCON dark. Reportedly, much of the equipment was sold to another then-fledgling Atlanta station, WQXI 790.

As part of the station's history, "WDUN 550" and sports formatted 1240 ESPN Radio (WGGA) swapped dial positions in 1983.

Previous logo
