= WDUN-FM =

Simulcasts WDUN, Gainesville
- Clarkesville, Georgia; United States
- Broadcast area: Gainesville, Georgia
- Frequency: 102.9 MHz (HD Radio)
- Branding: North Georgia's News/Talk AM 550 & FM 102.9 WDUN

Programming
- Format: News/talk
- Affiliations: Fox News Radio; Premiere Networks; Salem Radio Network; Westwood One; Motor Racing Network; Performance Racing Network; Atlanta Falcons; Gwinnett Gladiators; Georgia Southern; Gainesville High School

Ownership
- Owner: Jacobs Media; (JWJ Properties, Inc.)
- Sister stations: WDUN; WGGA

History
- First air date: 1990
- Former call signs: WCHM-FM (1990–1990); WMJE (1990–2010)

Technical information
- Licensing authority: FCC
- Facility ID: 32978
- Class: C3
- ERP: 16,000 watts
- HAAT: 126 meters
- Transmitter coordinates: 34°29′5.00″N 83°38′24.00″W

Links
- Public license information: Public file; LMS
- Webcast: Listen Live
- Website: wdun.com

WDUN-FM (102.9 MHz) is a radio station broadcasting a news/talk format. Licensed to Clarkesville, Georgia, the station serves the Northeastern Georgia area. The station is currently owned by JWJ Properties, Inc., doing business as Jacobs Media Corporation, which also operates WDUN (AM) in Gainesville, Georgia.

== History ==
The station signed on the air January 9, 1990 as WCHM, and less than a month later became WMJE 102.9FM, "Majic 103FM", with a soft AC format. The station changed format to Contemporary hit radio in 1997, to Hot Adult Contemporary in 2000, to Oldies in 2003, all the while retaining the "Majic" branding. The station changed to "Kool FM" for a short time before dropping its music programming altogether in 2010.

WMJE dropped its music programming on October 4, 2010, and became News/Talk 102.9 WDUN-FM, partially simulcasting sister station News/Talk AM 550 WDUN.

Former logo

According to FCC records, WDUN-FM had one translator station, W300BF 107.9 MHz in Commerce, Georgia, owned by Athens Christian Radio, Inc. The repeater callsign has now been removed from the FCC FM Query website.

Previous logo

== Sports programming ==
WDUN-FM airs the Gwinnett Braves Radio Network and the Gwinnett Gladiators, as well as Georgia Southern Eagles and the Atlanta Falcons (with which WMJE was affiliated prior to the format change). The station also carries some local high school sports live, including Gainesville High School.
