= New Evangelization Television =

American Catholic television network

- Country: United States
- Headquarters: 1712 10th Avenue, Brooklyn, New York, U.S.

Programming
- Picture format: 480i (SDTV)

Ownership
- Owner: DeSales Media Group, a subsidiary of the Roman Catholic Diocese of Brooklyn

History
- Launched: 1988
- Former names: The Prayer Channel (1988 — December 8, 2008)

Links
- Website: netny.tv

Availability

Streaming media
- netny.tv: 24-hour live stream

New Evangelization Television, or NET-TV, is a Catholic television network based in Brooklyn, New York. The network is owned by DeSales Media Group, the communications arm of the Diocese of Brooklyn, which encompasses the boroughs of Brooklyn and Queens in New York City.

NET TV offers a variety of original and syndicated programming, including Currents News, the first nightly Catholic news show in the United States.

The network is currently building a production and broadcast facility on Pacific Street in the Prospect Heights neighborhood of Brooklyn.

== Programming ==
NET TV airs many hours of original programming every week. In addition to Currents News, original programs produced by the network include Mysteries of the Church, hosted by Tim Moriarty; All Things Catholic, hosted by Joe Estevez; City of Churches, hosted by Anthony Mangano; Breaking Bread, hosted by Msgr. Jamie Gigantiello; In the Arena, hosted by Msgr. Kieran Harrington; On the Block, hosted by Ed Wilkinson; and Reel Faith, hosted by David DiCerto and Steven D. Greydanus.

The network also provides live news coverage of major events, including Papal trips abroad, and live Masses from St. James Cathedral Basilica in Brooklyn.

== Leadership ==
Craig Tubiolo is the Director of Programming and Production for NET TV and has directed and produced award-winning films and TV shows.

Vito Formica is the Executive Director of News Content & Development for DeSales Media Group and works closely with the editorial team at NET on news coverage.

William Maier is the Chief Operating Officer for DeSales Media Group.

== Related media outlets ==
NET TV is one of several Catholic news outlets owned and operated by DeSales Media Group.

The Tablet has been publishing news and opinion in the Diocese of Brooklyn since 1908.

Nuestra Voz is a Spanish-language newspaper and website serving Brooklyn and Queens.

== Facilities ==
NET TV is currently headquartered at 1712 Tenth Ave. in Brooklyn, NY. A state-of-the-art production and broadcast facility is under construction next to the Co-Cathedral of St. Joseph on Pacific Street in the Prospect Heights neighborhood of Brooklyn.

== Awards ==
In 2010, NET TV received its first Emmy Award nomination for the original program Mysteries of the Church.

In 2017, the documentary “Shelter in the City” was nominated for a NY Emmy.

In 2018, the documentary “Refugees: Enemies or Victims?” was nominated for a NY Emmy.

"Shelter in the City" and "Refugees: Enemies or Victims?" were produced by Craig Syracusa and Terence Donnellan and directed by Donnellan.

== History ==
In 1960, six superintendents from the Roman Catholic Dioceses of Brooklyn, Rockville Centre, Bridgeport, Newark and Jersey City, as well as the Archdiocese of New York, decided to use television as a means of education within their parochial schools. In 1965, production by the Brooklyn diocese began on educational and religious shows for Catholic schools in the area, under the name Instructional Television Associates (ITA). In 1966, the newly renamed Catholic Television Network (CTN) began broadcast from Bishop Ford Central Catholic High School in Brooklyn. CTN still produces religious and educational material for schools.

The Prayer Channel was spun off from CTN in 1988 and was developed via an advisory group of people in church media and diocesan agencies. It began broadcasting as a daytime channel and gradually added weekends and nights. By 1990, it was broadcasting 24 hours a day.

Inspired by the call from Pope John Paul II for "New Evangelization" in the media, the network revamped its image, mission and name on Dec. 8, 2008, becoming New Evangelization Television. The network’s goal has always been to focus on Brooklyn and Queens and to appeal to a diverse audience. In 2009, the channel launched Currents News.

== See also ==
- 1988 in American television
- Catholic television
- Catholic television channels
- Catholic television networks
