= Lino Rulli =

American radio personality

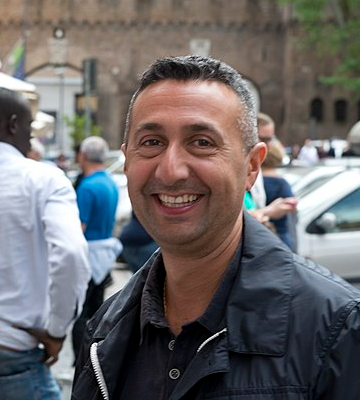
- Rulli in 2014
- Born: Angelo Gino Armando Rulli; October 26, 1971 (age 54); Saint Paul, Minnesota, U.S.
- Education: Bachelor of Arts; Master of Theology
- Alma mater: Saint John's University
- Occupations: Radio host, author, producer, television host
- Years active: 1997–present
- Website: linorulli.com

Angelo Gino Armando "Lino" Rulli (born October 26, 1971) is an American radio host, author, producer, and former television host. He is currently the host of The Catholic Guy Show, which is aired on The Catholic Channel on Sirius XM Radio Channel 129. He was also the executive producer and host of the Emmy Award-winning television series, Generation Cross. In addition to his radio and television work, Rulli has released two books, both of which discuss Catholicism in a comedic tone through personal anecdotes. He is the personal media adviser to Cardinal Timothy Dolan.

== Early life ==
=== Family ===
Rulli was born on October 26, 1971, to an Italian American family in Saint Paul, Minnesota. His family was the only Catholic family on his block growing up, and his father typically only attended Mass on Christmas and Easter. His mother had two goals for him growing up: to teach him to speak French and to teach him the Catholic faith. His two middle names were for his two grandfathers. He has said that he remembers his grandfather Armando as either at work or at prayer.

His mother Gina, is one of three sisters, and the only one who was born in the United States. She worked as a foreign language teacher at a local high school while his father Angelo worked as a probation officer during his early life.

When Rulli was 15, his father joined Circus Flora. Rulli dropped out of school to perform as the assistant to his father's organ grinding and to ride an elephant as part of the finale. The elder Rulli made the decision to make the career change after praying about it before the Eucharist in St. Peter's Basilica. The son would dress up as a monkey and dance while the father played the music. On one occasion, they performed at the singer Prince's birthday party. The father was a frequent guest on A Prairie Home Companion.

Rulli's father taught him about the birds and the bees in the seventh grade when he "threw a book in my general direction, and said, 'Let me know if you have any questions.'" He has a cousin who became an archbishop in 2000 and was friends with Cardinal Joseph Ratzinger, the future Pope Benedict XVI.

=== High school ===
Rulli is a graduate of the Catholic Hill-Murray High School in Maplewood, Minnesota. He "lettered" in theater all four years. In an attempt to be popular, he joined the wrestling team and wrestled for varsity, but only because there was no one else in his weight class, and he was pinned in each of his matches. Rulli would often pray to become popular in high school. During his senior year, he picked the lock on the door, broke into the school, and placed a large B on the name above the front door so that it read Bill-Murray High School.

After being confirmed in the 8th grade, he no longer saw how the church fit into his life and so he quietly left the church. From adolescence on, he aspired to a career in comedy.

=== College ===
Rulli received a Bachelor of Arts Degree in Communications and a Master of Theology Degree from Saint John's University. While in college he was part of a hip hop duo and hosted a weekly radio show called D-Love and Lazy Lin's Show of Pleasure. They wrote and recorded a single song, "Whatever Happened To," a retrospective from the mid-1980s to the current date in 1991.

During his time in college, Rulli began to dabble in radio. In 1991, he hosted his first program on college radio station KJNB. He speaks of the forgiveness he received from his parents after being arrested twice for being in possession of alcohol while underage as a metaphor for the forgiveness of God. He has also written of his experimentation with illegal drugs while in college.

During his junior year, Rulli found the body of his friend and roommate after he committed suicide by shooting himself inside his car. Several days earlier he had discovered what he thought to be suicide notes but did not really discuss it with his friend. The experience caused him to sleep with a nightlight for years until one night when he was on a retreat with the theme "The Lord is my light and my salvation" and forgot to plug it in.

It was in college that he began to get serious about his faith whereas before he treated Mass like going to the dentist, something to be done because those in authority decreed it. He received the sacrament of reconciliation for the first time since his childhood during his freshman year, and then did not again until seven years later in Rome. During his senior year, a professor offhandedly asked him if he had ever considered a graduate degree in theology which "picked some kind of lock in my brain." Until that moment he had never considered theology as a major, but after that he said "it just made sense."

== Career ==
=== Early ===
In 1996, Rulli moved to The Bahamas to teach high school religion at St. Augustine's College. While there, he coached the boys soccer team to a national championship, despite not knowing much about soccer beforehand.

He chose the high crime neighborhood in which he lived because there was a Benedictine monastery attached to the school, and was discerning a vocation to become a monk. He lived there for a few months, and at the end of his stay asked the prior his opinion on becoming a brother. "With the assurance of someone who didn't have to think twice," the prior told him no, that he was too immature, and that at 24 there was too much for him to do in the world.

Rulli moved to Rome in January 1997 to learn the language and lived in Trastevere with a woman from France and a woman from Germany. While in college he only attended Mass about twice a month, and while in Rome he began to attend regularly.

In 2001 he had monthly meetings with his bishop to discern a vocation to the priesthood.

=== Television ===
Rulli began his television career as a reporter for WCCO-TV, then later a commentator for KMSP-TV, both stations based out of Minneapolis, Minnesota. Rulli then began a solo project, Generation Cross, a television show he hosted and produced from 1998 to 2004. The show was nationally syndicated on multiple Catholic media networks, including CatholicTV. Rulli has won three Emmy Awards and has been nominated for others.

Generation Cross was designed to be a "Catholic TV show people would actually watch." It featured Rulli rock climbing with priests, golfing with nuns, and generally learning about the Catholic faith while having fun. It won Emmy awards in 2000 and 2001, making Rulli the first person to win an Emmy award for Catholic broadcasting since Bishop Fulton Sheen.

After Generation Cross, Rulli co-executive produced The Last Flagraiser, a CBS documentary honoring the World War II soldiers who raised the flag at the Battle of Iwo Jima. The documentary won the Emmy Award for Documentary, the Scripps-Howard National Journalism Award, the National Headliner Grand Award and the RTNDA Edward R. Murrow Award. In 2008, Rulli co-produced the film Champions of Faith in which devout Christian baseball players are interviewed.

In the mid-2000s, Rulli did freelance work for the United States Conference of Catholic Bishops. As of 2017, he is the personal media adviser to Cardinal Timothy M. Dolan.

Rulli also makes frequent appearances on news channels, often discussing Catholic current events and other religious issues. Specifically, he has been featured on various CNN and Fox News Channel shows, including Piers Morgan Live and Fox News Live respectively. He has worked for major television networks, cable networks, and PBS. His television production company, Linose Productions, is a play on his name and his large nose.

=== Radio ===
Rulli is currently the host of The Catholic Guy Show, a radio show aired weekdays on The Catholic Channel on SiriusXM Satellite Radio. In the past, he hosted "Lino at Large," a radio show sponsored by the United States Conference of Catholic Bishops syndicated throughout North America. A previous iteration of Lino at Large was canceled in 2006 because the stations on which it ran catered to an audience of people over 55, and his show was geared towards young adults. Shortly thereafter, he was recommended as a host on the Catholic Channel on Sirius.

Rulli has also made appearances on Howard Stern's Sirius XM channels (Howard 100 and Howard 101), specifically The Jay Thomas Show and Howard 100 News. Following immediate success of The Catholic Guy, twin cities Minneapolis and Saint Paul declared September 29 to be "Lino Rulli Day" (initiated in 2010).

His three greatest radio influences were the hosts of a Minneapolis morning show from when he was a child, Garrison Keillor, and especially Stern.

=== Print ===
In September 2011, Rulli released his first book, Sinner: The Catholic Guy's Funny, Feeble Attempt to Be a Faithful Catholic, in which he shares the joys and the struggles of trying to follow God in everyday circumstances. Sinner was promoted on a variety of media facets, including CatholicTV, Fox News Channel, and Howard 100 News. Two years later, he released his second book, Saint: Why I Should Be Canonized Right Away, in which he comedically discusses how he is bound for sainthood. In 2020, in the wake of the coronavirus pandemic, Rulli released his first E-book, We're All Gonna Die: Be Not Afraid?.

== Personal life ==
Rulli would frequently joke about his struggles in relationships on his radio show, even to the point of discussing his problems with a dating coach. He confessed to having a fear of commitment. On his radio show, Rulli would occasionally play "The Catholic Guy Dating Game" and got two girlfriends from it.

After years of this recurring theme, Rulli announced his engagement to his girlfriend, Jill, in May 2015. They married at St. Peter's Basilica in Vatican City on April 22, 2016. On June 27, 2023, Rulli announced that Jill was pregnant and that he was the father. He admits to having "a slightly unhealthy relationship with Facebook and Twitter and seeing how many people 'like" or 'follow'" him. He travels frequently and was "obsessed with hitting the million-mile mark.” As of 2023, he had traveled 1,605,000 miles. He spends his birthday each year in Rome.

== Honors and awards ==
In 2010, a number of places and items were named for Rulli in his hometown of Minneapolis. A bowling alley, Memory Lanes, named a gutter for Rulli, Kieran's Pub named a restroom stall for him, and Tom Reid's Hockey City Pub named a drink. Stella's Fish Cafe named a lobster for Rulli; the crew of his radio show then ate it for dinner. In addition, he received a ceremonial key to the Cathedral of St. Paul.

Rulli was the executive producer on a CBS documentary that won the Edward R. Murrow Award, the Emmy Award for Documentary, the Scripps-Howard National Journalism Award. He has won two other Emmys. He was the first person since Bishop Fulton Sheen to win an Emmy Award for Catholic broadcasting.

Rulli was also the 2019 resident at the Eugene J. McCarthy Center for Public Policy and Civic Engagement. The McCarthy Resident showcases the work and skills of someone who has a distinguished career in public service, policy, or politics through a week-long on-campus residency. Through visits to classes, cafeterias, practices, and public programs, the McCarthy resident engages a wide spectrum of the CSB/SJU community and the general public. The McCarthy residency culminates in a dinner honoring the resident and a final keynote program open to the campus community and the public. The primary purpose of the residency is to give students extended access to someone with real knowledge and wisdom about policy, civic engagement, and public life.

== Filmography ==
Year	Title	Role	Notes
1998–2004	Generation Cross	Host	Emmy Award for Program Host (2001); Emmy Award for Program Host (2002)
2005	The Last Flagraiser	Producer	Emmy Award for Best Documentary (2005); Scripps-Howard National Journalism Award (2005); Edward R. Murrow Award (2005); National Headliner Award – Documentary (2006)
2008	Champions of Faith	Producer	

== Bibliography ==
- Rulli, Lino (2011). Sinner: The Catholic Guy's Funny, Feeble Attempts to Be a Faithful Catholic. Cincinnati, Ohio: Servant Books. ISBN 978-1-61636-039-9.
- Rulli, Lino (2013). Saint: Why I Should Be Canonized Right Away. Cincinnati, Ohio: Servant Books. ISBN 978-1-61636-668-1.
- Rulli, Lino (2020). We're All Gonna Die: Be Not Afraid? (PDF). Self-published E-book. Archived from the original (PDF) on March 19, 2020.
