= The Catholic Guy Show =

Radio talk show

The Catholic Guy
- Genre: Talk, religious, entertainment
- Running time: 2 hours (4 p.m.–6 p.m. ET, Monday–Friday)
- Country of origin: United States
- Language: English
- Home station: The Catholic Channel (SiriusXM 129)
- Starring: Lino Rulli
- Original release: December 4, 2006
- Opening theme: "It's The Catholic Guy Show with Lino Rulli..." by Tyler Veghte
- Website: www.catholicguy.com
- Podcast: The Catholic Guy Podcast

The Catholic Guy Show is a radio talk show currently aired on The Catholic Channel on Sirius XM Radio, a subscription-based satellite radio service, since December 4, 2006. Hosted by Lino Rulli, Emmy Award-winning Catholic personality, The Catholic Guy show discusses life, religion, and theology in a humorous fashion through the eyes of an average Catholic guy.

The show has been recognized by The New York Times for its spontaneity and edginess, having ability to sound like catechism class one minute and The Howard Stern Show the next.

== History ==
It was first announced in May 2006 that The Catholic Channel would come to Sirius Satellite Radio later that year; the channel's purpose was to spread the Word in a new way. It then was announced that Emmy Award-winning television host Lino Rulli would host the afternoon drive show (4–7 PM Eastern) on the new channel. The first broadcast of the show was on December 4, 2006 with Rulli alongside producer Maureen McMurray, technical director Lou Ruggieri, and phone screener Tom Falcone. Frequent appearances were also made by program director Rob Astorino. Father Jim Chern also began to appear frequently after his well reception from playing the game "Push-ups for Prayers".

In 2008, Falcone was the first of the original four crew members to depart from the show. Christine Stern/Lloyd became the new phone screener until 2009. McMurray left later that year to pursue a career with NPR, then later Martha Stewart Living Radio. The show was then introduced to Father Rob Keighron, who first appeared as a guest but began making weekly appearances. Ryan Stewart briefly filled the producer void in 2008, followed by Jared Rizzi until he departed in 2009. McMurray went on to return to the show in September 2009. Rulli described the show as being back to "the way it was ever meant to be" with himself, Ruggieri, and McMurray broadcasting together until 2011.

In April 2011, Rulli announced that long-time assistant producer/technical director Lou Ruggieri would depart from the show. Ryan Grant was hired in May to work alongside McMurray as assistant producer. Less than a month after Grant was hired, McMurray again left the show. Rulli and Grant continued to broadcast each day with frequent appearances by Father Rob Keighron. It was announced in September 2011 that Keighron would join the show full-time and serve as co-host alongside Rulli, as well as co-producer. Grant left the show in late 2011. In late 2012, the show moved to a new slot, live Monday–Thursday from 5–7 PM Eastern, and Friday from 11 AM–1 PM Eastern.

On October 10, 2013 Father Rob Keighron announced his departure as co-host; his final full-time show was October 25. Rulli then announced his plans to change the format of the show, leaving the New York City studio to broadcast from a different city each week to focus on individual Catholic ministries. Keighron continued to make periodic in-studio guest appearances with Rulli until June 19, 2014, when he announced his full departure from the show and active ministry. Following the format change, the show began to broadcast only Monday–Thursday from 5–7 PM Eastern, with no live show on Fridays; however in January 2015, the show moved back to its former slot (live Monday–Friday from 5–7 PM Eastern).

In September 2016, Rulli announced another format change. After three years of broadcasting the show on the road, Rulli returned to New York to broadcast daily shows from his apartment. This format featured rotating co-hosts Mark Hart and Father Jim Chern. Both longtime periodic guests, Hart and Chern joined the show full-time, with Hart co-hosting three days per week and Chern two. Hart had been with the show since the first week of its existence, and Chern first appeared in August 2007. Chern originally got Sirius XM to listen to Howard Stern, and eventually stumbled upon Rulli's show where "for about 15 minutes, [he] couldn't tell if the show was pro-Catholic or anti-Catholic." This format continued until Chern's announced departure on June 6, 2019. A similar format still exists after Rulli's 2020 move to Minnesota. Hart remained as co-host until his departure of the full-time role in September 2022. Rulli currently hosts the show five days per week with producer Tyler Veghte as co-host, with occasional appearances by assistant producer Chuck.

== Show content and format ==
The Catholic Guy consists of an average "Catholic guy" (Rulli) discussing both current events and personal religious issues in a humorous (and sometimes off-color) light.

=== 2006–2013 ===
The original format was featured during its first seven years. The show would begin with Rulli discussing something on his mind, followed by callers' input and opinions. This usually led into many different segments, which could be caller input discussions, games in which callers won religious prizes, or in-studio guests. The show featured a relatively small number of celebrity guests during its original format run, with notable guests appearing once every few months on average during that time.

=== 2013–2016 ===
Following the departure of his co-host Father Rob Keighron in October 2013, Rulli announced a new format for The Catholic Guy. In the new format, each week Rulli travels around the world to various outreach ministries, colleges, youth organizations, and other Catholic institutions. In each show, he discussed the organization by often featuring co-hosts and guests, adding humor to the discussions.

=== 2016–present ===
After Rulli married in 2016, The Catholic Guy ended its tenure of travelling throughout the world for broadcasts. Rulli returned to New York to broadcast shows in a similar style to the 2006–2013 format (featuring various segments, games, and occasional guests). The same format still exists presently after Rulli's move to Minnesota in 2020.

=== Opening theme music ===
- "It's The Catholic Guy Show with Lino Rulli..." by Tyler Veghte (2017–present)
- "My Hero" by Foo Fighters (2011–2017)
- "Soul Bossa Nova" by Quincy Jones (2006–2011)

== Cast, crew, and guests ==
=== Current crew members ===
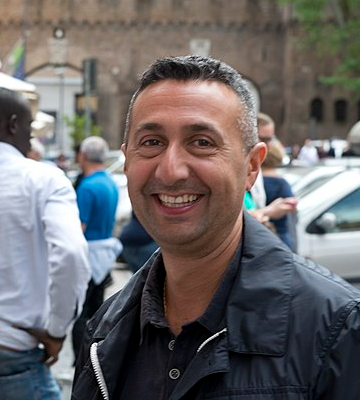
Lino Rulli, host

- Lino Rulli – host (2006–present)
- Tyler Veghte – producer, co-host (2015–present)
- Chuck – content manager (2022–present)

=== Periodic co-hosts and guests ===
- Mark Hart ("Bible Geek", Executive Vice President of Life Teen) – periodic guest (2006–2016); co-host (2016–2022); periodic guest (2022–present)
- Tom Leopold (comedy writer) – (2012–present)
- Jennifer Fulwiler (stand-up comedian, religious author, former "Catholic Channel" host) – (2014–present)
- Gina (Rulli's mom) – (2007–present)
- Jill Rulli (Rulli's wife) – (2015–present)

=== Past crew members and guests ===
- Father Jim Chern (priest, chaplain at Montclair State University, "America's Favorite College Campus Minister") – (2007–2019)
- Jonathan Morris (Fox News Channel analyst) – (2012–2018)
- Hallie Lord (author, "The Catholic Channel" host); periodic co-host – (2014–2018)
- Rob Keighron – weekly guest (2008–2011); co-host/co-producer (2011–2013); periodic guest (2013–2014; 2015)
- Lou Ruggieri – technical director (2006–2009); assistant producer (2009–2011); periodic co-host (2014–2016)
- Leah Darrow (model, Catholic speaker) – (2014–2016)
- Kerry Weber (America managing editor, "The Catholic Channel" periodic guest) – (2014–2016)
- Kayla Riley (host on Sirius XM's Octane, Ozzy's Boneyard & The Message Amped) – periodic guest (2007–2013)
- Scott Shea – co-producer (2011–2012)
- Ryan Grant – co-producer (2011)
- Maureen McMurray – producer (2006–2008, 2009–2011)
- Krista D'Amore – intern (Summer 2010)
- Ryan Stewart – producer (2008); periodic guest (2008–2010)
- Rob Astorino – "The Catholic Channel" program director (2006–2009)
- Jared Rizzi – producer (2008–2009)
- Christine Stern (aka Christine Lloyd) – phone screener (2008–2009)
- Tom "the Bird" Falcone – "Professional Phone Answerer" (2006–2008)
- Emily Dunning – intern (Summer 2008)
- Josh – producer (2006)

== Notable guests ==
Although Rulli often states he does not like having guests on the show, The Catholic Guy has featured many notable guests throughout its existence:

- John L. Allen Jr. – journalist
- Coffey Anderson – singer
- Kurt Angle – professional wrestler
- Jay Bakker – televangelist
- Kelvin Beachum – football player
- Jim Breuer – comedian
- Sam Brownback – U.S. Representative, Kansas
- Mark Burnett – television producer
- Tia Carrere – actress/model/singer
- Jim Caviezel – actor
- Charles J. Chaput – Archbishop of Denver
- Harry Connick Jr. – singer/actor
- Tom Cotter – comedian
- Tom Coughlin – football coach
- Leah Darrow – model/speaker
- Robert Davi – actor/singer
- Gary Dell'Abate – The Howard Stern Show producer
- Goo Goo Dolls – band
- Timothy M. Dolan – Cardinal, Archbishop of New York
- Roma Downey – actress/producer/singer
- Edward Egan – Cardinal, Archbishop Emeritus of New York
- Emilio Estevez – actor/director/author
- Jars of Clay – band
- Joe Eszterhas – screenwriter
- Jim Florentine – comedian/actor
- Nick Foles – football player, Super Bowl MVP
- John Patrick Foley – Cardinal, Grand Master of the Order of the Holy Sepulchre
- Rob Ford – former Mayor of Toronto
- Stan Fortuna – priest/musician
- Kirk Franklin – singer/author
- Andy García – actor
- Newt Gingrich – former Speaker of the House
- Mark-Paul Gosselaar – actor
- Bear Grylls – television presenter/author
- Vinny Guadagnino – television personality/actor
- Pete Holmes – comedian
- Matt Hughes – mixed martial artist
- Oscar Isaac – actor
- Derek Jeter – baseball player
- Renaldo Lapuz – singer
- Sugar Ray Leonard – professional boxer
- Ray Liotta – actor
- Matt Maher – singer
- Sebastian Maniscalco – comedian
- Cheech Marin – comedian/actor/writer
- Denis McDonough – former White House Chief of Staff
- Ed McMahon – comedian
- Chazz Palminteri – actor/author
- Vincent Pastore – actor
- Joseph A. Pepe – Bishop of Las Vegas
- Troy Polamalu – football player
- Dennis Quaid – actor
- Al Roker – weatherman/actor/author
- Mike Rowe – reality television host
- John Schneider – actor/singer
- Paul Shaffer – musician/actor
- Martin Sheen – actor/political activist
- Joseph Simmons – rapper/reverend
- Tom Sizemore – actor/producer
- Sean P. Stellato – sports agent
- Luis Antonio Tagle – Cardinal, Archbishop of Manila
- Tim Tebow – football player
- Mark Wahlberg – actor
- Nik Wallenda – daredevil
- George Wendt – actor
- Christopher West – author/speaker
- Lisa Whelchel – actress/speaker
