= The Catholic Channel =

American religious radio station

- Broadcast area: United States; Canada
- Frequency: SiriusXM Radio Channel 129

Programming
- Format: Catholic radio

Ownership
- Owner: Roman Catholic Archdiocese of New York

History
- First air date: December 4, 2006

Links
- Website: www.thecatholicchannel.org

The Catholic Channel is a radio station on SiriusXM Radio (Channel 129) airing a Catholic radio format, operated by the Archdiocese of New York. It carries daily and Sunday Mass live from St. Patrick's Cathedral in New York City, as well as talk shows, educational programming and a small amount of music. The channel also broadcasts University of Notre Dame football games.

Most of the programming consists of call-in talk shows hosted by Roman Catholic personalities, such as The Busted Halo Show, featuring a Catholic priest with the Paulist Fathers. Catholic doctrine and lifestyle is discussed, such as current events, political issues, comedy, psychological issues, family life, among other things. Ronald Hicks, Archbishop of New York, also hosts a one-hour weekly program.

== Background ==
The Catholic Channel was founded by Cardinal Edward Egan, Archbishop of New York, in 2006. The intention of the channel is to discuss Catholicism in a nontraditional manner, serving as an alternative to other Catholic media programs like EWTN. It began broadcasting on Sirius Satellite Radio channel 159 on December 4, 2006.Upon the merger of Sirius and XM Satellite Radio to form SiriusXM Radio on November 12, 2008, The Catholic Channel was made available on XM receivers.

Initial personalities still on the air include Lino Rulli, producer and former television host, and Father Dave Dwyer, ordained priest. Cardinal Edward Egan also hosted a show, A Conversation with the Cardinal. Upon his retirement, his successor Timothy M. Dolan hosted Conversation with Cardinal Dolan, from 2011 until his retirement in 2026. Ronald Hicks, Dolan's successor, hosts the current incarnation, All Good Things, airing weekly.

== Programming ==
=== Daily shows ===
- The Busted Halo Show with Father Dave Dwyer
- The Catholic Guy Show with Lino Rulli
- The Doug Tooke Show with Doug Tooke
- The Katie McGrady Show with Katie McGrady

=== Weekly shows ===
- All Good Things with Archbishop Ronald Hicks
- Frontiers of Faith with Katie Ruvalcaba and Fr. Anthony Andreassi
- Just Love with Msgr. Kevin Sullivan
- Strong Voices with Kathryn Whitaker and Rachel Bulman
- Word to Life with Father John Maria Devaney, O.P.
- Sounds from the Spires with Dr. Jennifer Pascual

=== Weekend shows ===
- Christopher Closeup with Dennis Heaney
- Let Me Be Frank with Bishop Frank Caggiano
- Pastoral Reflections with Father Don Fischer
- Personally Speaking with Msgr. Jim Lisante
- Religion and Rock with Msgr. Jim Vlaun
- Salt and Light Hour with Deacon Pedro Guevara Mann

== See also ==
- Roman Catholic Archdiocese of New York
