= List of AM radio stations in the United States by call sign (initial letters WA–WF) =

This is a list of AM radio stations in the United States having call signs beginning with the letters WA to WF.

== WA-- ==
Callsign	Frequency	City of license
WAAF	910 AM	Scranton, Pennsylvania
WAAM	1600 AM	Ann Arbor, Michigan
WAAV	980 AM	Leland, North Carolina
WAAX	570 AM	Gadsden, Alabama
WABA	850 AM	Aguadilla, Puerto Rico
WABB	1390 AM	Belton, South Carolina
WABC	770 AM	New York City
WABF	1480 AM	Mobile, Alabama
WABG	960 AM	Greenwood, Mississippi
WABH	1380 AM	Bath, New York
WABJ	1490 AM	Adrian, Michigan
WABL	1570 AM	Amite, Louisiana
WABN	1230 AM	Abingdon, Virginia
WABO	990 AM	Waynesboro, Mississippi
WABQ	1460 AM	Painesville, Ohio
WABV	1590 AM	Abbeville, South Carolina
WABY	900 AM	Watervliet, New York
WACA	900 AM	Laurel, Maryland
WACB	860 AM	Taylorsville, North Carolina
WACC	830 AM	Hialeah, Florida
WACE	730 AM	Chicopee, Massachusetts
WACK	1420 AM	Newark, New York
WACM	1270 AM	Springfield, Massachusetts
WACQ	580 AM	Tuskegee, Alabama
WACT	1420 AM	Tuscaloosa, Alabama
WADE	1340 AM	Wadesboro, North Carolina
WADK	1540 AM	Newport, Rhode Island
WADO	1280 AM	New York City
WADS	690 AM	Ansonia, Connecticut
WADV	940 AM	Lebanon, Pennsylvania
WAEB	790 AM	Allentown, Pennsylvania
WAEC	860 AM	Atlanta
WAEW	1330 AM	Crossville, Tennessee
WAEY	1490 AM	Princeton, West Virginia
WAFC	590 AM	Clewiston, Florida
WAFN	1310 AM	Priceville, Alabama
WAFS	1190 AM	Atlanta
WAFZ	1490 AM	Immokalee, Florida
WAGG	610 AM	Birmingham, Alabama
WAGN	1340 AM	Menominee, Michigan
WAGR	1340 AM	Lumberton, North Carolina
WAGY	1320 AM	Forest City, North Carolina
WAHT	1560 AM	Cowpens, South Carolina
WAIM	1230 AM	Anderson, South Carolina
WAIN	1270 AM	Columbia, Kentucky
WAIS	770 AM	Buchtel, Ohio
WAIZ	630 AM	Hickory, North Carolina
WAJD	1390 AM	Gainesville, Florida
WAJL	1400 AM	South Boston, Virginia
WAJR	1440 AM	Morgantown, West Virginia
WAKE	1500 AM	Valparaiso, Indiana
WAKI	1230 AM	McMinnville, Tennessee
WAKM	950 AM	Franklin, Tennessee
WAKO	910 AM	Lawrenceville, Illinois
WAKR	1590 AM	Akron, Ohio
WAKV	980 AM	Otsego, Michigan
WAKY	620 AM	Louisville, Kentucky
WALD	1080 AM	Johnsonville, South Carolina
WALG	1590 AM	Albany, Georgia
WALI	1280 AM	Dayton, Tennessee
WALL	1340 AM	Middletown, New York
WALO	1240 AM	Humacao, Puerto Rico
WALQ	1130 AM	Carrville, Alabama
WAMA	1550 AM	Tampa, Florida
WAMC	1400 AM	Albany, New York
WAMD	970 AM	Aberdeen, Maryland
WAME	550 AM	Statesville, North Carolina
WAMG	890 AM	Dedham, Massachusetts
WAML	1340 AM	Laurel, Mississippi
WAMM	790 AM	Mount Jackson, Virginia
WAMN	1050 AM	Green Valley, West Virginia
WAMO	660 AM	Wilkinsburg, Pennsylvania
WAMT	1190 AM	Pine Castle–Sky Lake, Florida
WAMV	1420 AM	Amherst, Virginia
WAMW	1580 AM	Washington, Indiana
WAMY	1580 AM	Amory, Mississippi
WANB	1210 AM	Waynesburg, Pennsylvania
WANG	1490 AM	Biloxi, Mississippi
WANI	1400 AM	Opelika, Alabama
WAOB	860 AM	Millvale, Pennsylvania
WAOC	1420 AM	St. Augustine, Florida
WAOK	1380 AM	Atlanta
WAOS	1600 AM	Austell, Georgia
WAOV	1450 AM	Vincennes, Indiana
WAPA	1260 AM	Ponce, Puerto Rico
WAPC	860 AM	Opp, Alabama
WAPF	1140 AM	McComb, Mississippi
WAPI	1070 AM	Birmingham, Alabama
WAQE	1090 AM	Rice Lake, Wisconsin
WAQI	710 AM	Miami, Florida
WARA	1320 AM	Attleboro, Massachusetts
WARB	700 AM	Dothan, Alabama
WARE	1250 AM	Ware, Massachusetts
WARF	1350 AM	Akron, Ohio
WARK	1490 AM	Hagerstown, Maryland
WARM	590 AM	Scranton, Pennsylvania
WARR	1520 AM	Warrenton, North Carolina
WARV	1590 AM	Warwick, Rhode Island
WASC	1530 AM	Spartanburg, South Carolina
WASG	540 AM	Daphne, Alabama
WASK	1450 AM	Lafayette, Indiana
WASR	1420 AM	Wolfeboro, New Hampshire
WATA	1450 AM	Boone, North Carolina
WATH	970 AM	Athens, Ohio
WATK	900 AM	Antigo, Wisconsin
WATN	1240 AM	Watertown, New York
WATR	1320 AM	Waterbury, Connecticut
WATS	960 AM	Sayre, Pennsylvania
WATT	1240 AM	Cadillac, Michigan
WATV	900 AM	Birmingham, Alabama
WATW	1400 AM	Ashland, Wisconsin
WATX	1220 AM	Hamden, Connecticut
WAUB	1590 AM	Auburn, New York
WAUC	1310 AM	Wauchula, Florida
WAUD	1230 AM	Auburn, Alabama
WAUG	750 AM	New Hope, North Carolina
WAUK	540 AM	Jackson, Wisconsin
WAUN	1350 AM	Portage, Wisconsin
WAUR	1550 AM	Somonauk, Illinois
WAVA	780 AM	Arlington, Virginia
WAVO	1150 AM	Rock Hill, South Carolina
WAVP	1390 AM	Avon Park, Florida
WAVQ	1400 AM	Jacksonville, North Carolina
WAVS	1170 AM	Davie, Florida
WAVU	630 AM	Albertville, Alabama
WAVZ	1300 AM	New Haven, Connecticut
WAWK	1140 AM	Kendallville, Indiana
WAWO	1400 AM	Alma, Georgia
WAXB	850 AM	Ridgefield, Connecticut
WAXY	790 AM	South Miami, Florida
WAYE	1220 AM	Birmingham, Alabama
WAYN	900 AM	Rockingham, North Carolina
WAYR	550 AM	Fleming Island, Florida
WAYS	1050 AM	Conway, South Carolina
WAYX	1230 AM	Waycross, Georgia
WAYY	790 AM	Eau Claire, Wisconsin
WAZL	730 AM	Nanticoke, Pennsylvania
WAZN	1470 AM	Watertown, Massachusetts
WAZS	980 AM	Summerville, South Carolina
WAZX	1550 AM	Smyrna, Georgia
WAZZ	1490 AM	Fayetteville, North Carolina

== WB-- ==
Callsign	Frequency	City of license
WBAA	920 AM	West Lafayette, Indiana
WBAC	1340 AM	Cleveland, Tennessee
WBAE	1490 AM	Portland, Maine
WBAF	1090 AM	Barnesville, Georgia
WBAG	1150 AM	Burlington, North Carolina
WBAJ	890 AM	Blythewood, South Carolina
WBAL	1090 AM	Baltimore, Maryland
WBAN	1340 AM	Veazie, Maine
WBAP	820 AM	Fort Worth, Texas
WBAT	1400 AM	Marion, Indiana
WBBD	1400 AM	Wheeling, West Virginia
WBBF	1120 AM	Buffalo, New York
WBBM	780 AM	Chicago
WBBP	1480 AM	Memphis, Tennessee
WBBR	1130 AM	New York City
WBBT	1340 AM	Lyons, Georgia
WBBW	1240 AM	Youngstown, Ohio
WBBZ	1230 AM	Ponca City, Oklahoma
WBCB	1490 AM	Levittown, Pennsylvania
WBCE	1200 AM	Wickliffe, Kentucky
WBCF	1240 AM	Florence, Alabama
WBCH	1220 AM	Hastings, Michigan
WBCN	770 AM	North Fort Myers, Florida
WBCO	1540 AM	Bucyrus, Ohio
WBCR	1470 AM	Alcoa, Tennessee
WBCU	1460 AM	Union, South Carolina
WBEC	1420 AM	Pittsfield, Massachusetts
WBEJ	1240 AM	Elizabethton, Tennessee
WBEL	1380 AM	South Beloit, Illinois
WBEN	930 AM	Buffalo, New York
WBES	950 AM	Charleston, West Virginia
WBET	1230 AM	Sturgis, Michigan
WBEV	1430 AM	Beaver Dam, Wisconsin
WBEX	1490 AM	Chillicothe, Ohio
WBFC	1470 AM	Stanton, Kentucky
WBFD	1310 AM	Bedford, Pennsylvania
WBFJ	1550 AM	Winston-Salem, North Carolina
WBFN	1400 AM	Battle Creek, Michigan
WBGA	1490 AM	Brunswick, Georgia
WBGC	1240 AM	Chipley, Florida
WBGG	970 AM	Pittsburgh, Pennsylvania
WBGW	1330 AM	Evansville, Indiana
WBGX	1570 AM	Harvey, Illinois
WBGZ	1570 AM	Alton, Illinois
WBHF	1450 AM	Cartersville, Georgia
WBHN	1590 AM	Bryson City, North Carolina
WBHP	1230 AM	Huntsville, Alabama
WBHR	660 AM	Sauk Rapids, Minnesota
WBHV	1390 AM	State College, Pennsylvania
WBHY	840 AM	Mobile, Alabama
WBIB	1110 AM	Centreville, Alabama
WBIG	1280 AM	Aurora, Illinois
WBIN	640 AM	Atlanta
WBIP	1400 AM	Booneville, Mississippi
WBIW	1340 AM	Bedford, Indiana
WBIX	1260 AM	Boston, Massachusetts
WBIZ	1400 AM	Eau Claire, Wisconsin
WBKK	820 AM	Wilton, Minnesota
WBKW	1070 AM	Beckley, West Virginia
WBLA	1440 AM	Elizabethtown, North Carolina
WBLB	1340 AM	Pulaski, Virginia
WBLC	1360 AM	Lenoir City, Tennessee
WBLF	970 AM	Bellefonte, Pennsylvania
WBLJ	1230 AM	Dalton, Georgia
WBLL	1390 AM	Bellefontaine, Ohio
WBLO	790 AM	Thomasville, North Carolina
WBLQ	1230 AM	Westerly, Rhode Island
WBLR	1430 AM	Batesburg, South Carolina
WBLT	1350 AM	Bedford, Virginia
WBMC	960 AM	McMinnville, Tennessee
WBMD	750 AM	Baltimore, Maryland
WBMJ	1190 AM	San Juan, Puerto Rico
WBML	1350 AM	Warner Robins, Georgia
WBMP	570 AM	Paducah, Kentucky
WBMS	1460 AM	Brockton, Massachusetts
WBMZ	1360 AM	Metter, Georgia
WBNC	1340 AM	Conway, New Hampshire
WBNL	1540 AM	Boonville, Indiana
WBNR	1260 AM	Beacon, New York
WBNS	1460 AM	Columbus, Ohio
WBNW	1120 AM	Concord, Massachusetts
WBOB	600 AM	Jacksonville, Florida
WBOG	1460 AM	Tomah, Wisconsin
WBOJ	1270 AM	Columbus, Georgia
WBOK	1230 AM	New Orleans, Louisiana
WBOL	1560 AM	Bolivar, Tennessee
WBOM	1470 AM	Meriden, Connecticut
WBOX	920 AM	Bogalusa, Louisiana
WBPB	1540 AM	Pickens, South Carolina
WBPZ	1230 AM	Lock Haven, Pennsylvania
WBQH	1050 AM	Silver Spring, Maryland
WBQN	680 AM	San Juan, Puerto Rico
WBRD	1420 AM	Palmetto, Florida
WBRG	1050 AM	Lynchburg, Virginia
WBRI	1500 AM	Indianapolis, Indiana
WBRK	1340 AM	Pittsfield, Massachusetts
WBRM	1250 AM	Marion, North Carolina
WBRN	1460 AM	Big Rapids, Michigan
WBRT	1320 AM	Bardstown, Kentucky
WBRV	900 AM	Boonville, New York
WBRY	1540 AM	Woodbury, Tennessee
WBSA	1300 AM	Boaz, Alabama
WBSG	1510 AM	Lajas, Puerto Rico
WBSM	1420 AM	New Bedford, Massachusetts
WBSR	1450 AM	Pensacola, Florida
WBSS	1490 AM	Pleasantville, New Jersey
WBT	1110 AM	Charlotte, North Carolina
WBTA	1490 AM	Batavia, New York
WBTC	1540 AM	Uhrichsville, Ohio
WBTE	990 AM	Windsor, North Carolina
WBTG	1290 AM	Sheffield, Alabama
WBTH	1400 AM	Williamson, West Virginia
WBTK	1380 AM	Richmond, Virginia
WBTL	1320 AM	Richmond, Virginia
WBTM	1330 AM	Danville, Virginia
WBTN	1370 AM	Bennington, Vermont
WBTX	1470 AM	Broadway–Timberville, Virginia
WBUC	1460 AM	Buckhannon, West Virginia
WBUT	1050 AM	Butler, Pennsylvania
WBVP	1230 AM	Beaver Falls, Pennsylvania
WBVR	1340 AM	Bowling Green, Kentucky
WBWD	540 AM	Islip, New York
WBWX	1280 AM	Berwick, Pennsylvania
WBXR	1140 AM	Hazel Green, Alabama
WBYM	1560 AM	Bayamón, Puerto Rico
WBYS	1560 AM	Canton, Illinois
WBZ	1030 AM	Boston, Massachusetts
WBZB	1130 AM	Murray, Kentucky
WBZH	910 AM	Hayward, Wisconsin
WBZI	1500 AM	Xenia, Ohio
WBZQ	1300 AM	Huntington, Indiana
WBZT	1230 AM	West Palm Beach, Florida

== WC-- ==
Callsign	Frequency	City of license
WCAB	590 AM	Rutherfordton, North Carolina
WCAM	1590 AM	Camden, South Carolina
WCAO	600 AM	Baltimore, Maryland
WCAP	980 AM	Lowell, Massachusetts
WCAR	1090 AM	Livonia, Michigan
WCAZ	1510 AM	Macomb, Illinois
WCBC	1270 AM	Cumberland, Maryland
WCBL	1290 AM	Benton, Kentucky
WCBM	680 AM	Baltimore, Maryland
WCBQ	1340 AM	Oxford, North Carolina
WCBR	1110 AM	Richmond, Kentucky
WCBT	1230 AM	Roanoke Rapids, North Carolina
WCBX	900 AM	Bassett, Virginia
WCBY	1240 AM	Cheboygan, Michigan
WCCD	1000 AM	Parma, Ohio
WCCF	1580 AM	Punta Gorda, Florida
WCCM	1490 AM	Haverhill, Massachusetts
WCCN	1370 AM	Neillsville, Wisconsin
WCCO	830 AM	Minneapolis, Minnesota
WCCR	1260 AM	Cleveland, Ohio
WCCS	1160 AM	Homer City, Pennsylvania
WCCW	1310 AM	Traverse City, Michigan
WCCY	1400 AM	Houghton, Michigan
WCDC	950 AM	Moncks Corner, South Carolina
WCDL	1440 AM	Carbondale, Pennsylvania
WCDO	1490 AM	Sidney, New York
WCDS	1230 AM	Glasgow, Kentucky
WCDT	1340 AM	Winchester, Tennessee
WCED	1420 AM	Du Bois, Pennsylvania
WCEH	610 AM	Hawkinsville, Georgia
WCEM	1240 AM	Cambridge, Maryland
WCEO	840 AM	Columbia, South Carolina
WCFO	1160 AM	East Point, Georgia
WCFR	1480 AM	Springfield, Vermont
WCGA	1100 AM	Woodbine, Georgia
WCGB	1060 AM	Juana Díaz, Puerto Rico
WCGC	1270 AM	Belmont, North Carolina
WCGL	1360 AM	Jacksonville, Florida
WCGO	1590 AM	Evanston, Illinois
WCGR	1550 AM	Canandaigua, New York
WCGW	770 AM	Nicholasville, Kentucky
WCGX	1360 AM	Galax, Virginia
WCHA	800 AM	Chambersburg, Pennsylvania
WCHB	1340 AM	Royal Oak, Michigan
WCHE	1520 AM	West Chester, Pennsylvania
WCHI	1350 AM	Chillicothe, Ohio
WCHJ	1470 AM	Brookhaven, Mississippi
WCHK	1290 AM	Canton, Georgia
WCHL	1360 AM	Chapel Hill, North Carolina
WCHM	1490 AM	Clarkesville, Georgia
WCHO	1250 AM	Washington Court House, Ohio
WCHP	760 AM	Champlain, New York
WCHR	1040 AM	Flemington, New Jersey
WCHS	580 AM	Charleston, West Virginia
WCHT	600 AM	Escanaba, Michigan
WCHV	1260 AM	Charlottesville, Virginia
WCIL	1020 AM	Carbondale, Illinois
WCIS	760 AM	Morganton, North Carolina
WCIT	940 AM	Lima, Ohio
WCJU	1450 AM	Columbia, Mississippi
WCJW	1140 AM	Warsaw, New York
WCKA	810 AM	Jacksonville, Alabama
WCKB	780 AM	Dunn, North Carolina
WCKG	1530 AM	Elmhurst, Illinois
WCKI	1300 AM	Greer, South Carolina
WCKW	1010 AM	Garyville, Louisiana
WCKY	1530 AM	Cincinnati
WCLA	1470 AM	Claxton, Georgia
WCLB	950 AM	Sheboygan, Wisconsin
WCLD	1490 AM	Cleveland, Mississippi
WCLE	1570 AM	Cleveland, Tennessee
WCLN	1170 AM	Clinton, North Carolina
WCLO	1230 AM	Janesville, Wisconsin
WCLT	1430 AM	Newark, Ohio
WCLU	1490 AM	Glasgow, Kentucky
WCLW	1130 AM	Eden, North Carolina
WCLY	1490 AM	Bridport, Vermont
WCMA	1600 AM	Bayamón, Puerto Rico
WCMC	1230 AM	Wildwood, New Jersey
WCMD	1230 AM	Cumberland, Maryland
WCME	900 AM	Brunswick, Maine
WCMI	1340 AM	Ashland, Kentucky
WCMN	1280 AM	Arecibo, Puerto Rico
WCMP	1350 AM	Pine City, Minnesota
WCMR	1270 AM	Elkhart, Indiana
WCMT	1410 AM	Martin, Tennessee
WCMX	1000 AM	Leominster, Massachusetts
WCMY	1430 AM	Ottawa, Illinois
WCNC	1240 AM	Elizabeth City, North Carolina
WCND	940 AM	Shelbyville, Kentucky
WCNL	1010 AM	Newport, New Hampshire
WCNN	680 AM	North Atlanta, Georgia
WCNZ	1660 AM	Marco Island, Florida
WCOA	1370 AM	Pensacola, Florida
WCOG	1320 AM	Greensboro, North Carolina
WCOJ	1420 AM	Coatesville, Pennsylvania
WCOK	1060 AM	Sparta, North Carolina
WCON	1450 AM	Cornelia, Georgia
WCOR	1490 AM	Lebanon, Tennessee
WCOS	1400 AM	Columbia, South Carolina
WCPA	900 AM	Clearfield, Pennsylvania
WCPC	940 AM	Houston, Mississippi
WCPH	1220 AM	Etowah, Tennessee
WCPK	1600 AM	Chesapeake, Virginia
WCPM	1280 AM	Cumberland, Kentucky
WCPR	1450 AM	Coamo, Puerto Rico
WCPS	760 AM	Tarboro, North Carolina
WCPT	820 AM	Willow Springs, Illinois
WCRA	1090 AM	Effingham, Illinois
WCRE	1420 AM	Cheraw, South Carolina
WCRK	1150 AM	Morristown, Tennessee
WCRL	1570 AM	Oneonta, Alabama
WCRN	830 AM	Worcester, Massachusetts
WCRO	1230 AM	Johnstown, Pennsylvania
WCRS	1450 AM	Greenwood, South Carolina
WCRT	1160 AM	Donelson, Tennessee
WCRU	960 AM	Dallas, North Carolina
WCRV	640 AM	Collierville, Tennessee
WCSI	1010 AM	Columbus, Indiana
WCSL	1590 AM	Cherryville, North Carolina
WCSM	1350 AM	Celina, Ohio
WCSR	1340 AM	Hillsdale, Michigan
WCSS	1490 AM	Amsterdam, New York
WCST	1010 AM	Berkeley Springs, West Virginia
WCSV	1490 AM	Crossville, Tennessee
WCSZ	1070 AM	Sans Souci, South Carolina
WCTC	1450 AM	New Brunswick, New Jersey
WCTF	1170 AM	Vernon, Connecticut
WCTN	950 AM	Potomac–Cabin John, Maryland
WCTR	1530 AM	Chestertown, Maryland
WCTS	1030 AM	Maplewood, Minnesota
WCTT	680 AM	Corbin, Kentucky
WCUB	980 AM	Two Rivers, Wisconsin
WCUE	1150 AM	Cuyahoga Falls, Ohio
WCVA	1490 AM	Culpeper, Virginia
WCVC	1330 AM	Tallahassee, Florida
WCVG	1320 AM	Covington, Kentucky
WCVL	1550 AM	Crawfordsville, Indiana
WCVP	600 AM	Murphy, North Carolina
WCVR	1320 AM	Randolph, Vermont
WCVX	1160 AM	Florence, Kentucky
WCWA	1230 AM	Toledo, Ohio
WCXI	1160 AM	Fenton, Michigan
WCXN	1170 AM	Claremont, North Carolina
WCXS	1480 AM	Arcadia, Florida
WCXZ	740 AM	Harrogate, Tennessee
WCYN	1400 AM	Cynthiana, Kentucky
WCZZ	1090 AM	Greenwood, South Carolina

== WD-- ==
Callsign	Frequency	City of license
WDAD	1450 AM	Indiana, Pennsylvania
WDAE	620 AM	St. Petersburg, Florida
WDAK	540 AM	Columbus, Georgia
WDAL	1430 AM	Dalton, Georgia
WDAN	1490 AM	Danville, Illinois
WDAO	1210 AM	Dayton, Ohio
WDAS	1480 AM	Philadelphia
WDAY	970 AM	Fargo, North Dakota
WDBC	680 AM	Escanaba, Michigan
WDBL	1590 AM	Springfield, Tennessee
WDBO	580 AM	Orlando, Florida
WDBQ	1490 AM	Dubuque, Iowa
WDBZ	1230 AM	Cincinnati
WDCF	1350 AM	Dade City, Florida
WDCT	1310 AM	Fairfax, Virginia
WDCX	990 AM	Rochester, New York
WDCY	1520 AM	Douglasville, Georgia
WDCZ	970 AM	Buffalo, New York
WDDO	980 AM	Perry, Georgia
WDEA	1370 AM	Ellsworth, Maine
WDEB	1500 AM	Jamestown, Tennessee
WDEH	800 AM	Sweetwater, Tennessee
WDEK	1170 AM	Lexington, South Carolina
WDEL	1150 AM	Wilmington, Delaware
WDEO	990 AM	Ypsilanti, Michigan
WDEP	1490 AM	Ponce, Puerto Rico
WDER	1320 AM	Derry, New Hampshire
WDEV	550 AM	Waterbury, Vermont
WDEX	1430 AM	Monroe, North Carolina
WDFB	1170 AM	Junction City, Kentucky
WDFN	1130 AM	Detroit, Michigan
WDGY	740 AM	Hudson, Wisconsin
WDHP	1620 AM	Frederiksted, United States Virgin Islands
WDIA	1070 AM	Memphis, Tennessee
WDIG	1450 AM	Dothan, Alabama
WDIZ	1320 AM	Venice, Florida
WDJA	1420 AM	Delray Beach, Florida
WDJL	1000 AM	Huntsville, Alabama
WDJO	1480 AM	Cincinnati
WDJS	1430 AM	Mount Olive, North Carolina
WDJZ	1590 AM	South Daytona, Florida
WDKN	1260 AM	Dickson, Tennessee
WDLA	1270 AM	Walton, New York
WDLB	1450 AM	Marshfield, Wisconsin
WDLC	1490 AM	Port Jervis, New York
WDLM	960 AM	East Moline, Illinois
WDLR	1270 AM	Marysville, Ohio
WDLS	900 AM	Wisconsin Dells, Wisconsin
WDLW	1380 AM	Lorain, Ohio
WDLX	930 AM	Washington, North Carolina
WDMC	920 AM	Melbourne, Florida
WDMG	860 AM	Douglas, Georgia
WDMJ	1320 AM	Marquette, Michigan
WDMV	700 AM	Walkersville, Maryland
WDNC	620 AM	Durham, North Carolina
WDNE	1240 AM	Elkins, West Virginia
WDNG	1450 AM	Anniston, Alabama
WDNO	960 AM	Quebradillas, Puerto Rico
WDNT	970 AM	Spring City, Tennessee
WDNY	1400 AM	Dansville, New York
WDOC	1310 AM	Prestonsburg, Kentucky
WDOE	1410 AM	Dunkirk, New York
WDON	1540 AM	Wheaton, Maryland
WDOR	910 AM	Sturgeon Bay, Wisconsin
WDOS	730 AM	Oneonta, New York
WDOV	1410 AM	Dover, Delaware
WDPC	1500 AM	Dallas, Georgia
WDPN	1310 AM	Alliance, Ohio
WDQN	1580 AM	Du Quoin, Illinois
WDRC	1360 AM	Hartford, Connecticut
WDRU	1030 AM	Creedmoor, North Carolina
WDSA	1320 AM	Dothan, Alabama
WDSC	800 AM	Dillon, South Carolina
WDSL	1520 AM	Mocksville, North Carolina
WDSM	710 AM	Superior, Wisconsin
WDSR	1340 AM	Lake City, Florida
WDTK	1400 AM	Detroit, Michigan
WDTM	1150 AM	Selmer, Tennessee
WDTW	1310 AM	Dearborn, Michigan
WDUL	970 AM	Superior, Wisconsin
WDUN	550 AM	Gainesville, Georgia
WDUR	1490 AM	Durham, North Carolina
WDUZ	1400 AM	Green Bay, Wisconsin
WDVA	1250 AM	Danville, Virginia
WDVH	980 AM	Gainesville, Florida
WDVM	1050 AM	Eau Claire, Wisconsin
WDWD	590 AM	Atlanta
WDWR	1230 AM	Pensacola, Florida
WDWS	1400 AM	Champaign, Illinois
WDXE	1370 AM	Lawrenceburg, Tennessee
WDXI	1310 AM	Jackson, Tennessee
WDXQ	1440 AM	Cochran, Georgia
WDXR	1450 AM	Paducah, Kentucky
WDXY	1240 AM	Sumter, South Carolina
WDYN	980 AM	Rossville, Georgia
WDYS	1480 AM	Somonauk, Illinois
WDYT	1220 AM	Kings Mountain, North Carolina
WDYZ	660 AM	Altamonte Springs, Florida
WDZ	1050 AM	Decatur, Illinois
WDZY	1290 AM	Colonial Heights, Virginia

== WE-- ==
Callsign	Frequency	City of license
WEAF	1130 AM	Camden, South Carolina
WEAL	1510 AM	Greensboro, North Carolina
WEAQ	1150 AM	Chippewa Falls, Wisconsin
WEAV	960 AM	Plattsburgh, New York
WEBC	560 AM	Duluth, Minnesota
WEBJ	1240 AM	Brewton, Alabama
WEBO	1330 AM	Owego, New York
WEBQ	1240 AM	Harrisburg, Illinois
WEBR	1440 AM	Niagara Falls, New York
WEBS	1030 AM	Calhoun, Georgia
WEBY	1330 AM	Milton, Florida
WECK	1230 AM	Cheektowaga, New York
WECO	940 AM	Wartburg, Tennessee
WECR	1130 AM	Newland, North Carolina
WECU	1570 AM	Winterville, North Carolina
WECZ	1540 AM	Punxsutawney, Pennsylvania
WEDI	1130 AM	Eaton, Ohio
WEDO	810 AM	McKeesport, Pennsylvania
WEEB	990 AM	Southern Pines, North Carolina
WEED	1390 AM	Rocky Mount, North Carolina
WEEF	1430 AM	Deerfield, Illinois
WEEI	850 AM	Boston, Massachusetts
WEEN	1460 AM	Lafayette, Tennessee
WEEU	830 AM	Reading, Pennsylvania
WEEX	1230 AM	Easton, Pennsylvania
WEFL	760 AM	Tequesta, Florida
WEGA	1350 AM	Vega Baja, Puerto Rico
WEGP	1390 AM	Presque Isle, Maine
WEIC	1270 AM	Charleston, Illinois
WEIR	1430 AM	Weirton, West Virginia
WEIS	990 AM	Centre, Alabama
WEJL	630 AM	Scranton, Pennsylvania
WEJS	1600 AM	Jersey Shore, Pennsylvania
WEKB	1460 AM	Elkhorn City, Kentucky
WEKG	810 AM	Jackson, Kentucky
WEKR	1240 AM	Fayetteville, Tennessee
WEKT	1070 AM	Elkton, Kentucky
WEKY	1340 AM	Richmond, Kentucky
WEKZ	1260 AM	Monroe, Wisconsin
WELC	1150 AM	Welch, West Virginia
WELD	690 AM	Fisher, West Virginia
WELE	1380 AM	Ormond Beach, Florida
WELI	960 AM	New Haven, Connecticut
WELM	1410 AM	Elmira, New York
WELO	580 AM	Tupelo, Mississippi
WELP	1360 AM	Easley, South Carolina
WELY	1450 AM	Ely, Minnesota
WELZ	1460 AM	Belzoni, Mississippi
WEMB	1420 AM	Erwin, Tennessee
WEMG	1310 AM	Camden, New Jersey
WEMJ	1490 AM	Laconia, New Hampshire
WENA	1330 AM	Yauco, Puerto Rico
WENC	1220 AM	Whiteville, North Carolina
WENE	1430 AM	Endicott, New York
WENG	1530 AM	Englewood, Florida
WENI	1450 AM	Corning, New York
WENK	1240 AM	Union City, Tennessee
WENN	1320 AM	Birmingham, Alabama
WENO	760 AM	Nashville, Tennessee
WENR	1090 AM	Englewood, Tennessee
WENT	1340 AM	Gloversville, New York
WENU	1410 AM	South Glens Falls, New York
WEOA	1400 AM	Evansville, Indiana
WEOK	1390 AM	Poughkeepsie, New York
WEOL	930 AM	Elyria, Ohio
WEPG	910 AM	South Pittsburg, Tennessee
WEPM	1340 AM	Martinsburg, West Virginia
WEPN	1050 AM	New York City
WERC	960 AM	Birmingham, Alabama
WERE	1490 AM	Cleveland Heights, Ohio
WERL	950 AM	Eagle River, Wisconsin
WERM	1220 AM	Fairhope, Alabama
WERT	1220 AM	Van Wert, Ohio
WESB	1490 AM	Bradford, Pennsylvania
WESC	660 AM	Greenville, South Carolina
WESO	970 AM	Southbridge, Massachusetts
WESR	1330 AM	Onley–Onancock, Virginia
WEST	1400 AM	Easton, Pennsylvania
WESX	1230 AM	Salem, Massachusetts
WESY	1580 AM	Leland, Mississippi
WETB	790 AM	Johnson City, Tennessee
WETC	540 AM	Wendell–Zebulon, North Carolina
WETR	760 AM	Knoxville, Tennessee
WETZ	1330 AM	New Martinsville, West Virginia
WEUP	1700 AM	Huntsville, Alabama
WEUR	1490 AM	Oak Park, Illinois
WEUV	1190 AM	Moulton, Alabama
WEVA	860 AM	Emporia, Virginia
WEVR	1550 AM	River Falls, Wisconsin
WEW	770 AM	St. Louis, Missouri
WEWC	1160 AM	Callahan, Florida
WEWO	1460 AM	Laurinburg, North Carolina
WEXS	610 AM	Patillas, Puerto Rico
WEXY	1520 AM	Wilton Manors, Florida
WEZE	590 AM	Boston, Massachusetts
WEZO	1230 AM	Augusta, Georgia
WEZR	780 AM	Rumford, Maine
WEZZ	970 AM	Canton, North Carolina

== WF-- ==
Callsign	Frequency	City of license
WFAB	890 AM	Ceiba, Puerto Rico
WFAM	1050 AM	Augusta, Georgia
WFAN	660 AM	New York City
WFAT	930 AM	Battle Creek, Michigan
WFAW	940 AM	Fort Atkinson, Wisconsin
WFAX	1220 AM	Falls Church, Virginia
WFAY	1230 AM	Fayetteville, North Carolina
WFBG	1290 AM	Altoona, Pennsylvania
WFBL	1390 AM	Syracuse, New York
WFBR	1590 AM	Glen Burnie, Maryland
WFCN	1200 AM	Nashville, Tennessee
WFCV	1090 AM	Fort Wayne, Indiana
WFDF	910 AM	Farmington Hills, Michigan
WFDL	1170 AM	Waupun, Wisconsin
WFDM	1400 AM	Ft. Walton Beach, Florida
WFDR	1370 AM	Manchester, Georgia
WFEA	1370 AM	Manchester, New Hampshire
WFEB	1340 AM	Sylacauga, Alabama
WFED	1500 AM	Washington, D.C.
WFER	1230 AM	Iron River, Michigan
WFFF	1360 AM	Columbia, Mississippi
WFFG	1300 AM	Marathon, Florida
WFGI	940 AM	Charleroi, Pennsylvania
WFGL	960 AM	Fitchburg, Massachusetts
WFGN	1180 AM	Gaffney, South Carolina
WFHK	1430 AM	Pell City, Alabama
WFHR	1320 AM	Wisconsin Rapids, Wisconsin
WFIA	900 AM	Louisville, Kentucky
WFIC	1530 AM	Collinsville, Virginia
WFIF	1500 AM	Milford, Connecticut
WFIL	560 AM	Philadelphia
WFIN	1330 AM	Findlay, Ohio
WFIR	960 AM	Roanoke, Virginia
WFIW	1390 AM	Fairfield, Illinois
WFJS	1260 AM	Trenton, New Jersey
WFJX	910 AM	Roanoke, Virginia
WFKJ	890 AM	Cashtown, Pennsylvania
WFKN	1220 AM	Franklin, Kentucky
WFLA	970 AM	Tampa, Florida
WFLF	540 AM	Pine Hills, Florida
WFLI	1070 AM	Lookout Mountain, Tennessee
WFLL	1400 AM	Fort Lauderdale, Florida
WFLO	870 AM	Farmville, Virginia
WFLR	1570 AM	Dundee, New York
WFLT	1420 AM	Flint, Michigan
WFLW	1360 AM	Monticello, Kentucky
WFMB	1450 AM	Springfield, Illinois
WFMC	730 AM	Goldsboro, North Carolina
WFMD	930 AM	Frederick, Maryland
WFME	1560 AM	New York City
WFMH	1340 AM	Cullman, Alabama
WFMO	860 AM	Fairmont, North Carolina
WFMV	620 AM	Cayce, South Carolina
WFMW	730 AM	Madisonville, Kentucky
WFNB	1130 AM	Brazil, Indiana
WFNC	640 AM	Fayetteville, North Carolina
WFNI	1070 AM	Indianapolis, Indiana
WFNN	1330 AM	Erie, Pennsylvania
WFNO	1540 AM	Gretna, Louisiana
WFNR	710 AM	Blacksburg, Virginia
WFNS	1350 AM	Blackshear, Georgia
WFNT	1470 AM	Flint, Michigan
WFNW	1380 AM	Naugatuck, Connecticut
WFNY	1440 AM	Gloversville, New York
WFOA	1230 AM	Baltimore, Maryland
WFOB	1430 AM	Fostoria, Ohio
WFOM	1230 AM	Marietta, Georgia
WFOR	1400 AM	Hattiesburg, Mississippi
WFOY	1240 AM	St. Augustine, Florida
WFPA	1400 AM	Fort Payne, Alabama
WFPB	1170 AM	Orleans, Massachusetts
WFPR	1400 AM	Hammond, Louisiana
WFQY	970 AM	Brandon, Mississippi
WFRA	1450 AM	Franklin, Pennsylvania
WFRB	560 AM	Frostburg, Maryland
WFRF	1070 AM	Tallahassee, Florida
WFRL	1570 AM	Freeport, Illinois
WFRM	600 AM	Coudersport, Pennsylvania
WFRX	1300 AM	West Frankfort, Illinois
WFSC	1050 AM	Franklin, North Carolina
WFSI	860 AM	Baltimore, Maryland
WFSP	1560 AM	Kingwood, West Virginia
WFSR	970 AM	Harlan, Kentucky
WFST	600 AM	Caribou, Maine
WFTD	1080 AM	Marietta, Georgia
WFTG	1400 AM	London, Kentucky
WFTL	850 AM	West Palm Beach, Florida
WFTM	1240 AM	Maysville, Kentucky
WFTN	1240 AM	Franklin, New Hampshire
WFTR	1450 AM	Front Royal, Virginia
WFTU	1570 AM	Riverhead, New York
WFTW	1260 AM	Fort Walton Beach, Florida
WFUN	970 AM	Ashtabula, Ohio
WFUR	1570 AM	Grand Rapids, Michigan
WFUZ	1240 AM	Wilkes-Barre, Pennsylvania
WFVA	1230 AM	Fredericksburg, Virginia
WFXJ	930 AM	Jacksonville, Florida
WFXN	1230 AM	Moline, Illinois
WFXO	1050 AM	Alexander City, Alabama
WFXY	1490 AM	Middlesboro, Kentucky
WFYC	1280 AM	Alma, Michigan
WFYL	1180 AM	King of Prussia, Pennsylvania
WFZX	1490 AM	Anniston, Alabama

== See also ==
- North American call sign
