= 1420 AM =

AM radio frequency

The following radio stations broadcast on AM frequency 1420 kHz: 1420 AM is a Regional broadcast frequency.

== Argentina ==
- LRI220 in Ciudad Autonoma de Buenos Aires

== Mexico ==
- XEEW-AM in Matamoros, Tamaulipas
- XEF-AM in Ciudad Juárez, Chihuahua
- XEH-AM in Monterrey, licensed in San Nicolás de los Garza, Nuevo León
- XEXX-AM in Tijuana, Baja California

== United States ==
| Call sign | City of license | Facility ID | Class | Daytime power (kW) | Nighttime power (kW) | Unlimited power (kW) | Transmitter coordinates |
|---|---|---|---|---|---|---|---|
| KBHS | Hot Springs, Arkansas | 48948 | D | 5 | 0.087 | | 34.455278°N 93.057222°W |
| KBTN | Neosho, Missouri | 33687 | B | 1 | 0.5 | | 36.847778°N 94.32°W |
| KGIM | Aberdeen, South Dakota | 1172 | B | 1 | 0.232 | | 45.486667°N 98.497222°W |
| KGNB | New Braunfels, Texas | 48378 | D | 1 | 0.196 | | 29.6625°N 98.174722°W |
| KIGO | St. Anthony, Idaho | 22622 | D | 32 | 0.012 | | 43.667222°N 111.870556°W |
| KITI | Centralia-Chehalis, Washington | 53398 | B | 5 | 5 | | 46.702222°N 122.932778°W |
| KJCK | Junction City, Kansas | 52798 | B | 1 | 0.5 | | 39.025833°N 96.81°W |
| KKEA | Honolulu, Hawaii | 34551 | B | | | 5 | 21.323889°N 157.879722°W |
| KMHS | Coos Bay, Oregon | 55243 | D | 1 | 0.041 | | 43.368611°N 124.203056°W |
| KMOG | Payson, Arizona | 21218 | D | 3 | | | 34.266667°N 111.315°W |
| KPEL | Lafayette, Louisiana | 12682 | B | 1 | 0.75 | | 30.277222°N 92.064167°W |
| KPIR | Granbury, Texas | 30195 | B | 0.5 | 0.5 | | 32.461944°N 97.788611°W |
| KPOC | Pocahontas, Arkansas | 59408 | D | 1 | 0.118 | | 36.277222°N 90.954444°W |
| KRIZ | Renton, Washington | 35549 | B | 1 | 0.5 | | 47.440278°N 122.2025°W |
| KRLL | California, Missouri | 67381 | D | 0.5 | 0.225 | | 38.636667°N 92.583333°W |
| KSTN | Stockton, California | 58838 | B | 5 | 3.5 | | 37.925556°N 121.245556°W |
| KTAN | Sierra Vista, Arizona | 23446 | B | 1.5 | 0.5 | | 31.546389°N 110.274722°W |
| KTJS | Hobart, Oklahoma | 22821 | B | 1 | 0.36 | | 35.049167°N 99.096667°W |
| KTOE | Mankato, Minnesota | 42899 | B | 5 | 5 | | 44.168333°N 93.910278°W |
| KUJ | Walla Walla, Washington | 35718 | B | 5 | 0.9 | | 46.067222°N 118.401389°W |
| KULY | Ulysses, Kansas | 198 | B | 1 | 0.5 | | 37.548056°N 101.363611°W |
| KWBF | Lubbock, Texas | 17589 | D | 0.5 | 0.14 | | 33.613611°N 101.875°W |
| KXCB | Omaha, Nebraska | 50307 | B | 1 | 0.33 | | 41.199722°N 95.909444°W |
| WACK | Newark, New York | 52123 | B | 5 | 0.5 | | 43.018889°N 77.078056°W |
| WACT | Tuscaloosa, Alabama | 48643 | D | 5 | 0.108 | | 33.175°N 87.555°W |
| WAMV | Amherst, Virginia | 12919 | D | 2.2 | 0.047 | | 37.539722°N 79.052778°W |
| WAOC | St. Augustine, Florida | 2706 | B | 2 | 0.23 | | 29.850278°N 81.330278°W |
| WASR | Wolfeboro, New Hampshire | 54889 | D | 0.5 | 0.136 | | 43.591944°N 71.219444°W |
| WBEC | Pittsfield, Massachusetts | 2714 | B | 1 | 1 | | 42.444444°N 73.278611°W |
| WBRD | Palmetto, Florida | 63985 | B | 2.5 | 1 | | 27.545°N 82.574444°W |
| WBSM | New Bedford, Massachusetts | 10452 | B | 5 | 1 | | 41.650556°N 70.916111°W |
| WCED | Du Bois, Pennsylvania | 67703 | D | 4.2 | 0.005 | | 41.140278°N 78.830556°W |
| WCOJ | Coatesville, Pennsylvania | 63593 | B | 5 | 5 | | 40.0225°N 75.814722°W |
| WCRE | Cheraw, South Carolina | 16405 | D | 1 | 0.097 | | 34.68°N 79.899444°W |
| WDJA | Delray Beach, Florida | 54038 | B | 5 | 0.5 | | 26.456111°N 80.099444°W |
| WEMB | Erwin, Tennessee | 70509 | D | 5 | 0.02 | | 36.116111°N 82.446944°W |
| WFLT | Flint, Michigan | 11025 | D | 0.5 | 0.142 | | 43.021944°N 83.643056°W |
| WGAS | South Gastonia, North Carolina | 39515 | D | 0.5 | 0.041 | | 35.182778°N 81.208333°W |
| WGXI | Plymouth, Wisconsin | 32846 | D | 0.5 | 0.062 | | 43.7425°N 87.939167°W |
| WHBN | Harrodsburg, Kentucky | 22084 | D | 1 | 0.046 | | 37.734167°N 84.813889°W |
| WHK | Cleveland, Ohio | 72299 | B | 5 | 5 | | 41.358333°N 81.6675°W |
| WIMS | Michigan City, Indiana | 39383 | B | 5 | 5 | | 41.677778°N 86.936111°W |
| WINI | Murphysboro, Illinois | 54817 | D | 0.42 | 0.053 | | 37.757222°N 89.233333°W |
| WKAF | Saint Albans, Vermont | 34812 | D | 1 | 0.107 | | 44.831111°N 73.090278°W |
| WKCW | Warrenton, Virginia | 73190 | D | 22 | 0.06 | | 38.731111°N 77.778333°W |
| WKSR | Pulaski, Tennessee | 53874 | D | 1 | 0.06 | | 35.199722°N 87.075278°W |
| WKWN | Trenton, Georgia | 54444 | D | 2.5 | 0.112 | | 34.861944°N 85.499722°W |
| WLIS | Old Saybrook, Connecticut | 16418 | B | 5 | 0.5 | | 41.327222°N 72.389167°W |
| WLNA | Peekskill, New York | 54852 | B | 5 | 1 | | 41.308611°N 73.916667°W |
| WMYN | Mayodan, North Carolina | 40794 | D | 1 | 0.068 | | 36.415°N 79.987222°W |
| WNRS | Herkimer, New York | 2760 | D | 1 | 0.064 | | 43.061111°N 75.028889°W |
| WOC | Davenport, Iowa | 60360 | B | 5 | 5 | | 41.55°N 90.476944°W |
| WPEH | Louisville, Georgia | 52030 | D | 1 | 0.159 | | 33.013333°N 82.3925°W |
| WRCG | Columbus, Georgia | 72090 | D | 5 | 0.086 | | 32.465°N 85.022778°W |
| WUKQ | Ponce, Puerto Rico | 9352 | B | | | 1 | 17.989722°N 66.6225°W |
| WVJS | Owensboro, Kentucky | 51071 | D | 0.98 | 0.02 | | 37.775°N 87.158889°W |
| WWSZ | Decatur, Georgia | 14745 | D | 1 | 0.051 | | 33.786944°N 84.248056°W |
| WXGM | Gloucester, Virginia | 74208 | D | 0.74 | 0.058 | | 37.41°N 76.547778°W |
| WZWB | Kenova, West Virginia | 14377 | B | 5 | 0.5 | | 38.411667°N 82.603611°W |
