= WCLN =

WCLN may refer to:

- WCLN (AM), a radio station (1170 AM) licensed to serve Clinton, North Carolina, United States
- WCLN-FM, a radio station (105.7 FM) licensed to serve Rennert, North Carolina
- WKFV, a radio station (107.3 FM) licensed to serve Clinton, North Carolina, which held the call sign WCLN-FM from 1984 to 1991 and from 1994 to 2017
