= WKRP (disambiguation) =

WKRP in Cincinnati is an American TV series.

The New WKRP in Cincinnati is a syndicated sequel series to the original.

WKRP, a callsign, may also refer to:

== Radio stations ==
- WKRP-FM, a radio station in Mason, Ohio, (97.7 FM) rebranded as "WKRP The Oasis"
- WKRP-LP, a low-power radio station (101.9 FM) licensed to serve Raleigh, North Carolina, United States
- WJCP, a radio station (1460 AM) licensed to serve North Vernon, Indiana, United States, which held the call sign WKRP from 1989 to 1997
- WDPC 1500, Atlanta, Georgia, which was WKRP from its initial sign-on in 1979 until becoming WDPC in 1989
- KMRI, Salt Lake City, Utah, branded "W KRPN Salt Lake City" in the 1980s

== Television stations ==
- WBQC-LD, Cincinnati, Ohio, formerly branded "WKRP-TV Cincinnati" from 2008 to 2023
- WLPX-TV, Charleston, West Virginia, designated WKRP-TV from 1988 to 1998
- WRTN-LP, Nashville, Tennessee, which held the call sign WKRP-LP in 2005 to 2009
- WDDN-LD, Washington, D.C., known as WKRP-LP from 1998 to 2005
