= WCEH =

WCEH may refer to:

- WCEH (AM), a radio station (610 AM) licensed to serve Hawkinsville, Georgia, United States
- WCEH-FM, a radio station (98.3 FM) licensed to serve Pinehurst, Georgia
