= WQXZ =

WQXZ may refer to:

- WGLH, a radio station (103.9 FM) licensed to serve Hawkinsville, Georgia, United States, which held the call sign WQXZ from 2008 to 2020
- WCEH-FM, a radio station (98.3 FM) licensed to serve Pinehurst, Georgia, which held the call sign WQXZ from 2003 to 2008
- WACB, a radio station (860 AM) licensed to serve Taylorsville, North Carolina, United States, which held the call sign WQXZ from 1978 to 1993
