= WFTL (disambiguation) =

WFTL is a radio station in West Palm Beach, Florida, United States.

WFTL may also refer to

- WFTL (1400 AM) in Fort Lauderdale, Florida, now WFLL
- WFTL (1420 AM) in Delray Beach, Florida, now WDJA
- WFTL-FM (106.7) in Fort Lauderdale, Florida, now WXDJ
- WFTL-TV (channel 23) in Fort Lauderdale, Florida, later known as WGBS-TV
