= WABA =

WABA may refer to:

- Waba or SuperWaba, a simplified version of Java aimed at portable devices
- WABA (AM), a radio station (850 AM) licensed to Aguadilla, Puerto Rico
- Washington Area Bicyclist Association helped establish Metropolitan Branch Trail
- West Asian Basketball Championship
- Women's American Basketball Association, 2017–
- Women's American Basketball Association, 1984
- World Alliance for Breastfeeding Action
- Worldwide Aquatic Bodywork Association
