= WCLN-FM =

- Rennert, North Carolina; United States
- Broadcast area: Fayetteville; Elizabethtown; Lumberton, North Carolina
- Branding: Christian 105.7

Programming
- Format: Contemporary Christian music

Ownership
- Owner: Grander Vision Media, LLC

History
- First air date: 1990
- Former call signs: WSAD (1989); WGQR (1989–2017)

Technical information
- Licensing authority: FCC
- Facility ID: 60881
- Class: C3
- ERP: 25,000 watts
- HAAT: 177.7 meters (583 ft)

Links
- Public license information: Public file; LMS
- Website: WCLN

WCLN-FM (105.7 FM) is a radio station broadcasting a contemporary Christian music format. Licensed to Rennert, North Carolina, United States, it serves the greater Fayetteville, North Carolina area. The station is currently owned by Grander Vision Media, LLC.

== History ==
WCLN-FM signed on in 1990 as WGQR with an oldies format and was known as "Solid Gold 105.7".

In 1993, Sound Business, which was 50 percent owned by Arthur DeBerry and Associates, owned WGQR and WBLA. Lee Hauser, who owned the other 50 percent of Sound Business and served as its president, began managing WJSK and WAGR in Lumberton, North Carolina, when the DeBerry company bought those stations. Morning host Dan Hester, who had worked at WWAY, replaced Hauser as station manager for WGQR and WBLA. WGQR and WBLA both aired the Bladen County high school football game of the week.

In 2004, Beasley Broadcasting tried to buy the stations, but the Federal Communications Commission (FCC) disallowed the purchase because Beasley would own too many stations in the market.

On January 11, 2006, the sale of WGQR and WBLA to Christian Listening Network, owner of WCLN and WCLN-FM was completed. WGQR switched to a southern gospel format.

On December 15, 2017, Grander Vision Media, owned by longtime WCLN and WGQR general manager Dan DeBruler and wife Dorothy, purchased the license for 105.7 FM from Christian Listening Network, Inc. The call letters WGQR were surrendered and changed to WCLN-FM in a single FCC action.
