= WATV =

WATV may refer to:

- WATV (AM), a radio station (900 AM) licensed to Birmingham, Alabama, United States
- WATV-LD, a television station (channel 6, virtual 47) licensed to Orlando, Florida, United States
- WNET-TV, a station in New York City that carried the call letters "WATV" from 1948 to 1958
