= WJQI =

WJQI may refer to:

- WQEZ, a radio station (1370 AM) licensed to Fort Campbell, Kentucky, which held the call sign WJQI from 2005 to 2009
- WCPK, a radio station (1600 AM) licensed to Chesapeake, Virginia, which held the call sign WJQI from 1987 to 1996
- WPTE, a radio station (94.9 FM) licensed to Virginia Beach, Virginia, which held the call sign WJQI from 1987 to 1996
