= WDMC =

WDMC may refer to:

- WDMC (AM), a radio station (920 AM) licensed to Melbourne, Florida, United States
- WDMC-LD, a low-power television station (channel 20, virtual 25) licensed to Charlotte, North Carolina, United States
- Walt Disney Masterpiece Collection, a VHS line of The Walt Disney Company from 1994 to 1999
