= WJCP =

- North Vernon, Indiana; United States
- Broadcast area: Vernon, Indiana; Jennings County, Indiana
- Frequency: 1460 kHz
- Branding: Classic Hits 97.7 and 1460 WJCP

Programming
- Format: Full-service; Classic hits
- Affiliations: Brownfield Ag News; USA Radio News

Ownership
- Owner: Keith Reising; (Jennings County Promotion Partners, LLC)

History
- First air date: January 8, 1955
- Former call signs: WOCH (1955–1984); WINN (1984–1988); WNVI (1988–1989, 1997–2006); WKRP (1989–1997)
- Call sign meaning: Jennings County Panthers

Technical information
- Licensing authority: FCC
- Facility ID: 61196
- Class: D
- Power: 1,000 watts (day); 92 watts (night)
- Transmitter coordinates: 38°59′51.9″N 85°38′48.2″W
- Translator: 97.7 W249DG (North Vernon)

Links
- Public license information: Public file; LMS
- Webcast: Listen live
- Website: wjcpradio.com

WJCP is a full-service classic hits-formatted broadcast radio station licensed to North Vernon, Indiana, serving Vernon and Jennings County, Indiana. WJCP is owned and operated by Keith Reising, through licensee Jennings County Promotion Partners, LLC.

== History ==
WJCP was launched on January 8, 1955, as WOCH by Dorrell Ochs. Located in the Ochs' family auto supply business in North Vernon, the station was started with the intent of keeping the local community informed and entertained, while broadcasting Christian programming.

Eventually, the station was bought ARS Broadcasting Corporation and carried a middle of the road (MOR) format. At the time, the station carried the WNVI callsign. WNVI changed its callsign to WKRP on August 17, 1989, and back to WNVI on August 8, 1997. Findlay Publishing Company purchased WNVI and its then FM sister-stations WRBI and WWWY for $1.9 million in 1997. For a time, after the sale, WNVI carried a talk format, simulcasting then sister-station WCSI.

Findlay Publishing Company sold WNVI, in a swap for WWWY, to Pieratt Communications, Inc. on November 20, 2001. With the sale, the simulcast was WCSI ended and WNVI switched to Adult Standards. In 2003, the station flipped to ESPN Radio-affiliated sports branded as "ESPN 1460".

On May 15, 2006, WNVI became WJCP with its callsign standing for Jennings County Panthers, the latter derived from the county high school's mascot. WJCP was sold to Tom and Diana Taylor on October 17, 2014. WJCP added FM translator W249DG, broadcasting on 97.7 FM, on May 9, 2016. The translator simulcasts WJCP's AM signal on the FM band.

Effective October 10, 2019, Tom and Diana Taylor sold WJCP and translator W249DG to Keith Reising's Jennings County Promotion Partners, LLC for $115,000.

== Translator ==
In addition to the main station, WJCP is relayed by an FM translator to widen its broadcast area. Translator W249DG was originally owned by Greenfield, Indiana-based Indiana Community Radio Corporation. It was subsequently sold as part of a package of stations and translators to New Beginnings Movement, Inc., and then acquired by WJCP owners Tom and Diana Taylor effective June 29, 2018.

Call sign	Frequency	City of license	FID	ERP (W)	HAAT	Class	FCC info
W249DG	97.7 FM	North Vernon, Indiana	141722	250	57 m (187 ft)	D	LMS
