= WVMG =

WVMG may refer to:

- WVMG-LP, a low-power radio station (101.1 FM) licensed to serve Chattanooga, Tennessee, United States
- WWHX, a radio station (100.7 FM) licensed to serve Normal, Illinois, United States, which held the call sign WVMG from 2005 to 2012
- WMGA, a radio station (97.9 FM) licensed to serve Kenova, West Virginia, United States, which held the call sign WVMG in 2005
- WDXQ, a radio station (1440 AM) licensed to serve Cochran, Georgia, United States, which held the call sign WVMG from 1965 to 2005
- WRWR (FM), a radio station (107.5 FM) licensed to serve Cochran, Georgia, which held the call sign WVMG-FM until 2005
