= WSSY =

WSSY may refer to:

- WSSY-LP, a low-power radio station (107.9 FM) licensed to serve Greensboro, North Carolina, United States
- WCEH-FM, a radio station (98.3 FM) licensed to serve Pinehurst, Georgia, United States, which held the call sign WSSY from 2008 to 2013
