= WMEL =

WMEL may refer to:

- WMEL-LD, a low-power television station (channel 13) licensed to serve Grenada, Mississippi, United States
- WKQK, a radio station (1300 AM) licensed to serve Cocoa Beach, Florida, United States, which held the call sign WMEL from 2008 to 2016
- WDMC (AM), a radio station (920 AM) licensed to serve Melbourne, Florida, which held the call sign WMEL from 1972 to 2008
- WWBC, a radio station (1510 AM) in Cocoa, Florida, once branded as WMEL
