= KRLL =

KRLL may refer to:

- KRLL (AM), a radio station (1420 AM) licensed to serve California, Missouri, United States
- KRLL-FM, a radio station (93.9 FM) licensed to serve Circle, Alaska, United States; see List of radio stations in Alaska
- KVMX-FM, a radio station (92.1 FM) licensed to serve Placerville, California, United States, which held the call sign KRLL in 2004
- KIVA (AM), a radio station (1600 AM) licensed to serve Albuquerque, New Mexico, United States, which held the call sign KRLL from 1993 to 1995
