= WBCR =

WBCR may refer to:

- WBCR (AM), a radio station (1470 AM) licensed to Alcoa, Tennessee, United States
- WBCR-FM, a radio station (90.3 FM) licensed to Beloit, Wisconsin, United States
- WBCR-LP, a low-power radio station (97.7 FM) licensed to Great Barrington, Massachusetts, United States
- Wabash Central Railroad
