= WBLA (disambiguation) =

WBLA is a radio station in North Carolina. It may also refer to:

- FIBA women's continental club competitions:
  - Women's Basketball League Africa
  - Women's Basketball League Americas
  - Women's Basketball League Asia
