= WLSQ =

WLSQ may refer to:

- WLSQ (AM), a radio station (1240 AM) licensed to serve Loris, South Carolina, United States
- WIHG, a radio station (105.7 FM) licensed to serve Rockwood, Tennessee, United States, which held the call sign WLSQ in 2007
- WTJF-FM, a radio station (94.3 FM) licensed to serve Dyer, Tennessee, which held the call sign WLSQ from 1995 to 2006
- WDAL, a radio station (1430 AM) licensed to serve Dalton, Georgia, United States, which held the call sign WLSQ from 1987 to 1995
- WZKD, a radio station (950 AM) licensed to serve Montgomery, Alabama, United States, which held the call sign WLSQ from 1977 to 1987
