= WDCO =

WDCO may refer to:

- WDCO-CD, a digital class-A television station (channel 24, virtual channel 10.1) licensed to serve Woodstock, Virginia and transmitting from The Plains, Virginia
- WOWZ-LD, a low-power television station (channel 33) licensed to serve Salisbury, Maryland, which held the call sign WDCO-LP from 2010 to 2017
- WDXQ, a radio station (1440 AM) licensed to Cochran, Georgia, United States, which held the call sign WDCO from 2007 to 2010
- WMUM-FM, a radio station (89.7 FM) licensed to Cochran, Georgia, United States, which held the call sign WDCO-FM from 1983 to 2006
- WMUM-TV, a television station (channel 7) licensed to Cochran, Georgia, United States, which held the call signs WDCO or WDCO-TV until 2006
