= WOWF =

- Crossville, Tennessee; United States
- Frequency: 102.5 MHz
- Branding: 102.5 WOW Country

Programming
- Format: Country
- Affiliations: Fox News Radio; Westwood One

Ownership
- Owner: Main Street Media, LLC
- Sister stations: WPBX, WAEW, WCSV

History
- Former call signs: WEGE (1990–1996); WSWJ (1996)

Technical information
- Licensing authority: FCC
- Facility ID: 46369
- Class: C3
- ERP: 9,000 watts
- HAAT: 165.1 meters (542 ft)
- Transmitter coordinates: 36°1′18.00″N 84°58′18.00″W

Links
- Public license information: Public file; LMS
- Website: 1025wowcountry.com

WOWF (102.5 FM, "102.5 WOW Country") is a radio station broadcasting a country music format. Licensed to Crossville, Tennessee, United States, the station is currently owned by Main Street Media, LLC and features programming from Fox News Radio and Westwood One.

Logo under previous colors
