= WPBX =

- Crossville, Tennessee; United States
- Frequency: 99.3 MHz
- Branding: Mix 99.3

Programming
- Format: Adult contemporary
- Affiliations: Compass Media Networks; United Stations Radio Networks

Ownership
- Owner: Main Street Media, LLC
- Sister stations: WAEW, WCSV, WOWF

History
- First air date: May 12, 1967 (as WAEW-FM)
- Former call signs: WAEW-FM (1967–1980); WXVL (1980–2003)

Technical information
- Licensing authority: FCC
- Facility ID: 14618
- Class: A
- ERP: 1,400 watts
- HAAT: 174.3 meters (572 ft)
- Transmitter coordinates: 36°1′18.00″N 84°58′18.00″W

Links
- Public license information: Public file; LMS
- Webcast: Listen Live
- Website: mix993.net

WPBX (99.3 FM, "Mix 99.3") is a radio station broadcasting an adult contemporary music format. Licensed to Crossville, Tennessee, United States, the station is currently owned by Main Street Media, LLC and features programming from Compass Media Networks and United Stations Radio Networks.

The station formerly broadcast under the call signs of WXVL and WAEW-FM.
