= WKKG =

- Columbus, Indiana; United States
- Broadcast area: South-Central Indiana
- Frequency: 101.5 MHz
- Branding: Indiana Country 101.5 WKKG

Programming
- Format: Country

Ownership
- Owner: White River Broadcasting Co. Inc.

History
- First air date: 1958; 68 years ago

Technical information
- Licensing authority: FCC
- Facility ID: 72259
- Class: B
- ERP: 50,000 watts
- HAAT: 150 meters (490 ft)
- Transmitter coordinates: 39°11′12.00″N 85°57′0.00″W

Links
- Public license information: Public file; LMS
- Webcast: Listen live
- Website: wkkg.com

WKKG (101.5 FM, "Indiana Country 101.5 WKKG") is a commercial FM radio station broadcasting a country music radio format. Licensed to Columbus, Indiana, the station serves the South-Central Indiana area. It is owned by White River Broadcasting Co. Inc.

== History ==
In 1958, the station signed on as WCSI-FM, the sister station to WCSI 1010 AM. WCSI-FM was powered at 20,000 watts, less than half its current output. The two stations largely simulcast their programming. By the early 1980s, WCSI and WCSI-FM were airing separate programming.

It became WKKG-FM in 1983. The transmitter effective radiated power (ERP) was increased to 50,000 watts in 1987.
