= WKTG =

- Madisonville, Kentucky; United States
- Broadcast area: Owensboro, Kentucky
- Frequency: 93.9 MHz (HD Radio)
- Branding: 93.9 KTG ROCKS

Programming
- Format: Mainstream Rock
- Subchannels: HD2: Adult hits "Mad Mix 106"; HD3: Classic hits "The Drive 95"
- Affiliations: United Stations Radio Networks; Westwood One

Ownership
- Owner: Ham Broadcasting, Inc.
- Sister stations: WFMW

History
- First air date: April 19, 1949

Technical information
- Licensing authority: FCC
- Facility ID: 60877
- Class: C2
- ERP: 35,000 watts
- HAAT: 178 meters (584 ft)
- Transmitter coordinates: 37°31′25″N 87°24′11″W
- Repeaters: 105.9 W290CR (Madisonville, relays HD2); 94.9 W235AC (Madisonville, relays HD3)

Links
- Public license information: Public file; LMS
- Webcast: Listen Live; Listen Live (HD2)
- Website: ktgrocks.com madmix106.com (HD2)

WKTG (93.9 FM) is a radio station broadcasting a Mainstream Rock format. Licensed to Madisonville, Kentucky, United States, the station serves the Owensboro area. The station is currently owned by Ham Broadcasting, Inc. and features programming from United Stations Radio Networks and Westwood One.

== History ==
The station signed on the air at 103.1 megacycles on April 19, 1949 (coinciding with Easter Sunday of that year) as Kentucky's first-ever FM-exclusive radio station. The station was under ownership of the Madisonville Messenger newspaper under license name Messenger Broadcasting Company. The station was broadcasting solo until the 1950 acquisition of WCIF, which changed their callsign to match the FM station, which would change frequencies to 93.9 megacycles shortly after.

In 1962, both the radio stations and the newspaper were purchased by Elmer Kelley and Hubert M. Wells, who had been part of the station's management since the WFMW/WCIF merger; Kelley became the sole owner of the station in 1970. WFMW-AM simulcast the FM programming until 1978, when the FM station changed the callsign to WKTG and became a classic rock station. Fifteen years later, WKTG increased their transmitter power to 50,000 watts.

WKTG remained in the hands of the original owners until being sold to various companies, including Sound Telecasters, Inc. Sound Telecasters sold WFMW and WKTG in June 2024 to Cadiz, Kentucky-based Ham Broadcasting, Inc. for a reported price of $815,000. Once the sale is finalized, Ham Broadcasting will take over operation of both stations, beginning July 1.

== HD Radio ==
In addition to its primary signal, WKTG also broadcasts an HD Radio signal that comes with an HD2 subchannel that broadcasts an adult contemporary format as Mad Mix 106, which is simulcast through analog FM translator W290CR (105.9 MHz) in Madisonville.
