= WNEA =

- Newnan, Georgia; United States
- Broadcast area: Atlanta metropolitan area
- Frequency: 1300 kHz

Programming
- Format: Christian talk and teaching

Ownership
- Owner: Word Christian Broadcasting, Inc.
- Sister stations: WDCY, WDPC

History
- First air date: April 18, 1962

Technical information
- Licensing authority: FCC
- Facility ID: 73317
- Class: D
- Power: 1,000 watts day 50 watts night
- Transmitter coordinates: 33°22′31.00″N 84°47′8.00″W
- Translator: (104.9 MHz) W285FV (Newnan))

Links
- Public license information: Public file; LMS
- Website: WordChristianBroadcasting.com

WNEA (1300 kHz) is an AM Christian radio station broadcasting a Christian talk and teaching radio format. It is licensed to Newnan, Georgia, and serves the Atlanta metropolitan area. The station is owned by Word Christian Broadcasting Inc. Much of the programming is simulcast with co-owned 1500 WDCY in Douglasville, Georgia and 1500 WDPC in Dallas, Georgia.

WNEA is a Class D radio station. By day, it transmits with 1,000 watts, but to avoid interfering with other stations on AM 1300, at night it drops its power to 50 watts. It uses a non-directional antenna. It originally signed on the air on April 18, 1962.

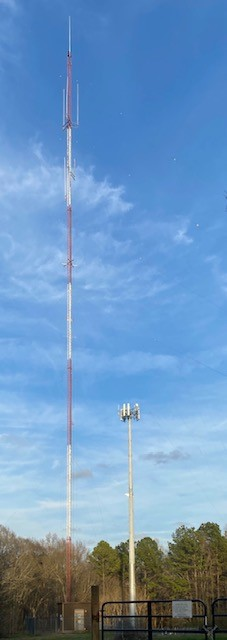
WNEA Antenna Tower (Taller structure with shorter cell tower mast adjacent) as seen from Roberts Rd. in Newnan, Georgia.
