= The Rock Radio Network =

Radio station in San Juan, Puerto Rico

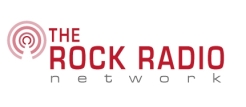
- San Juan, Puerto Rico; Puerto Rico
- Broadcast area: Puerto Rico, Virgin Islands, and Lesser Antilles
- Frequencies: 1190 kHz (WBMJ); 1060 kHz (WCGB); 1370 kHz (WIVV); 99.5 MHz (W258DT); 103.9 MHz (W280GC); 106.5 MHz (W293DP)
- Branding: Christian teaching

Programming
- Format: Religious
- Affiliations: Salem Radio Network

Ownership
- Owner: Calvary Evangelistic Mission, Inc.
- Sister stations: WBMJ, WIVV, WCGB

Technical information
- Power: 20,000 combined watts

Links
- Website: therockradio.org

The Rock Radio Network is a 3-station AM and 3-FM-translator radio network out of San Juan, Puerto Rico. It broadcasts Christian biblical teaching in a bilingual format. The Rock consists of the stations WBMJ/W258DT in San Juan, WIVV/W280GC in Vieques, and WCGB/W293DP in Juana Díaz, Puerto Rico. The Rock is owned and operated by Calvary Evangelistic Mission, Inc.

== History ==
WIVV Days

The Rock Radio Network began as the missionary radio station WIVV (AM 1370). In 1952, the missionary couple Don and Ruth Luttrell moved to Vieques, Puerto Rico. Don Luttrell was a pioneer missionary pilot and evangelist. When they arrived, their main purpose was to evangelize by means of rallies and Bible study courses. As time passed, the Luttrells felt the need for a more effective tool that could reach the Caribbean more quickly. In 1956, they started what became the first full-time Christian radio station in Puerto Rico. It was named WIVV, or "West Indies Voice of Victory," because its intended coverage area included the West Indies and Lesser Antilles. WIVV broadcast a mixture of prerecorded Bible teaching from the USA and local sources, along with music, news, and weather reports. In time, WIVV and its associated ministries consolidated into what became known as Calvary Evangelistic Mission.

WBMJ
The Rock Radio Network

WBMJ (AM 1190) was founded in the 1960s by the comedian and musician Bob Hope. In its early years, WBMJ was a secular music station. Passing through different hands and managements, it eventually rose to become one of the top rock-music stations in the island of Puerto Rico. To its fans, WBMJ was known affectionately as "The Rock." In 1985, WBMJ passed into the hands of Calvary Evangelistic Mission. Shortly thereafter, its programming changed to an all-Christian teaching format with a mixture of live and prerecorded material similar to was what already broadcasting on WIVV. With two radio stations, Calvary Evangelistic Mission made the decision to broadcast mostly from WBMJ and to combine the two stations into one radio network. After an on-air contest to adopt a new name, listeners chose the moniker "The Rock" for the new network. The name became a bridge from WBMJ's history as a rock station and Jesus Christ's claim of himself as the Rock in Matthew 16:18.

WCGB

WCGB (AM 1060) was founded in 1967 by Grace Broadcasters, Inc. The station was built in Juana Díaz. WCGB was an all-Spanish station with a Christian emphasis, but slightly secular in programming. For example, the station covered local sports, news, and politics, and it aired secular music. Yet the management also made sure that every hour of programming contained something with a religious context. For many years, the management of The Rock had desired to reach the Western side of Puerto Rico and Ponce. In 2004, Grace Broadcasters sold WCGB to Calvary Evangelistic Mission. When WCGB joined The Rock, its programming changed to a bilingual teaching format almost identical to what was already airing on WIVV and WBMJ. Most of the programming today on WCGB originates from The Rock's main studios in San Juan. However, WCGB retains a four-hour bloc of its own programming every weekday morning between the hours of 9 AM to 1 PM. This programming can be listened to live on a separate live stream through the Network's website.

== The Rock Today ==
Today, The Rock Radio Network is the only bilingual radio network in Puerto Rico. Its programming is split between English during the morning and daytime, and Spanish during the evening hours. The Rock airs a mixture of Christian teaching and family-centered programs, along with Christian music and Salem Radio Network Satellite News. It airs a combination of well-known Christian figures such as Tony Evans (The Urban Alternative), Charles Stanley (In Touch), Luis Palau, and Nancy Leigh DeMoss (Revive Our Hearts). Also, The Rock actively seeks local program producers in English and in Spanish that meet its stated purpose. These programs include the live Saturday-night Spanish program "Pulpito Reformado" with Pastor Carlos Cruz Moya, and the English program "Comfort Ye My People" with local pastor Jason Dennett, among many others. With this mix of programming, the network serves Puerto Ricans that speak Spanish as a first language, as well as the large community of Puerto Ricans who are fluently bilingual. In addition, The Rock touches the strong presence of English-speaking Americans, Europeans, and other ethnic groups that live and vacation in Puerto Rico. WIVV serves the US and British Virgin Islands, which are primarily English speaking.

The Rock has been upgrading its studio and transmitter facilities. 2007 saw a new transmitter for WCGB and a new WinJock automation system at the hub in San Juan. In 2008, The Rock was just finishing an ambitious overhaul of WIVV, with a new transmitter and a new building on Vieques. Recently, The Rock added all-Spanish programming Saturday nights. The Network also expanded its weekday Spanish programming from 12:00 midnight to 1:30 a.m. In 2020 - 2021, The Rock began broadcasting on the FM dial, growing to three FM repeater frequencies by early 2022. The repeaters broadcast the same programming as their respective stations.

In addition, The Rock makes all its local programming available for free download through the Media Center on its website. In 2016 the ministry launched a mobile app for the Android and iOS platforms that contains all the Media Center content, as well as the live streams. The Rock has increased its web presence through podcasting on platforms like iTunes and through making web-exclusive content to complement its on-air programming.

== Funding ==
The Rock Radio Network is a division of Calvary Evangelistic Mission, Inc. (CEM), which is a 501(c)(3) IRS registered nonprofit. The Rock is also supported by donations, which come in several ways. First, some of the program support the costs associated with their airtime. CEM accepts donations from listeners, friends, outside groups like churches and businesses, and estates. The Rock holds an annual "Sharathon" fundraiser, which supplies a small portion of the annual budget.
