= WIVV =

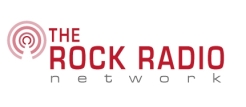
- Vieques, Puerto Rico; Puerto Rico
- Broadcast area: Puerto Rico; United States Virgin Islands; British Virgin Islands; Spanish Virgin Islands
- Frequency: 1370 kHz
- Branding: The Rock Radio Network

Programming
- Format: Religious
- Affiliations: Salem Radio Network

Ownership
- Owner: Calvary Evangelistic Mission, Inc.
- Sister stations: WBMJ, WCGB

History
- First air date: 1956
- Call sign meaning: West Indies Voice of Victory

Technical information
- Licensing authority: FCC
- Facility ID: 8392
- Class: B
- Power: 5,000 watts day 1,000 watts night
- Transmitter coordinates: 18°6′6″N 65°28′15″W
- Translator: 103.9 W280GC (Vieques)

Links
- Public license information: Public file; LMS
- Website: rockradionetwork.org

WIVV (1370 AM) is a radio station broadcasting a Religious format. Licensed to Vieques, Puerto Rico, it serves part of Puerto Rico, large areas of the United States Virgin Islands, the British Virgin Islands, and the Spanish Virgin Islands. WIVV was the first-ever full-time Christian radio station in the Caribbean. It is currently owned by Calvary Evangelistic Mission, Inc. and features programming from Salem Radio Network.

WIVV is one of three AM radio stations that comprise The Rock Radio Network. The station has its own standalone studio facilities in Vieques. However, most of its programming originates from the main hub of The Rock Radio Network at WBMJ in San Juan, Puerto Rico. Its programming is bilingual and consists largely of biblical teaching in English and in Spanish. WIVV also broadcasts a limited amount of Christian music.

WIVV first went on the air in 1956. It was founded as a missionary outreach station through the work of the American missionaries Don and Ruth Luttrell. They inaugurated the station by airing Handel's "Hallelujah Chorus." In honor of this, The Rock Radio Network ends every "Sharathon" fundraising event with the "Hallelujah Chorus" and prayer. For more on the history of WIVV, see The Rock Radio Network.

== Changes to WIVV ==
In 2008, The Rock Radio Network was in the final stages of a complete renovation of the studio facilities of WIVV. 2008 saw a brand new transmitter, a new studio building, and plans for a new tower. The old studio building was emptied and prepared to be converted into a garage. For more information on WIVV, see The Rock Radio Network.

== Translator stations ==
Broadcast translator for WIVV
Call sign	Frequency	City of license	FID	ERP (W)	FCC info
W280GC	103.9 FM	Vieques, Puerto Rico	202947	215 vertical	LMS
