= WCSV =

- Crossville, Tennessee; United States
- Frequency: 1490 kHz
- Branding: 97.7 The One

Programming
- Format: Christian adult contemporary

Ownership
- Owner: Main Street Media, LLC
- Sister stations: WAEW, WOWF, WPBX

History
- First air date: June 15, 1968
- Call sign meaning: CrosSVille

Technical information
- Licensing authority: FCC
- Facility ID: 58781
- Class: C
- Power: 1,000 watts (unlimited)
- Transmitter coordinates: 35°57′1.00″N 85°2′9.00″W
- Translator: 97.7 W249DA (Crossville)

Links
- Public license information: Public file; LMS
- Website: 977theone.com

WCSV (1490 AM, "97.7 The One") is a radio station broadcasting a Christian adult contemporary music format. Licensed to Crossville, Tennessee, United States, the station is currently owned by Main Street Media, LLC.

On December 26, 2025, WCSV changed their format from sports to Christian adult contemporary, branded as "97.7 The One".
