= WADE (AM) =

Radio station in North Carolina, US

- Wadesboro, North Carolina; United States
- Frequency: 1340 kHz

Programming
- Format: Urban Gospel; Christian talk and teaching

Ownership
- Owner: New Life Community Temple of Faith, Inc.
- Sister stations: WDEX

History
- First air date: July 23, 1947 (78 years ago)

Technical information
- Licensing authority: FCC
- Facility ID: 28816
- Class: C
- Power: 1,000 watts
- Transmitter coordinates: 34°57′09″N 80°03′00″W
- Translator: (101.7 MHz) W269DN (Wadesboro)

Links
- Public license information: Public file; LMS
- Webcast: Listen live
- Website: WDEX and WADE website

WADE (1340 kHz) is an AM radio station licensed to Wadesboro, North Carolina. It is owned by New Life Community Temple of Faith, Inc., and broadcasts an Urban Gospel radio format, with some Christian talk and teaching programs. WADE is simulcast with sister station WDEX 1430 AM in Monroe, North Carolina.

== History ==
On July 23, 1947, WADE signed on for the first time. It was constructed by Risden Allen Lyon with the help of his father, Robert Phillip Lyon.

WADE was originally a 1,000 watt daytimer radio station, operating at 1210 kilocycles and required to go off the air at sunset. The station had a 308-foot tower. At that time, with far fewer radio stations in the United States, the station's signal carried quite far. In the summer it was not unusual for station DJ's to advise listeners at Myrtle Beach, South Carolina, 125 miles away, that it was time to "turn so you don't burn."

During construction of the station, Lyon was determined to obtain the call sign WADE. He found that they were in use by a commercial ship. He successfully negotiated with the ship's owner for release of the call letters. Ruth Allen Lyon, Risden's mother, came up with a station slogan that was a play on the call letters, "We Advertise Dependable Enterprise."

WADE added an FM operation in the 1950s. Lyon gave up the FM license after several years because the equipment, especially the power tubes, was quite expensive and there were few FM receivers (thus listeners) at that point in time. Lyon later expressed mild regret for that decision.

In 1956 Lyon added sister station WKDX (1250 AM) in Hamlet, North Carolina, and in 1964 he added WRPL (1540 AM) in Charlotte, North Carolina.

WADE was sold to Long Pine Broadcasting in 1985, with the Lyon family owner financing the transaction. In 1992 Long Pine (Clark Ratliffe) defaulted on the loan with the Lyon family. Essex Communications, a Virginia company, paid off the loan, took ownership of the station, and sold the station to the current owner, Inspirational Deliverance Center.

In the late 1980s, WADE received authorization to change the frequency to 1340 AM, allowing for nighttime broadcasting.

Inspirational Deliverance Center sold WADE to New Life Community Temple of Faith, Inc., at a purchase price of only $10. The sale was consummated on January 27, 2015.
