= WKCW =

- Warrenton, Virginia; United States
- Broadcast area: Fauquier–Prince William County, Virginia
- Frequency: 1420 kHz
- Branding: 1420 WKCW

Programming
- Format: Classic hits

Ownership
- Owner: Radio Companion, LLC; (Radio Companion Limited Liability Company)

History
- First air date: December 7, 1957; 68 years ago
- Former call signs: WKTF (1957–1960)

Technical information
- Licensing authority: FCC
- Facility ID: 73190
- Class: D
- Power: 22,000 watts (day); 60 watts (night)
- Transmitter coordinates: 38°43′52.0″N 77°46′42.0″W

Links
- Public license information: Public file; LMS

WKCW is a classic hits formatted broadcast radio station at 1420 kHz on the AM band and is licensed to Warrenton, Virginia, serving Fauquier and Prince William counties in Virginia. WKCW is owned and operated by Radio Companion, LLC.

== History ==
The station originally signed on the air in 1957 as WKTF and later changed to its current WKCW call sign in 1960. For most of its history, WKCW or "Big K Radio" was one of the nation's longest-running traditional country music stations. After running the country format from 1960 to 2003 it was sold and switched to a spanish variety format in 2004. Over the years, the station went through a number of formats from spanish variety, gospel, news, oldies, adult hits to the current classic hits.

After going silent in July 2025 due to damage to the southwest tower, as of April 2026 the station is back on the air at reduced power.

WKCW is heard during daytime hours, "From the Blue Ridge Mountains to the Beltway," covering all of Northern Virginia with its 22,000 watt transmitter (temporarily at reduced power), among the most powerful in the Washington, DC and Fredericksburg designated market areas (DMA). At night, the station cuts their power down to 60 watts to protect other radio stations operating at 1420 kHz.
