= WWWY =

Coordinates: 39°04′02″N 85°42′10″W

- North Vernon, Indiana; United States
- Broadcast area: Columbus, Indiana; Franklin, Indiana; Madison, Indiana
- Frequency: 106.1 MHz
- Branding: 106.1 The River

Programming
- Format: Classic hits
- Affiliations: Compass Media Networks

Ownership
- Owner: White River Broadcasting Co., Inc.
- Sister stations: WCSI, WINN

History
- First air date: March 19, 1963
- Former call signs: WOCH-FM (1979–1983); WNVI-FM (1983–1988); WINN (1988–2001)

Technical information
- Licensing authority: FCC
- Facility ID: 61195
- Class: B
- ERP: 50,000 watts
- HAAT: 148 meters (486 ft)

Links
- Public license information: Public file; LMS
- Webcast: Listen live
- Website: 1061theriver.com

WWWY (106.1 FM) is a radio station broadcasting a classic hits format. Licensed to North Vernon, Indiana, the station serves the areas of Columbus, Indiana; Franklin, Indiana; and Madison, Indiana, and is owned by White River Broadcasting Co., Inc.

== History ==
106.1 FM signed on March 19, 1963, as WINN-FM. 106.1 FM became WWWY-FM in late 2001.

The radio station has had various different formats in its history. One of the most popular formats that was on WWWY was a mainstream rock format that was branded as "Rockin' Hits Y106" and later on as "Y106 Indiana's Rock Station" that existed from circa 2004 to June 29, 2012. One June 29, 2012, WWWY started simulcasting the classic hits format that also existed on WINN-FM 104.9. On June 2, 2012, WINN 104.9 FM became a hot adult contemporary format.
