= KPIR =

Radio station in Glanbury, Texas

Coordinates: 32°27′43″N 97°47′20″W

- Granbury, Texas; United States
- Broadcast area: Hood County
- Frequency: 1420 kHz
- Branding: The Pirate

Programming
- Format: Classic Country

Ownership
- Owner: Jerry Reynolds; (KPIR Granbury, LLC)

History
- First air date: 1980 as KPAR
- Former call signs: KPAR (1980–2002)
- Call sign meaning: Pirate (name of Granbury High School sports team)

Technical information
- Licensing authority: FCC
- Facility ID: 30195
- Class: B
- Power: 500 watts

Links
- Public license information: Public file; LMS
- Website: kpir.com

KPIR (1420 kHz) is a commercial AM radio station in Granbury, Texas, serving Hood County. It is owned by Jerry Reynolds, with the license held by KPIR Granbury, LLC. It airs a classic country radio format, featuring Texas country artists. It also carries Granbury High School football games. Because the team is known as The Pirates, the station calls itself "Pirate 1420."

The station broadcasts at 500 watts using a directional antenna at all times. It transmits from a three tower array in the daytime and from two towers at night. In addition to its broadcasts, the station can be heard streaming on its website.

== History ==
The station signed on the air in 1980 as KPAR. The station suffered financial problems and became a daytime only station in 1986. The station changed its call letters to KPIR in 2002. The station is now a 24-hour operation.
