= WCSI =

- Columbus, Indiana; United States
- Frequency: 1010 kHz
- Branding: Newstalk 1010

Programming
- Format: Talk radio
- Affiliations: Fox News Radio; Compass Media Networks; Premiere Networks; Westwood One

Ownership
- Owner: White River Broadcasting Co., Inc.
- Sister stations: WINN, WWWY

History
- First air date: 1950
- Call sign meaning: Columbus, Indiana

Technical information
- Licensing authority: FCC
- Facility ID: 72261
- Class: D
- Power: 330 watts (day); 18 watts (night)
- Transmitter coordinates: 39°11′12.00″N 85°57′0.00″W
- Translator: 98.1 W251CK (Columbus)

Links
- Public license information: Public file; LMS
- Webcast: Listen live
- Website: 1010wcsi.com

WCSI (1010 AM) is a commercial radio station licensed to Columbus, Indiana, United States. Owned by White River Broadcasting Co., Inc., it carries a talk radio format, with studios and offices located on Washington Street in Columbus, near National Road.

WCSI is also heard over low-power FM translator W251CK at 98.1 MHz.

== History ==
In 1950, WCSI signed on the air. It was originally a daytimer, powered at 250 watts and required to go off the air at sunset. It was owned by Syndicate Theaters, Inc. Its offices and studios were on Third Street in Columbus.

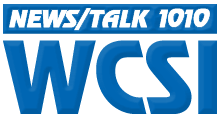
Logo before translator sign on

An FM station was added in 1958, WCSI-FM (now WKKG). Originally WCSI-FM simulcast the AM station's full service adult contemporary format. But in the 1970s, it switched to country music.

== Programming ==
John Foster hosts WCSI's local morning show; the remainder of the schedule is made up of nationally syndicated conservative talk shows.
