= WAMV =

Radio station in Amherst, Virginia

- Amherst, Virginia; United States
- Broadcast area: Amherst County, Virginia
- Frequency: 1420 kHz
- Branding: WAMV 1420

Programming
- Format: Southern gospel; Christian talk and teaching

Ownership
- Owner: Community First Broadcasters, Inc.

History
- First air date: October 1, 1976
- Former call signs: WAMV (1976–1985); WWWL (1985–1988)
- Call sign meaning: Amherst, Virginia

Technical information
- Licensing authority: FCC
- Facility ID: 12919
- Class: D
- Power: 2,200 watts (day); 47 watts (night)
- Transmitter coordinates: 37°32′23.5″N 79°3′9.1″W (day); 37°32′23.5″N 79°5′29.1″W (night)
- Translator: 103.1 W276DN (Amherst)

Links
- Public license information: Public file; LMS
- Webcast: Listen live
- Website: wamvradio.com

WAMV (1420 kHz) is a commercial AM radio station licensed to Amherst, Virginia, serving Amherst County and the suburbs of Lynchburg. WAMV is owned and operated by Community First Broadcasters, Inc. It broadcasts a southern gospel and Christian talk and teaching radio format. The studios and offices are on School Road in Amherst.

By day, WAMV is powered at 2,200 watts non-directional. To protect other stations on 1420 AM from interference, at night it reduces power to only 47 watts. The AM transmitter is on Higginbotham Creek Road in Sweet Briar. Programming is also heard on 250-watt FM translator W276DN at 103.1 MHz in Amherst.
