= WCPM =

Cumberland, Kentucky; United States
- Frequency: 1280 kHz

Programming
- Format: Defunct

Ownership
- Owner: Cumberland City Broadcasting, Inc.

History
- First air date: November 1, 1951
- Last air date: August 31, 2016
- Call sign meaning: We're Country Plus More

Technical information
- Facility ID: 14729
- Class: D
- Power: 1,000 watts day 115 watts night
- Transmitter coordinates: 36°58′25″N 82°59′15″W

WCPM (1280 AM) was a radio station licensed to Cumberland, Kentucky, United States. The station, owned by Cumberland City Broadcasting, Inc. signed off on August 31, 2016, after serving the area for 65 years. Its studios were on Keller Street in downtown Cumberland.

The station's license was cancelled by the Federal Communications Commission on December 19, 2018.
