= KIGO =

- St. Anthony, Idaho; United States
- Frequency: 1420 kHz

Programming
- Format: Regional Mexican

Ownership
- Owner: Albino Ortega

History
- First air date: 1966

Technical information
- Facility ID: 22622
- Class: D
- Power: 32,000 watts day 12 watts night
- Transmitter coordinates: 43°40′2″N 111°52′14″W

KIGO (1420 AM) is a radio station broadcasting a regional Mexican format. Licensed to St. Anthony, Idaho, United States, the station is currently owned by Albino Ortega.

When it first came on the air in 1966 KIGO was on 1400 kHz. It moved to 1420 kHz in 2006.
