= WCGB =

Radio station in Juana Díaz, Puerto Rico

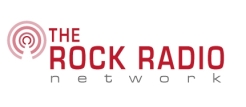
- Juana Diaz, Puerto Rico; Puerto Rico
- Broadcast area: Puerto Rico
- Frequency: 1060 kHz
- Branding: The Rock Radio Network

Programming
- Format: Religious
- Affiliations: Salem Radio Network

Ownership
- Owner: Calvary Evangelistic Mission, Inc.
- Sister stations: WBMJ; WIVV

History
- First air date: December 20, 1967
- Call sign meaning: Caribbean; Grace; Broadcasters

Technical information
- Licensing authority: FCC
- Facility ID: 24708
- Class: B
- Power: 5,000 watts day 500 watts night
- Transmitter coordinates: 17°59′28″N 66°28′32″W
- Translator: W293DP 106.5 MHz (Juana Diaz)

Links
- Public license information: Public file; LMS
- Website: therockradio.org

WCGB (1060 AM) is a radio station broadcasting a Religious format as part of The Rock Radio Network. Licensed to Juana Diaz, Puerto Rico, it serves the Puerto Rico area. The station is currently owned by Calvary Evangelistic Mission, Inc. and features programming from Salem Radio Network.

== History ==
WCGB (AM-1060) was founded in 1967 by Grace Broadcasters, Inc. The station was built in Juana Díaz. WCGB was an all-Spanish station with a Christian emphasis, but slightly secular in programming. For example, the station covered local sports, news, and politics, and it aired secular music. Yet the management also made sure that every hour of programming contained something with a religious context. For many years, the management of The Rock had desired to reach the Western side of Puerto Rico and Ponce. In 2004, Grace Broadcasters sold WCGB to Calvary Evangelistic Mission. When WCGB joined The Rock, its programming changed to a bilingual teaching format almost identical to what was already airing on WIVV and WBMJ. Most of the programming today on WCGB originates from The Rock's main studios in San Juan. However, WCGB retains a four-hour block of its own programming every weekday morning between the hours of 9 AM to 1 PM. This programming can be listened to live on a separate live stream through the Network's website.

== Translator stations ==
Broadcast translator for WCGB
Call sign	Frequency	City of license	FID	ERP (W)	FCC info
W293DP	106.5 FM	Juana Diaz, Puerto Rico	202857	250	LMS
