= WDCY =

- Douglasville, Georgia; United States
- Broadcast area: Atlanta, Georgia
- Frequency: 1520 kHz

Programming
- Format: Christian talk and teaching

Ownership
- Owner: Word Christian Broadcasting Inc.
- Sister stations: WDPC, WNEA

History
- First air date: June 30, 1964
- Former call signs: WDGL (1964–1984); WSPZ (1984–1990)

Technical information
- Licensing authority: FCC
- Facility ID: 73693
- Class: D
- Power: 2,500 watts day 800 watts critical hours (construction permit for 50,000 watts days only)
- Transmitter coordinates: 33°45′48.00″N 84°44′28.00″W; Construction permit for 33°45′38.00″N 84°41′18.00″W

Links
- Public license information: Public file; LMS
- Website: WDCY Program Schedule

WDCY (1520 kHz) is an AM Christian radio station broadcasting a Christian talk and teaching radio format. Licensed to Douglasville, Georgia, it serves the Atlanta metro area. The station is owned by Word Christian Broadcasting Inc. Much of the programming is simulcast with co-owned 1500 WDPC in Dallas, Georgia, and 1300 WNEA in Newnan, Georgia.

WDCY is a daytimer, powered at 2,500 watts (800 watts during critical hours) but required to go off the air at night so it cannot interfere with Class A stations WWKB Buffalo and KOKC Oklahoma City. AM 1520 is a clear channel frequency. The transmitter is off Brown Street in Douglasville.

The station has been issued a construction permit by the Federal Communications Commission (FCC) to increase power to the maximum for commercial AM stations, 50,000 watts. It would use a directional antenna pattern aimed toward Atlanta from a new transmitter location, but still not be on the air at night. The new proposed daytime directional antenna pattern will require a four tower array.

== History ==
On April 4, 1964, the station signed on as WDGL. It was owned by Douglas County Broadcasting and was powered at 1,000 watts in the daytime (500 watts during critical hours) but required to be off the air at night.
