= WINN =

Coordinates: 39°11′09″N 85°57′37″W

- Columbus, Indiana; United States
- Frequency: 104.9 MHz
- Branding: WIN 104.9

Programming
- Format: Hot Adult Contemporary

Ownership
- Owner: White River Broadcasting Co., Inc.
- Sister stations: WWWY

History
- First air date: January 30, 1975

Technical information
- Licensing authority: FCC
- Facility ID: 41891
- Class: A
- ERP: 6,000 watts
- HAAT: 91 meters (299 ft)

Links
- Public license information: Public file; LMS
- Webcast: Listen live
- Website: win1049.com

WINN (104.9 FM) is a radio station broadcasting a Hot Adult Contemporary format. Licensed to Columbus, Indiana, the station is owned by White River Broadcasting Co., Inc.

== History ==
104.9 FM signed on January 30, 1975, as WWWY-FM. It was an MOR (Middle of the road) radio station. The very first song played was "Have You Ever Been Mellow" by Olivia Newton-John. It became WINN-FM in late 2001.

The radio station has had various different formats throughout its history. It had a Classic Hits format branded as 104.9 The River from 2007? until July 2, 2012, when it became a Hot Adult Contemporary Format. The Classic Hits format is now on WWWY branded at 106.1 The River.
