= WAEW =

- Crossville, Tennessee; United States
- Frequency: 1330 kHz
- Branding: WAEW Talk Radio 96.3 FM & 1330 AM

Programming
- Format: Talk radio
- Affiliations: CBS News Radio; Premiere Networks; Salem Radio Network; Townhall News; Westwood One

Ownership
- Owner: Main Street Media, LLC
- Sister stations: WCSV, WOWF, WPBX

History
- First air date: 1952
- Call sign meaning: Arthur E Wilkerson

Technical information
- Licensing authority: FCC
- Facility ID: 14619
- Class: D
- Power: 1,000 watts day; 35 watts night
- Transmitter coordinates: 35°57′1.00″N 85°2′9.00″W
- Translator: See below

Links
- Public license information: Public file; LMS
- Website: Official website

WAEW (1330 AM) is a radio station licensed to Crossville, Tennessee, United States. The station is owned by Main Street Media, LLC.

Logo under previous 96.9 frequency

== FM Translator ==
In addition to the main station on 1330 kHz, WAEW programming is relayed to an FM translator. The FM translator provides improved coverage, especially at night when the AM station broadcasts with only 35 watts.

Broadcast translator for WAEW
Call sign	Frequency	City of license	FID	ERP (W)	HAAT	Class	FCC info
W242DH	96.3 FM	Crossville, Tennessee	148738	250	63 m (207 ft)	D	LMS
