= WBMJ =

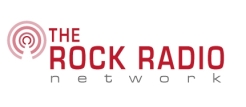

San Juan, Puerto Rico; Puerto Rico
- Broadcast area: Puerto Rico
- Frequency: 1190 kHz
- Branding: The Rock Radio Network

Programming
- Format: Religious
- Affiliations: Salem Radio Network

Ownership
- Owner: Calvary Evangelistic Mission, Inc.
- Sister stations: WIVV, WCGB

History
- First air date: 1968
- Former call signs: WXTO (1984-1985)
- Call sign meaning: We Broadcast the Message of Jesus

Technical information
- Licensing authority: FCC
- Facility ID: 8440
- Class: B
- Power: 10,000 watts day 5,000 watts night
- Transmitter coordinates: 18°21′0″N 66°6′50″W
- Translator: 99.5 W258DT (San Juan)

Links
- Public license information: Public file; LMS
- Website: rockradionetwork.org

WBMJ (1190 AM) is a radio station broadcasting a Religious format. Licensed to San Juan, Puerto Rico, it serves the Puerto Rico area. The station is currently owned by Calvary Evangelistic Mission, Inc. and features programming from Salem Communications.

WBMJ's programming is also heard on translator station W258DT 99.5 FM, also licensed to San Juan.

WBMJ is one of three AM stations that comprise The Rock Radio Network. The station's studio facilities are in Santurce, Puerto Rico. The facilities serve as the hub of the Network, and most of the Networks's programming originates from there. The transmitter is in Barrio Camarones, in Guaynabo, Puerto Rico. It is operated with a 10,000-watt Nautel transmitter and broadcasts in a directional pattern. For more information on WBMJ, see The Rock Radio Network.

WBMJ broadcasts in a Religious format. Its programming is bilingual and consists largely of biblical teaching in English and in Spanish. WBMJ also broadcasts a limited amount of Christian music. It serves as the Puerto Rico affiliate of the Salem Radio Network News agency. WBMJ is also the site of the Bible Correspondence School of the Caribbean.

== Early history ==
WBMJ was owned by Bob Hope’s Mid-Ocean Broadcasting Company, and set up by its General Manager, the late Bob Bennett in 1967-1968. The station covered the northeastern corner of Puerto Rico including the San Juan metro area. WBMJ signed on in 1968, under Bob Bennett, who continued to manage the station through 1980, when Bob Hope's Mid Ocean sold to record impresario Jerry Masucci.

Bob Bennett was a veteran of U.S. Top 40 radio when he moved to Puerto Rico and started building WBMJ. The station was a modified version of the common Top 40 format used in many parts of the world. Since the island of Puerto Rico is a U.S. territory, there were many "continentals" (non native to Puerto Rico English speakers) as well as many bilingual Puerto Ricans. So it was decided to use mainland announcers and jingles and, of course, closely follow Billboard record charts. The original deejays who signed the station on the air in 1968 were Charlie Brown, Ric Roberts, and Bobby West. Program director Bill Thompson and station manager Bob Bennett would do a stint on the air from time to time as well. Many commercials were in English, but because nearly all advertising came from local ad agencies, most were in Spanish. Often, a mixture of English and Spanish ("Spanglish") was used by the announcers for broad appeal to the station's culturally divergent audience.

From 1968 to roughly 1972, WBMJ was an American hits Top 40 station. The reasoning for the format was simple: all through Latin America, American music was popular. A really tightly done Top 40 with U.S. hits would be an attractive proposition. The station became instantly popular with its young target demographic, as it was the first broadcasting outlet to bring mainland Top 40 hits to the island. The programming was divided between standard shifts, or day parts. A local sales staff was recruited to visit the many ad agencies in San Juan. The March 17, 1973 Billboard Magazine reports that "WBMJ, [a] Top 40 station in Puerto Rico, now has Bob Bennett 6-9 a.m., Charlie Brown until 1 p.m., Phil Baker 1-4 p.m., Marty Mald 4-7 p.m., and Moonshadow 7-signoff, with Karl (Scott Brady) Phillips doing weekends." Phillips is notable because he was an active-duty U.S. Navy member at the time and did the work more for amusement than for pay. Others, such as popular WBMJ DJ Harry Sherwood, leveraged their visibility to augment their income. Sherwood became recognized all over the Caribbean as the voice for Eastern Airlines.

In 1972, WBMJ switched to Spanish jocks and a mix of 90% English music with some Spanish pop hits, under the name of Radio Rock. Radio Rock was generally among the top three or four radio stations in San Juan, staying there through much of the rest of the '70s, challenged seriously only by WKAQ with its Spanish Top 40, WQII with its Spanish AC format and WZNT with its all-Salsa format. WBMJ became a salsa oldies station programmed by David Gleason and Silvio Iglesias around late 1980 as Exitos 1190 and then, eventually, became religious under the ownership of the operators of WIVV from Puerto Rico's Vieques Island.

== Translator stations ==
Broadcast translator for WBMJ
Call sign	Frequency	City of license	FID	ERP (W)	FCC info
W258DT	99.5 FM	San Juan, Puerto Rico	202946	250	LMS
