= WFMW =

- Madisonville, Kentucky; United States
- Frequency: 730 kHz

Programming
- Format: Classic country

Ownership
- Owner: Ham Broadcasting, Inc.
- Sister stations: WKTG

History
- First air date: January 19, 1947
- Former call signs: WCIF (1947–1950)

Technical information
- Licensing authority: FCC
- Facility ID: 60880
- Class: D
- Power: 500 watts day 215 watts night
- Transmitter coordinates: 37°21′31″N 87°29′45″W
- Translator: 107.7 W299CN (Madisonville)

Links
- Public license information: Public file; LMS
- Webcast: Listen Live
- Website: wfmwradio.com

WFMW (730 AM) is a radio station broadcasting a classic country format. Licensed to and serving Madisonville, Kentucky, United States, the station is currently owned by Ham Broadcasting, Inc.

== History ==
The station began operations on January 19, 1947, as WCIF, which was under ownership of Pierce and Dutch Lackey. Two years later, the station launched its FM companion, WCIF-FM, at 104.9 megacycles. However, that same year, Messenger Broadcasting Company, a unit of the Madisonville Messenger newspaper, built and signed on WFMW-FM at 103.1 megacycles, which became Kentucky's first-ever FM-exclusive radio station. In 1950, the Messenger acquired the Lackey-owned station. As a result, WCIF and WFMW were consolidated to become one radio empire; WCIF-FM was permanently taken off the air, while the AM station was acquired to became WFMW to match the callsign of the surviving FM station (now WKTG), which later increased their power and changed frequencies to 93.9 MHz.

On November 19, 1970, the station was knocked off the air due to winds blowing down the station's transmission tower. The AM station returned to the air the next day, but the FM was fed on local cable television by means of telephone line until the FM transmitter was repaired.

The FM station became a separate entity in 1978, when it began broadcasting a classic rock format as WKTG, while WFMW became one of the first stations in western Kentucky to go exclusively country.

Former logo

WFMW remained in the hands of the original owners until being sold to various companies, including Sound Telecasters, Inc. Sound Telecasters sold WFMW and WKTG in June 2024 to Cadiz, Kentucky-based Ham Broadcasting, Inc. for a reported price of $815,000. Ham Broadcasting took over operation of both stations, beginning July 1.

== Programming ==
Programming on WFMW includes Madisonville-North Hopkins Maroons high school sports, a tradio program called "Tell & Sell," a sports-talk program called "Kentucky Sports Radio," Country Gold with Randy Owen, The Country Oldies Show, Classic Country Rewind, and Looking Up Country with Johnny Stone. The local airstaff includes long-time broadcaster Danny Koeber, Aaron Bone, and others.
