= KMOG =

- Payson, Arizona; United States
- Frequency: 1420 kHz
- Branding: The Ranch

Programming
- Format: Country

Ownership
- Owner: Farrell Enterprises LLC

History
- First air date: November 1, 1983

Technical information
- Licensing authority: FCC
- Facility ID: 21218
- Class: D
- Power: 3,000 watts (days only))
- Transmitter coordinates: 34°16′00″N 111°18′54″W
- Translator: 103.3 K277BX (Star Valley)

Links
- Public license information: Public file; LMS
- Website: kmogcountry.com

KMOG (1420 AM, "Rim Country Radio") is a commercial radio station licensed to Payson, Arizona, United States. It is owned by Farrell Enterprises LLC, and airs a full-service/country music format. The studios and transmitter are on East Taylor Parkway in Payson.

Programming is heard around the clock on 250-watt FM translator K277BX at 103.3 MHz in Star Valley.

== History ==
While it was still being constructed, the station was assigned the KMOG call letters by the Federal Communications Commission on March 15, 1982. It signed on the air on November 1, 1983. It was owned by RimCo, Inc. The original developers were Neil Monaco, Hall Mayo and Willard Taylor. The station featured an adult contemporary music format and it was an affiliate of the ABC Information Radio Network.

It was bought by Michael Farrell in 1989, who switched the format to country music. Its programming includes local news, local talk, religious programs on Sundays and a tradio show middays from Monday through Saturday.
