= WCND =

- Shelbyville, Kentucky; United States
- Frequency: 940 kHz
- Branding: La Pantera 940

Programming
- Format: Regional Mexican

Ownership
- Owner: Pedro C. Arce

Technical information
- Licensing authority: FCC
- Facility ID: 60083
- Class: D
- Power: 250 watts day 10 watts night
- Transmitter coordinates: 38°12′48″N 85°10′16″W

Links
- Public license information: Public file; LMS
- Webcast: Listen Live
- Website: radiopantera.com

WCND (940 AM) is a radio station licensed to Shelbyville, Kentucky, and serving the eastern suburbs in the Louisville metropolitan area. The station is owned by Pedro C. Arce. It airs a Regional Mexican radio format.

By day, it is powered at 250 watts. But 940 AM is a Mexican and Canadian clear channel frequency. To avoid interference with other stations, WCND greatly reduces power to 10 watts at night.

The station had been off the air between 2009 and 2010. There is no publicly accessible record indicating that the owner of the station filed for authorization to maintain the license while remaining off the air.

Former logo

On June 1, 2010, WCND returned to the air with a Regional Mexican format branded as "La Explosiva 940".

On June 15, 2019, WCND began simulcasting on WLRT 1250 AM, also in the Louisville area. In late January 2022, WCND split the simulcast with WLRT and rebranded as "La Pantera 940".

The Federal Communications Commission revoked the station's license on July 25, 2025, for failure to pay fiscal year (FY) 2013, 2014, 2015, 2016, 2022, and 2023 regulatory fee debt owed totaling $9,261.41 as of July 11, 2025.

On August 18, 2025, the FCC granted a Petition for Reconsideration. The license and callsign were reinstated.
