= WDEX =

- Monroe, North Carolina; United States
- Broadcast area: Charlotte
- Frequency: 1430 kHz

Programming
- Format: Urban Gospel; Christian talk and teaching

Ownership
- Owner: New Life Community Temple of Faith, Inc.
- Sister stations: WADE

Technical information
- Licensing authority: FCC
- Facility ID: 22028
- Class: B
- Power: 2,500 watts
- Transmitter coordinates: 34°59′4.00″N 80°36′14.00″W
- Translator: (100.1 MHz) W261DW (Monroe)

Links
- Public license information: Public file; LMS
- Website: WDEX and WADE website

WDEX (1430 kHz) is an AM radio station in Monroe, North Carolina. The station is owned by New Life Community Temple of Faith, Inc. along with WADE 1340 AM in Wadesboro, North Carolina. The two stations simulcast a radio format of urban gospel music along with Christian talk and teaching programs.

WDEX is powered at 2,500 watts, using a directional antenna at all times.

== History ==
WDEX signed on in December 1982 with an adult contemporary format. For a time, it was owned by Ford Broadcasting and shared much of its programming with WRNA, WRKB, and WLTC, which aired Southern gospel music along with preaching.
