= WDPC =

- Dallas, Georgia; United States
- Broadcast area: Metro Atlanta
- Frequency: 1500 kHz

Programming
- Format: Christian talk and teaching

Ownership
- Owner: Word Christian Broadcasting, Inc.
- Sister stations: WDCY, WNEA

History
- Former call signs: WKRP (1979–1989)

Technical information
- Licensing authority: FCC
- Facility ID: 73871
- Class: D
- Power: 5,000 watts day 3,200 watts critical hours
- Transmitter coordinates: 33°56′40.00″N 84°49′28.00″W
- Translator: (102.1 MHz) W271DK (Dallas)

Links
- Public license information: Public file; LMS
- Website: WDPC Program Schedule

WDPC (1500 kHz) is a Christian AM radio station broadcasting a Christian talk and teaching radio format. It is licensed to Dallas, Georgia, United States, and serves the west-northwestern Atlanta metropolitan area. The station is owned by Word Christian Broadcasting Inc. Much of the programming is simulcast with co-owned 1500 WDCY in Douglasville, Georgia and 1300 WNEA in Newnan, Georgia.

WDPC is a daytimer, transmitting with 5,000 watts during daytime hours and with 3,200 watts during critical hours at local sunrise and sunset. The station signs off during nighttime hours because AM 1500 is a clear channel frequency. The station is classified as a class D station by the U.S. Federal Communications Commission (FCC).

== History ==
=== As WKRP ===
The station signed on in September 1979 as WKRP. At first, the FCC denied the call sign to the new station, stating that MTM Enterprises, the producers of the popular CBS television series WKRP in Cincinnati, had a 'hold' on the call letters. When the station's lawyer told the FCC that "MTM is neither a licensee, nor a permittee. Therefore, MTM has no legal basis to reserve the WKRP callsign", the FCC allowed the assignment.

=== As WDPC ===
In August 1989, the station switched to WDPC, meaning Dallas/Paulding County.
