= WCEH (AM) =

- Hawkinsville, Georgia; United States
- Frequency: 610 kHz
- Branding: The Rooster

Programming
- Format: Classic hits

Ownership
- Owner: Gorilla Broadcasting
- Sister stations: WDXQ

History
- First air date: 1952
- Former call signs: WCEH (1952–2004); WJFN (2004–2006)

Technical information
- Licensing authority: FCC
- Facility ID: 67705
- Class: D
- Power: 500 watts day 126 watts night
- Transmitter coordinates: 32°16′50.00″N 83°26′37.00″W
- Translator: 96.1 W241CO (Hawkinsville)

Links
- Public license information: Public file; LMS
- Webcast: Listen live
- Website: theroosterfm.com

WCEH (610 kHz) is an AM radio station licensed to serve Hawkinsville, Georgia, and airs a classic hits format.

== History ==
Until 1993, WCEH was simulcast on 610 AM and 103.9 FM. The image slogan was "All The Best, AM 61 and FM 104". In 1993, WCEH-FM became WQSY-FM, "Sunny 103.9 FM", and its format was changed to adult contemporary.

In 2006, WCEH was one of five stations sold to Georgia Eagle Broadcasting..

In January 2008, WCEH announced that it would switch to carry Fox Sports programming 21 hours a day.

In April 2013, WCEH-AM dropped its sports format and started an oldies format called "Wonderful 61" where they play music from the 50s, 60s, and 70s. It is also simulcast on 98.3 FM on WCEH-FM.

On February 1, 2014, WCEH changed their format to adult standards, with programming from Westwood One's "America's Best Music" format.

On May 5, 2017, after WCEH was sold, WCEH and WCEH-FM started simulcasting The Fox 94.7. The sale of WCEH, WCEH-FM, WDXQ, WWKM, and W244CL by Georgia Eagle Media to John Timms' Central Georgia Radio LLC was consummated on August 3, 2017, at a purchase price of $150,000.

On July 31, 2018, WCEH and WCEH-FM started simulcasting ESPN Radio.

In October 2019, WCEH split from its simulcast with WCEH-FM and changed their format from sports to classic rock, branded as "Highway 96" (simulcast on FM translator W241CO 96.1 FM Hawkinsville).

In July 2024 the ownership and format changed and is now known as The Rooster.
