= WBLA =

- Elizabethtown, North Carolina; United States
- Broadcast area: Fayetteville; Elizabethtown; Lumberton
- Frequency: 1440 kHz
- Branding: Da Branch

Programming
- Format: Gospel music

Ownership
- Owner: Baldwin Branch Missionary Baptist Church

History
- First air date: August 3, 1956
- Former frequencies: 1450 kHz (1956–1958)
- Call sign meaning: Bladen County

Technical information
- Licensing authority: FCC
- Facility ID: 59467
- Class: D
- Power: 5,000 watts day; 197 watts night
- Transmitter coordinates: 34°37′33″N 78°37′27″W

Links
- Public license information: Public file; LMS
- Webcast: Listen live
- Website: wblaradio.com

WBLA (1440 AM; "Da Branch") is a radio station broadcasting a gospel music format. Licensed to Elizabethtown, North Carolina, United States, it serves the greater Fayetteville area. The station is owned by Baldwin Branch Missionary Baptist Church.

== History ==
WBLA signed on August 3, 1956. The station was originally owned by Bladen Broadcasting Corporation and affiliated with the Mutual Broadcasting System. The station originally broadcast at 1450 kHz, running 100 watts with unlimited hours of operation. In 1958, the station's frequency was changed to 1440 kHz and its power was increased to 1,000 watts, with daytime operations only. In 1978, the station's power was increased to 5,000 watts. For the next twenty years, WBLA broadcast a community-based country music format, with Robert Hester as its owner-manager for much of that period. Hester sold the station in 1989, after obtaining a construction permit for a Class A FM station, WGQR (105.7 FM).

In 1990, WBLA and WGQR were sold to Sound Business Inc., owned by Lee Hauser and later co-owned by Arthur DeBerry, for $550,000. Lee Hauser, who served as its president and WGQR/WBLA's general manager, began managing WJSK and WAGR in Lumberton, North Carolina, when the company bought those stations. Dan Hester, former TV news anchor at WWAY in Wilmington, briefly served as morning Host and General hanager for WGQR and WBLA. WGQR and WBLA both aired the Bladen County high school football game of the week. From 1990 to 2006, the stations simulcast an oldies and beach music format, with WBLA offering brokered programming, primarily from local African-American churches, on Sundays.

In 2004, Beasley Broadcasting attempted to purchase WBLA and WGQR for $850,000, but the Federal Communications Commission disallowed the purchase because Beasley would own too many stations in the market.

In January 2006, WGQR and WBLA were sold to Christian Listening Network for $875,000. WGQR switched to a southern gospel format. By 2010, the station had begun airing a gospel format.

In 2013, WBLA was donated to Baldwin Branch Missionary Baptist Church. The station began online streaming in 2015.
