= WABA (AM) =

Radio station based in Aguadilla, Puerto Rico

- Aguadilla, Puerto Rico; Puerto Rico
- Frequency: 850 kHz

Programming
- Format: Spanish News/Talk
- Affiliations: Radio Isla

Ownership
- Owner: Aguadilla Radio & TV Corp., Inc.

History
- First air date: November 15, 1951
- Former frequencies: 1240 kHz (1951-1955)

Technical information
- Licensing authority: FCC
- Facility ID: 648
- Class: B
- Power: 5,000 watts day 1,000 watts night
- Transmitter coordinates: 18°24′2.00″N 67°9′27.00″W

Links
- Public license information: Public file; LMS
- Webcast: Listen Live
- Website: waba850am.com

WABA (850 kHz) is an AM radio station in Aguadilla, Puerto Rico. The station has been on the air since 1951. WABA is the radio home to the Aguadilla Divas from the Female Superior Volleyball League, The Santeros de Aguada of the Superior Basketball League & the Aguadilla Sharks of the Superior Baseball League. The station covers the 75% of the entire western area. WABA is currently owned by Aguadilla Radio & TV Corporation, a local organization based in the western region and airs Spanish News/Talk linked to the Radio Isla Network.
