= WATV (AM) =

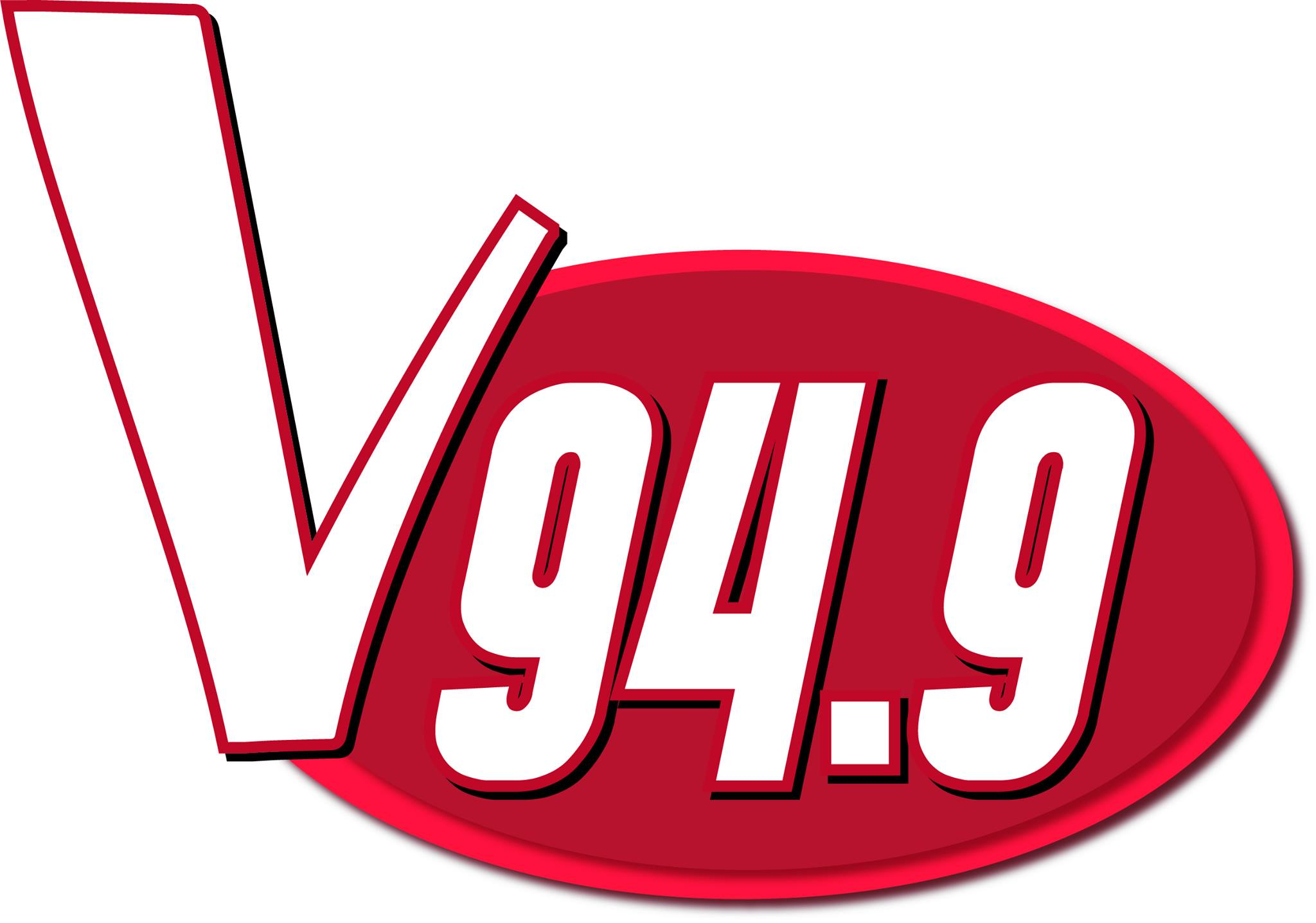
- Birmingham, Alabama; United States
- Frequency: 900 kHz
- Branding: V949

Programming
- Format: Urban contemporary
- Affiliations: Compass Media Networks; United Stations Radio Networks

Ownership
- Owner: Courtney French; (Courtney French Broadcasting)

History
- First air date: 1946; 80 years ago
- Former call signs: WKAX (1946–1951); WLBS (1951–1958)
- Call sign meaning: The V stands for variety (backronym)

Technical information
- Licensing authority: FCC
- Facility ID: 5356
- Class: D
- Power: 845 watts (day); 158 watts (night)
- Transmitter coordinates: 33°32′11″N 86°53′03″W
- Translator: 94.9 W235BS (Birmingham)

Links
- Public license information: Public file; LMS
- Webcast: Listen live
- Website: myv949.com

WATV (900 kHz) is an AM radio station licensed to Birmingham, Alabama. It transmits on 900 AM as well as FM translator W235BS 94.9 FM. WATV's daytime power is 845 watts, and at night, it transmits with 158 watts. WATV is an urban contemporary music station, specializing in soul, R&B, disco, and early hip-hop from the 1970s through today. Community issues are also often discussed on the air that pertain to the Black community. It is owned by Courtney French.

== History of WATV ==
The station currently known as WATV debuted on May 22,1946 as WKAX. It took its present callsign in 1958, as a CBS-affiliated, dual talk/MOR-formatted station. Prior to then, the callsign of the station was WLBS. Due to the restrictions of the Federal Communications Commission, the station originally broadcast only during daylight hours. In 1976, the owner of WENN, the top-rated urban-formatted station in Birmingham, died. WENN was then bought by local businessman A. G. Gaston, who immediately fired Joe Lackey, the station manager; all of the disc jockeys quit in protest. Lackey was then given a job managing WATV, a radio station located on the 20th floor of the Thomas Jefferson Hotel where he brought all the former WENN personalities with him. Lackey and the ex-WENN jocks immediately changed the station's format from talk and middle of the road music to soul and disco music. Despite operating with a relatively weak AM signal and broadcasting only from sunrise until sunset, WATV immediately became the top-rated radio station in Birmingham. During the 1980s, the station's format evolved from soul music to the forerunner of today's urban adult contemporary format.

In 1994, WATV dropped urban AC for ABC Radio Networks' Urban Gold.

Eventually the station was forced to move to 3025 Ensley Avenue, where the studios remain to this day.

In 2002, the station's owners, the Rev. Dr. Erskine Ramsay Faush Sr and Shelley Stewart, both longtime radio personalities in the Birmingham area, sold the station to MCL/MCM-INC, a subsidiary of Sheridan Broadcasting.

On September 14, 2006, Sheridan Broadcasting restructured its radio stations, and WATV was put under the control of MCL/MCM Alabama, LLC.

== See also ==
- WNET Channel 13, a Newark, New Jersey, television station which formerly held the WATV callsign.
