= WEMB =

- Erwin, Tennessee; United States
- Frequency: 1420 kHz

Ownership
- Owner: WEMB, Inc.

History
- First air date: 1956
- Last air date: 2016
- Call sign meaning: Name of founder's wife

Technical information
- Licensing authority: FCC
- Facility ID: 70509
- Class: D
- Power: 5,000 watts day; 21 watts night
- Transmitter coordinates: 36°06′58″N 82°26′49″W

Links
- Public license information: Public file; LMS

WEMB was a radio station which served the Tri-Cities region of Johnson City/Kingsport/Bristol in Tennessee and Bristol in Virginia. The outlet, owned by WEMB, Inc., was licensed to Erwin, Tennessee.

== History ==
The call letters EMB represented the initials of Elvia Meadows Blakemore, wife of Max Blakemore, who built the station over his pharmacy, Clinchfield Drug on Main Avenue in Erwin. WEMB's first broadcast license was granted June 6, 1956.

== Hostage situation ==
In June 1985, a gunman with two rifles held the station hostage for five hours. Lyle Shelton of Erwin interrupted a WEMB news broadcast in which WEMB news editor-in-chief Kathy Thornberry mentioned his recent arrest. Shelton told disc jockey Charles "Chuck" Ray he wanted to be put on the air. "He said he wanted to tell the truth," Ray told police. Broadcasting was shut down during the crisis. A SWAT Team from nearby Johnson City was brought in and ordered to surround the station. With his wife who he had flagged down, Shelton walked down the road due to him having left the station from the back door and walking a mile down the neighboring river and surrendered to police custody. No shots were fired.

== Ownership ==
The WEMB, Inc. trust was formed upon the 1994 death of WEMB's second owner, James True. In True's will, he left ownership of the station to be managed by General Manager James Crawford, Production Manager Charles Ray, and Operations Manager Hilda White. True decided the trust was to manage station affairs, with benefits being dealt to True's three adult children, until his eldest daughter turned 50 years old. True's daughter Maria D. True, having no experience in radio or broadcasting, disbanded the partnership and leased the station to NBC Sports Radio, completely eliminating the music, news, and production departments.

== Headquarters ==
In 1966, the station moved offices and broadcasting headquarters to Riverview Road, just south of Erwin, due to severe flooding of the Nolichucky River. In 2016, the WEMB, Inc. partnership was disbanded. Afterward, an application for license reinstatement was dismissed by the FCC.
