= WKFV =

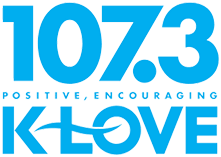
- Clinton, North Carolina; United States
- Broadcast area: Fayetteville, North Carolina
- Frequency: 107.3 MHz (HD Radio)
- Branding: K-Love

Programming
- Format: Contemporary Christian music
- Subchannels: HD2: Air1; HD3: K-Love Eras; HD4: Boost Radio
- Network: K-Love

Ownership
- Owner: Educational Media Foundation

History
- First air date: 1984
- Former call signs: WCLN-FM (1984–1991); WMXS (1991–1994); WCLN-FM (1994–2017)
- Call sign meaning: K-Love for Fayetteville

Technical information
- Licensing authority: FCC
- Facility ID: 11066
- Class: C3
- ERP: 9,200 watts
- HAAT: 163 meters
- Transmitter coordinates: 35°07′37″N 78°35′19″W
- Translators: 102.1 W271DR (Fayetteville); HD2: 102.9 W275BW (Fayetteville); HD4: 97.3 W247BS (Hope Mills)

Links
- Public license information: Public file; LMS
- Webcast: Listen live
- Website: www.klove.com

WKFV (107.3 FM) is a radio station broadcasting a contemporary Christian music format. Licensed to Clinton, North Carolina, United States, it serves the Fayetteville area. The station is owned by Educational Media Foundation, airing its K-Love format.

== History ==
WKFV signed on as WCLN-FM in 1984. At one time, its format was urban contemporary, and the call letters were once WMXS.

Larry Carr of Clinton, North Carolina, operated WCLN, a daytime-only station on 1170, and WCLN-FM (then at 107.1 FM) prior to the 1991 purchase of the 16-year-old stations by Willis Broadcasting Corp. of Norfolk, Virginia. The stations' format would be adult contemporary music and oldies.

WCLN and WCLN-FM were Christian when the FM station increased its power from 3000 to 25,000 watts and moved to 107.3 FM to better cover Fayetteville.

By 1997, WCLN was airing southern gospel music separately from the FM.

In 2000, WCLN-FM relocated its tower from Salemburg to near Stedman. In conjunction with the tower relocation, the station was granted FCC approval to relocate its main studio to Fayetteville.

After leadership changes to the station in 2004, the format drifted from inspiration to adult contemporary Christian music, becoming a Radio & Records reporting station in early 2005.

Effective December 15, 2017, Educational Media Foundation closed on the purchase of WCLN-FM from Christian Listening Network for $1.2 million. The same day, the station changed its call sign to WKFV.
