= WDAL (AM) =

Radio station in Dalton, Georgia, United States

- Dalton, Georgia; United States
- Broadcast area: Dalton, Georgia
- Frequency: 1430 kHz
- Branding: "98.3 The Mountain"

Programming
- Format: Classic hits

Ownership
- Owner: North Georgia Radio Group, L.P.

History
- First air date: 1954 (as WRCD)
- Former call signs: WRCD (1954–1987); WLSQ (1987–1995)
- Call sign meaning: Dalton

Technical information
- Licensing authority: FCC
- Facility ID: 54518
- Class: D
- Power: 2,100 watts day; 75 watts night
- Transmitter coordinates: 34°45′22″N 84°57′3.5″W
- Translator: 98.3 W252CR (Dalton)

Links
- Public license information: Public file; LMS
- Website: bulldog983.com

WDAL (1430 AM) is a radio station licensed to Dalton, Georgia, United States, broadcasting a classic hits format. The station is currently owned by North Georgia Radio Group, L.P. The station is also relayed on FM translator W252CR (98.3); this is reflected in its "98.3 The Mountain" branding.

== History ==
The station signed on in 1954 as WRCD, and changed its call letters to WLSQ on September 28, 1987. On June 1, 1995, the station changed its call sign to the current WDAL.

On January 20, 1987, WDAL had a construction permit to increase its daytime power to 5 kW.
