= WCOJ =

- Coatesville, Pennsylvania, U.S.; United States
- Broadcast area: Chester County, Pennsylvania, U.S.
- Frequency: 1420 (kHz)

Programming
- Format: Catholic radio

Ownership
- Owner: Holy Spirit Radio Foundation, Inc.

Technical information
- Licensing authority: FCC
- Facility ID: 63593
- Class: B
- Power: 5,000 watts
- Transmitter coordinates: 40°01′21.38″N 75°48′51.80″W

Links
- Public license information: Public file; LMS
- Website: holyspiritradio.org

WCOJ (1420 AM) is a non-commercial educational AM radio station licensed to serve Coatesville, Pennsylvania. The station airs a Catholic Radio format.

Since 2008, WCOJ has aired religious radio programming under the control of Philadelphia-based Holy Spirit Radio Foundation. The Holy Spirit Radio Foundation also owns WISP in Doylestown, Pennsylvania.

== History ==
Founded by Bill Halpern and Lou Seltzer, WCOJ began operating on November 29, 1949. It originally broadcast as a daytime only station at 1,000 watts. The radio station was a day-time only facility transmitting with 1,000 watts. The station increased its power to the 5,000 watts and began full-time operation in 1952.

Originally WCOJ's studios were located at the Palace Theater in downtown Coatesville, and later (in the early '50s) opened an auxiliary studio/business office above Woody Pontiac-Cadillac Inc at 809 E. Lincoln Highway. Over the years the station has also had studios at the transmitter site in West Brandywine Township, at 3721 East Lincoln Highway, Thorndale and at 17 West Gay Street, West Chester. The Seltzer and Halpern partnership which founded WCOJ also branched into cable television in late 1967, forming "Cable TV of Chester County". Over the next five years CATV of Chester County engineered and installed community CATV systems in Coatesville, Downingtown, and West Chester, and expanded into nearby municipalities as funds allowed.

WCOJ was perhaps best known for much of the time it has been in operation for the morning program hosted for over 40 years by station personality Art Douglas. By his retirement in 1995, Douglas had become a widely recognized figure in Chester County. In 1955, he came to Chester County and worked for WCOJ Radio in Coatesville. He was the "Voice of Chester County" for over 40 years. He became general manager but continued to do the morning show along with his sidekick, Jolly Joe Piscoglio, and Clifford E. DeBaptiste. He also, held the Phone Forum show in the afternoon. He retired in 1996 due to failing health.

In 1984, WCOJ (which had been co-owned with Coatesville's local cable television system) became part of Lenfest Communications, which operated cable systems throughout the region before itself becoming acquired by Comcast in 1997. At that time, WCOJ was "spun off" and sold to former WPHL station manager Lloyd B. Roach. In 2003, Roach and venture capital firm acquired a group of radio stations in central and Northeast Pennsylvania and Southern New York state to form Route 81 Radio. WCOJ was absorbed into the Route 81 station group.

Bought by Philadelphia-based Holy Spirit Radio Foundation October 2, 2008 they began broadcasting on October 7, 2008 with a live Mass broadcast from the Cathedral Basilica of Saints Peter and Paul marking the 5th Anniversary of Cardinal Justin Rigali's installation as Archbishop of Philadelphia.

WCOJ also was the Philadelphia Phillies Radio Network affiliate for Chester County until 2008. The last broadcast was September 28, 2008.

== Coverage area ==
WCOJ's transmitter is located just north of Coatesville in West Brandywine Township, Pennsylvania. The station's service contour covers almost all of Chester County, Pennsylvania, excluding only the extreme Northeast portion of the county known as The Main Line and the extreme southern part of the county along the Pennsylvania–Maryland border. The station also covers parts of Eastern Lancaster County, Pennsylvania. In addition to Coatesville and West Chester, communities covered include Phoenixville, and Kennett Square.

== Programming ==
WCOJ airs programming provided by The Holy Spirit Radio Foundation and mirrors the programming it provides on WISP, including satellite-fed audio programming from the Catholic-themed Eternal Word Television Network's radio feed, locally produced programs and specials, and local announcements on the hour.
