= WCPK =

- Chesapeake, Virginia; United States
- Broadcast area: Southside of Hampton Roads
- Frequency: 1600 kHz
- Branding: Hosanna Radio

Programming
- Language: Spanish
- Format: Contemporary Christian music

Ownership
- Owner: Hosanna Media Christian Group, Inc.

History
- First air date: 1967
- Former call signs: WCPK (1967–1987); WJQI (1987–1996); WFOG (1996–1997)
- Call sign meaning: "Chesapeake"

Technical information
- Licensing authority: FCC
- Facility ID: 64003
- Class: D
- Power: 4,200 Watts daytime 23 Watts nighttime
- Transmitter coordinates: 36°48′10.5″N 76°16′56.8″W

Links
- Public license information: Public file; LMS
- Webcast: WCPK Webstream
- Website: hosannaradiova.com

WCPK (1600 kHz) is a Spanish Contemporary Christian formatted broadcast radio station licensed to Chesapeake, Virginia, serving the Southside of Hampton Roads. WCPK is owned and operated by Hosanna Media Christian Group, Inc.
