= WCRE =

- Cheraw, South Carolina; United States
- Frequency: 1420 kHz
- Branding: My FM 93.9

Programming
- Format: Classic hits

Ownership
- Owner: Pee Dee Broadcasting, LLC

History
- First air date: July 1953

Technical information
- Licensing authority: FCC
- Facility ID: 16405
- Class: D
- Power: 1,000 watts day 97 watts night
- Transmitter coordinates: 34°40′48″N 79°53′58″W
- Translator: 93.9 W230AS (Cheraw)

Links
- Public license information: Public file; LMS
- Webcast: Listen Live
- Website: myfm939.com

WCRE (1420 AM) is a radio station broadcasting a classic hits format. Licensed to Cheraw, South Carolina, United States, the station is owned by Pee Dee Broadcasting, LLC.
