= WBCR (AM) =

- Alcoa, Tennessee; United States
- Frequency: 1470 kHz

Programming
- Format: Religious and conservative talk
- Affiliations: Genesis Communications Network

Ownership
- Owner: Blount County Broadcasting Corp.

History
- First air date: 1957
- Former call signs: WEAG (1957–1984); WMDR (1984–1993)
- Call sign meaning: Blount County Radio

Technical information
- Licensing authority: FCC
- Facility ID: 5887
- Class: D
- Power: 1,000 watts day; 77 watts night
- Transmitter coordinates: 35°46′4.7″N 84°0′57.1″W

Links
- Public license information: Public file; LMS
- Website: truthradio.tv

WBCR (1470 kHz) is an AM radio station licensed to Alcoa, Tennessee, United States. The station is owned by Blount County Broadcasting Corp. The station programming is a mixture of religious and conservative talk and religious music.

== History ==
The station went on the air as WEAG in 1957, in a full-service/MOR format. It changed its call sign to WMDR ("The Music Doctor") on July 16, 1984, and programmed Top-40. Later, the format switched to easy listening. On January 11, 1993, the station changed its call sign to WBCR.
