= WACB =

- Taylorsville, North Carolina; United States
- Frequency: 860 kHz
- Branding: B86 Radio

Programming
- Format: Variety

Ownership
- Owner: Apple City Broadcasting Co., Inc.

History
- First air date: August 19, 1964 (first license granted)

Technical information
- Licensing authority: FCC
- Facility ID: 2485
- Class: D
- Power: 250 watts day 8 watts night
- Transmitter coordinates: 35°55′57.00″N 81°10′19.00″W

Links
- Public license information: Public file; LMS
- Webcast: WACB Webcast
- Website: WACB Website

WACB (860 AM) is a radio station licensed to Taylorsville, North Carolina, United States. The station is owned by Apple City Broadcasting Co.
