= KRLL (AM) =

- California, Missouri; United States
- Broadcast area: Moniteau County, Missouri
- Frequency: 1420 kHz
- Branding: Real Country 1420

Programming
- Format: Country
- Affiliations: Westwood One

Ownership
- Owner: Moniteau Communications, Inc.

History
- First air date: July 27, 1984
- Former call signs: KTAA (1982–1983); KZMO (1983–1995); KREL (1995–2004)

Technical information
- Licensing authority: FCC
- Facility ID: 67381
- Class: D
- Power: 500 watts (day); 225 watts (night)
- Transmitter coordinates: 38°38′12.10″N 92°35′0.68″W

Links
- Public license information: Public file; LMS
- Webcast: KRLL Webstream
- Website: KRLL Online

KRLL is a country formatted broadcast radio station. The station is licensed to California, Missouri, and serves California and Moniteau County in Missouri. KRLL is owned and operated by Moniteau Communications, Inc.
