= WCEH-FM =

Coordinates: 32.168°N 83.631°W

- Pinehurst, Georgia; United States
- Frequency: 98.3 MHz
- Branding: Middle Georgia's ESPN

Programming
- Format: Sports
- Affiliations: ESPN Radio

Ownership
- Owner: Bill Shanks; (Shanks Broadcasting, LLC)
- Sister stations: WXKO

History
- First air date: 1969 (as WFAV)
- Former call signs: WFAV (1969–1992); WKKN (1992–2003); WQXZ (2003–2008); WSSY (2008–2013)

Technical information
- Licensing authority: FCC
- Facility ID: 60414
- Class: A
- ERP: 3,100 watts
- HAAT: 140 meters

Links
- Public license information: Public file; LMS
- Webcast: Listen Live
- Website: Middle Georgia's ESPN Website

WCEH-FM is an FM station licensed to Pinehurst, Georgia. It shared studios and offices with WCEH, WDXQ, WQXZ and WWKM in Hawkinsville, Georgia. The station, "Sunny 98.3", was first WFAV and later WKKN in Cordele, Georgia, and then WQXZ. The station moved its city of license after WMRZ Dawson, Georgia, signed on with 25,000 watts at 98.1 FM. Jim Popwell from Hawkinsville, the former owner of WSSY, was also the holder of the permit for the Dawson station. Popwell planned the move before selling all his stations in 2003. The transmitter site move for WSSY was required for the new Dawson station to operate at 25,000 watts. The new site could not be close enough to Cordele for continued licensure, so Pinehurst was selected to effect the move. The station programmed an adult standards format, and featured Hawkinsville High Football. It was also well received in Warner Robins, Cochran, Hawkinsville, Montezuma, Perry and other areas further north of Cordele. The station is owned by Shanks Broadcasting.

WFAV was an FM counterpart to Cordele's AM station, WMJM (their slogan was "1490 since 1940"), owned by James S. Rivers Sr. The Rivers family (James, son Jim, brother E.D. and E.D.'s son Dee, were prolific broadcasters, building numerous stations across the southern United States).

The station became WKKN under John Brooks ownership. WKKN was managed by the late Jim Jennings. Jennings spent a lifetime in radio, and was associated with many stations throughout his career.

In April 2013, WCEH-FM dropped the "Sunny 98.3" branding and starting simulcasting WCEH-AM which also switched its format to pre-Beatles era oldies music, calling itself "Sixty-Wonderful" playing 50s and 60s pop and rock & roll music. WCEH-AM is 610 on the dial, referred to as 61 in the days before digital tuning became the norm on most radios. The slogan Sixty-Wonderful was adapted in the late 50s, directly linked to the aforementioned "61". December 11, 2012 was the 60th anniversary of WCEH, but also the first day of the station's 61st year of operation. It seemed appropriate to revive the Sixty-Wonderful slogan with the decision to add the FM simulcast at 98.3.

On February 1, 2014, WCEH-FM changed their format to adult standards, with programming from Westwood One's "America's Best Music" format.

On May 5, 2017, after WCEH was sold, WCEH & WCEH-FM started simulcasting The Fox 94.7. The sale of WCEH-FM, WCEH, WDXQ, WWKM, and W244CL by Georgia Eagle Media to John Timms' Central Georgia Radio LLC was consummated on August 3, 2017, at a purchase price of $150,000.

On July 31, 2018, WCEH & WCEH-FM started simulcasting Middle Georgia's ESPN.
