= WDXQ =

- Cochran, Georgia; United States
- Broadcast area: Cochran, Georgia Hawkinsville
- Frequency: 1440 kHz
- Branding: El Gallo

Programming
- Format: Regional Mexican

Ownership
- Owner: Gorilla Broadcasting Company,LLC
- Sister stations: WCEH, WCEH-FM

History
- First air date: 1925 (as WVMG)
- Former call signs: WVMG (1925–2005); WDXQ (2005–2007); WDCO (2007–2010)

Technical information
- Licensing authority: FCC
- Facility ID: 26623
- Class: D
- Power: 940 watts day 44 watts night
- Transmitter coordinates: 32°24′43.00″N 83°21′42.00″W
- Translator: 96.7 W244CL (Cochran)

Links
- Public license information: Public file; LMS

WDXQ (1440 AM) is a radio station licensed to Cochran, Georgia, United States. The station is currently owned by Gorilla Broadcasting Company,LLC. The station's programming is duplicated by FM translator W244CL, operating at 96.7 MHz.

== History ==
The station went on the air as WDXQ on March 15, 2005. On July 19, 2007, the station changed its call sign to WDCO, and again on January 15, 2010, to WDXQ.

On November 26, 2019, WDXQ changed their format from hot adult contemporary to classic country, branded as "96 Country".

On July 1, 2024 the station ownership and format changed and became known as El Gallo with a Mexican format.
