= WDJA =

Spanish Christian radio station in Delray Beach, Florida

- Delray Beach, Florida; United States
- Frequency: 1420 kHz
- Branding: True Oldies Channel

Programming
- Format: Oldies

Ownership
- Owner: Little Dog Media LLC

History
- First air date: September 28, 1978
- Former call signs: WDBF (?-2001); WPBI (2001–2003); WFFL (2003); WFTL (2003)

Technical information
- Licensing authority: FCC
- Facility ID: 54038
- Class: B
- Power: 5,000 watts (day); 500 watts (night)
- Transmitter coordinates: 26°27′22.00″N 80°5′58.00″W
- Translators: 95.3 W237BD (Boca Raton); 95.9 W240CI (North Palm Beach)

Links
- Public license information: Public file; LMS
- Webcast: Listen live
- Website: universo1420.com

WDJA (1420 AM) is a radio station broadcasting an Oldies format, licensed to Delray Beach, Florida, United States. The station is owned by Little Dog Media, LLC.

== History ==
The station went on the air as WDBF in the 70s and broadcast a big band format under the ownership of bandleader Vic Knight. On April 3, 2001, the station changed its call sign to WPBI. On April 23, 2003, the calls were changed to WFFL but were quickly changed to WFTL one week later. The following week (May 7, 2003) the call sign was again changed to WDJA. On February 3, 2009, the World Ethnic format was dropped for a news/talk format.

On January 1, 2012, WDJA flipped to a Spanish Christian format branded as Radio Universo.
