= WDMC (AM) =

- Melbourne, Florida; United States
- Broadcast area: Space Coast
- Frequency: 920 kHz

Programming
- Format: Catholic radio
- Affiliations: EWTN Radio

Ownership
- Owner: Divine Mercy Communications

History
- First air date: January 4, 1956
- Former call signs: WMEL (1956–2008)
- Call sign meaning: Divine Mercy Communications

Technical information
- Licensing authority: FCC
- Facility ID: 55005
- Class: B
- Power: 8,000 watts (day); 4,000 watts (night)
- Transmitter coordinates: 28°7′16″N 80°43′09″W

Links
- Public license information: Public file; LMS
- Website: divinemercyradio.com

WDMC (920 AM) is a noncommercial radio station licensed to Melbourne, Florida, United States, serving much of the Space Coast. Owned by Divine Mercy Communications, it carries a Catholic radio format with programming sourced through EWTN Radio. WDMC's transmitter is sited on Eau Gallie Boulevard in Melbourne.

== History ==
On January 4, 1956, the station first signed on the air. For most of its years on the air, the station had the call sign WMEL, standing for its community of license, Melbourne. It had a middle of the road format of popular music, news and sports. It was a network affiliate of CBS Radio News.
