= WCLN (AM) =

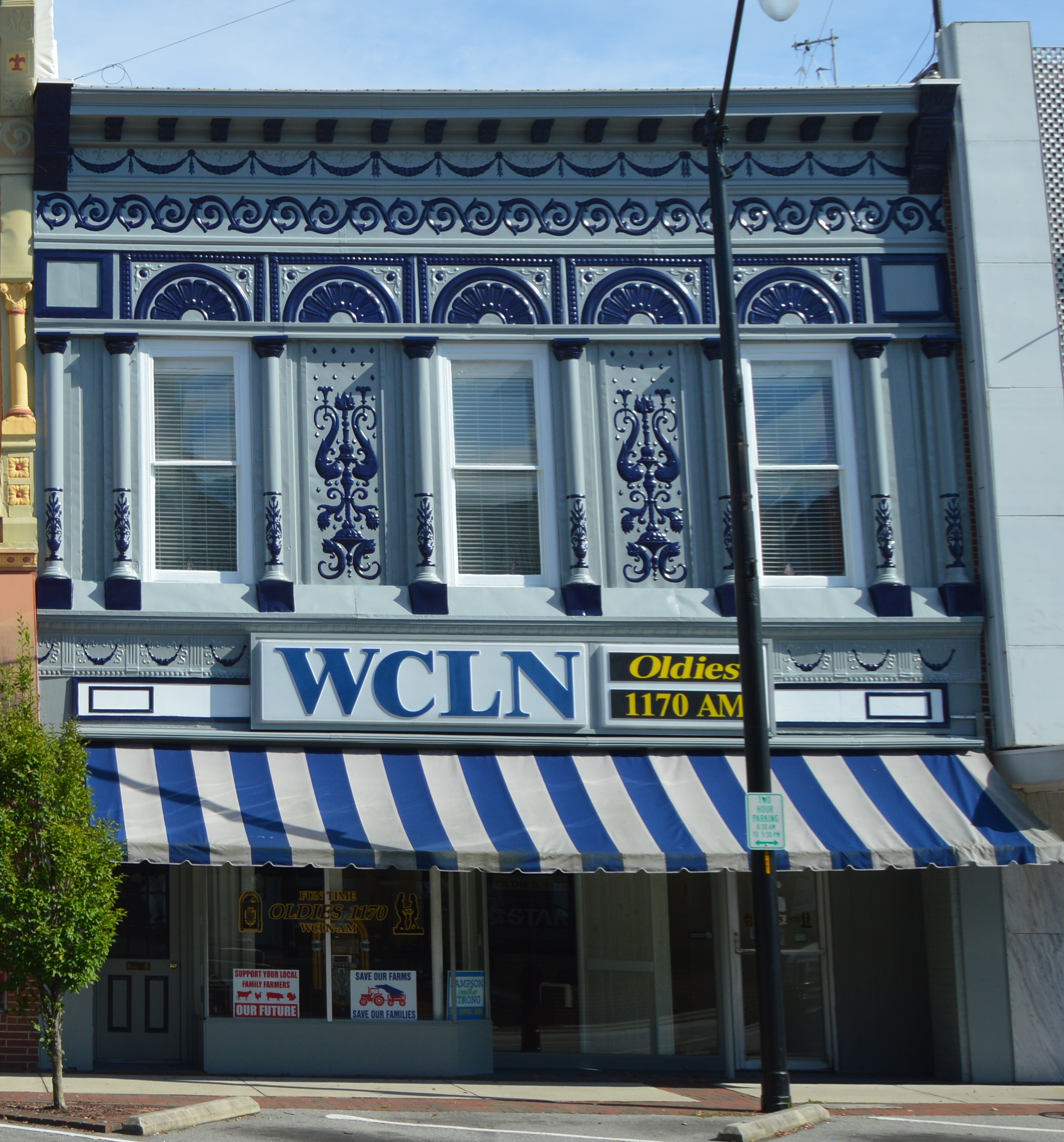
- Offices in the Powell Building in Clinton
- Clinton, North Carolina; United States
- Frequency: 1170 kHz
- Branding: Oldies 1170

Programming
- Format: Oldies
- Affiliations: Westwood One

Ownership
- Owner: Clinton/Sampson Radio, Inc.

History
- First air date: December 16, 1975
- Call sign meaning: "Clinton" or "Christian Listening Network"

Technical information
- Licensing authority: FCC
- Facility ID: 7090
- Class: D
- Power: 5,000 watts day 1,000 watts critical hours
- Transmitter coordinates: 35°1′21″N 78°20′58″W

Links
- Public license information: Public file; LMS
- Webcast: Listen live
- Website: www.oldies1170.com

WCLN (1170 AM) is a radio station broadcasting an oldies format. Licensed to Clinton, North Carolina, United States. The station is owned by Clinton/Sampson Radio, Inc.

== History ==
Larry Carr of Clinton, North Carolina, operated WCLN, a daytime-only station, and WCLN-FM prior to the 1991 purchase of the 16-year-old stations by Willis Broadcasting Corp. of Norfolk, Virginia. The stations' format would be adult contemporary music and oldies.

WCLN and WCLN-FM were Christian radio when the FM station increased its power from 3,000 to 25,000 watts to better cover Fayetteville. Curt Nunnery of WFLB became sales manager.

By 1997, WCLN was airing southern gospel music separately from the FM, and by 2000, WCLN was playing oldies.

In 2012, WCLN played oldies along with locally oriented programming including Clinton High School sports. The hosts of the morning show could be seen through glass from the outside, as is true for the Today show.
