= Chattanooga, Tennessee =

City in the United States

- City
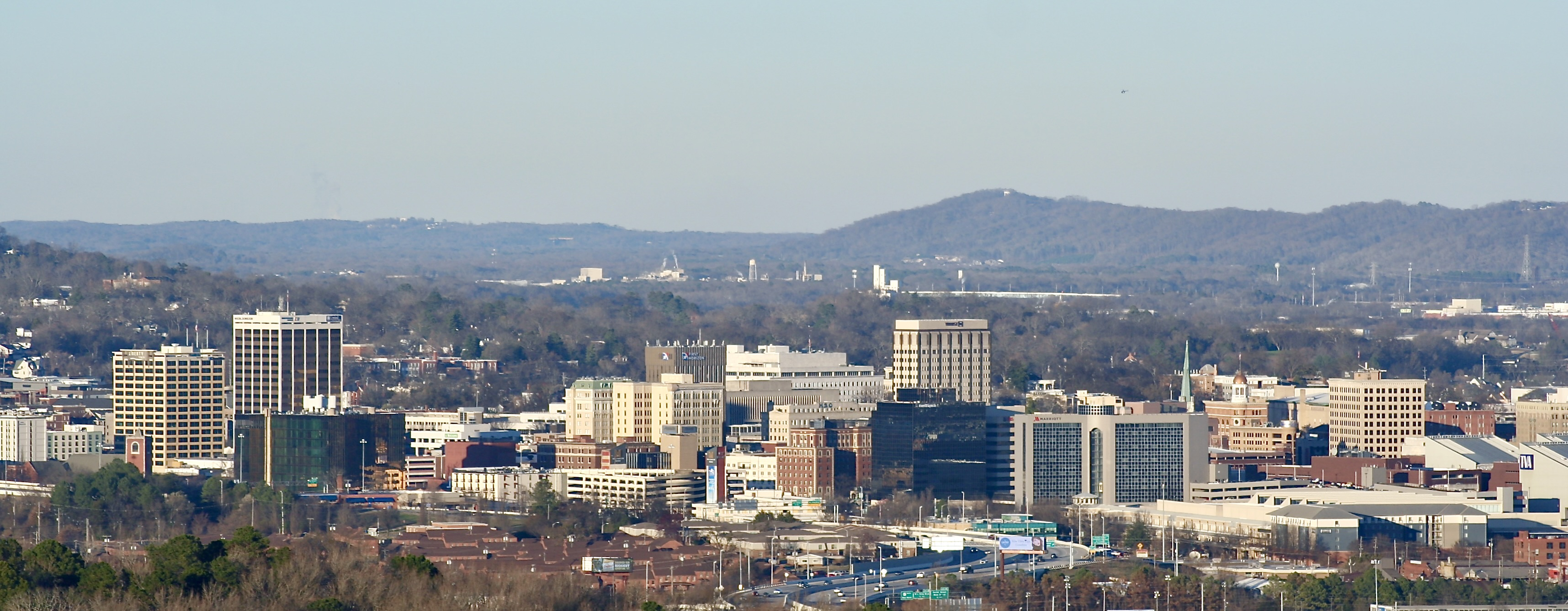
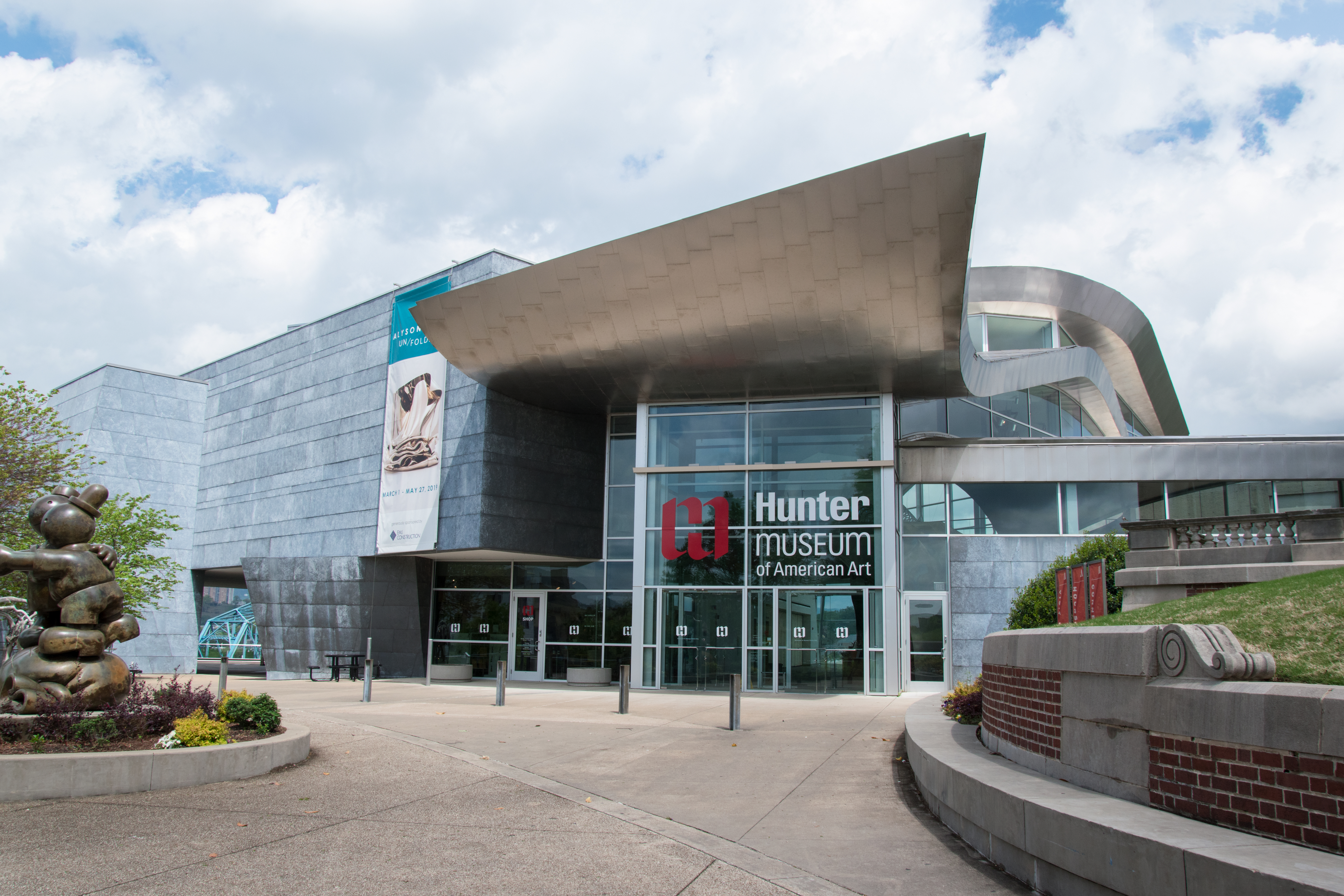
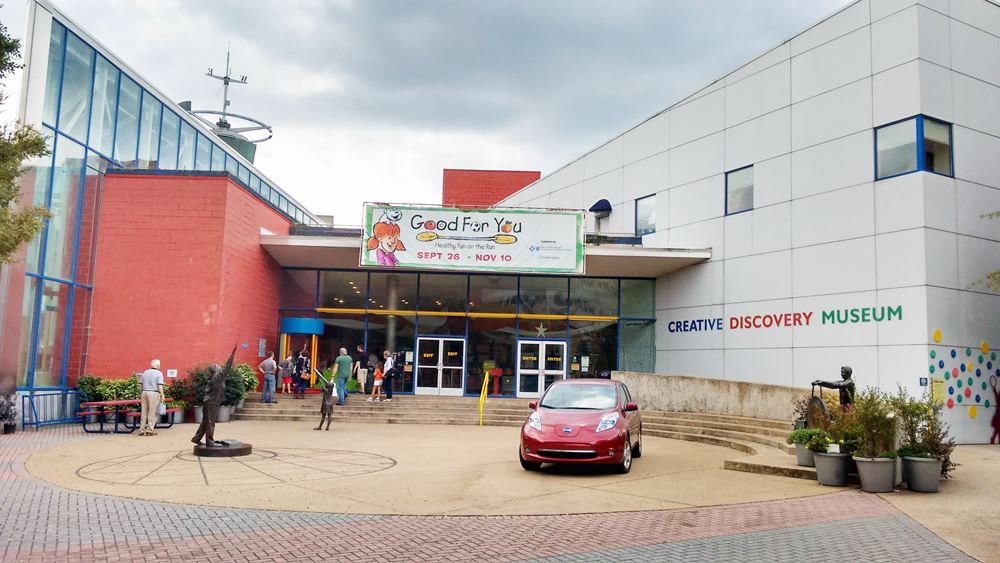
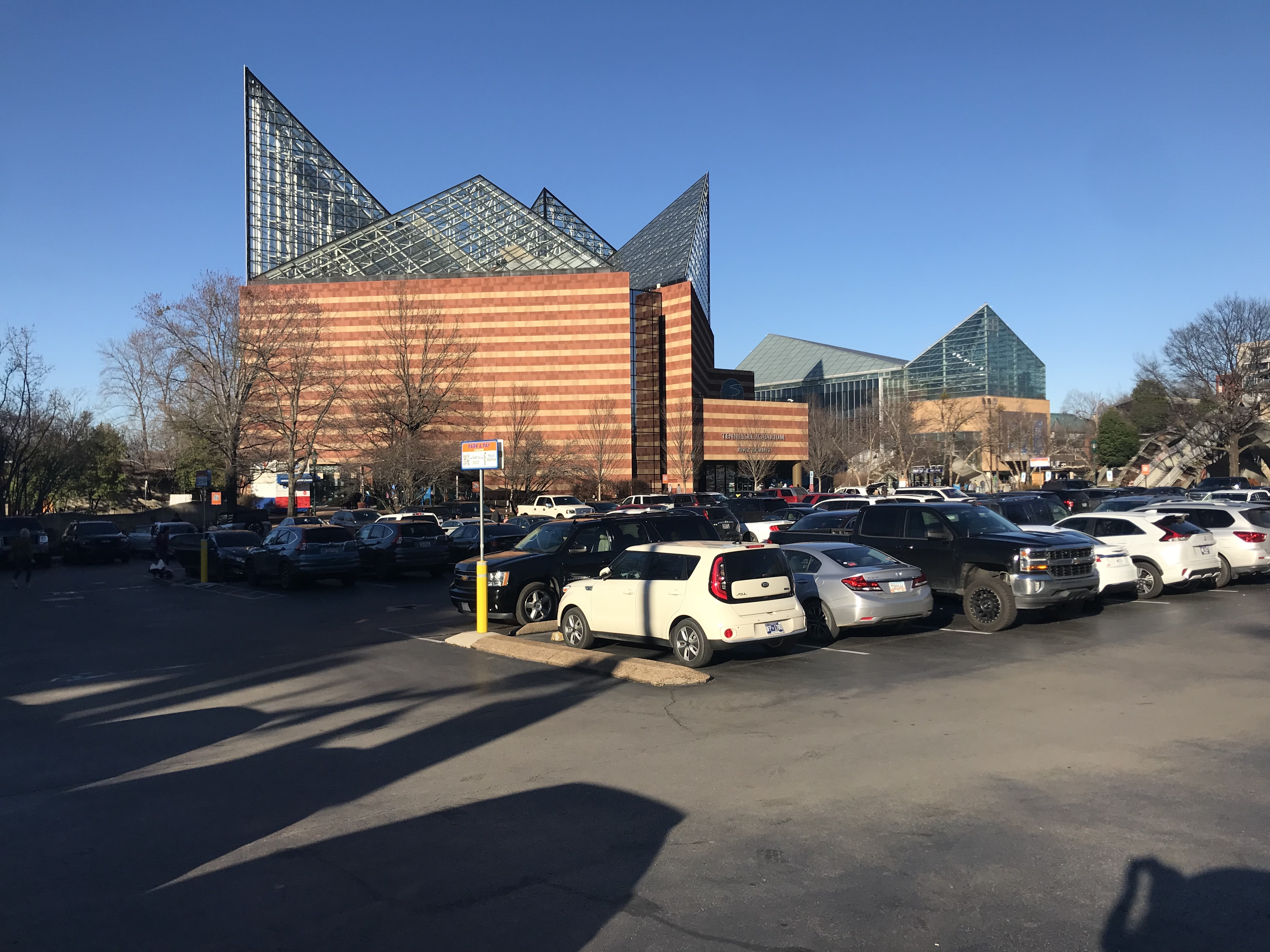
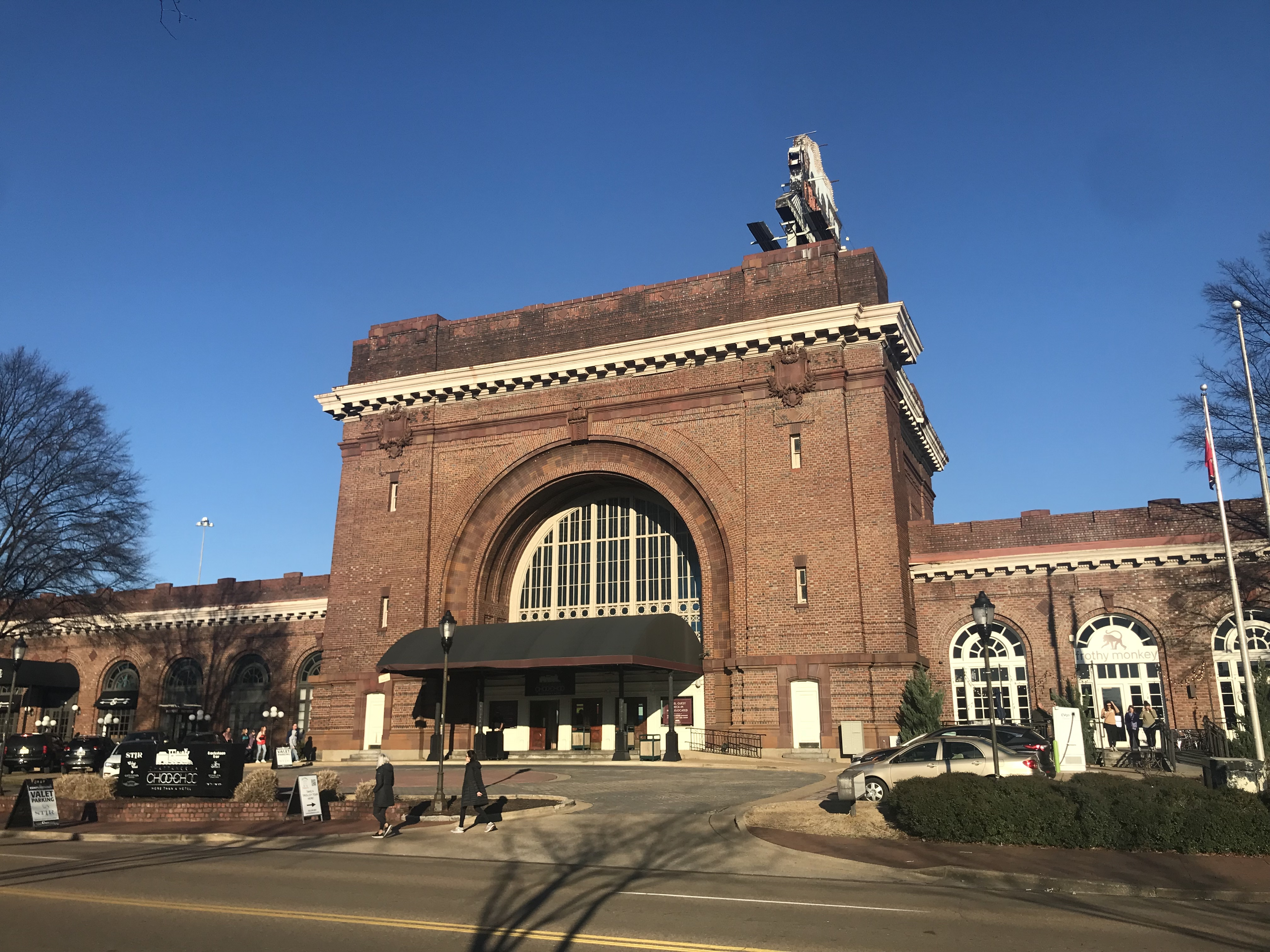
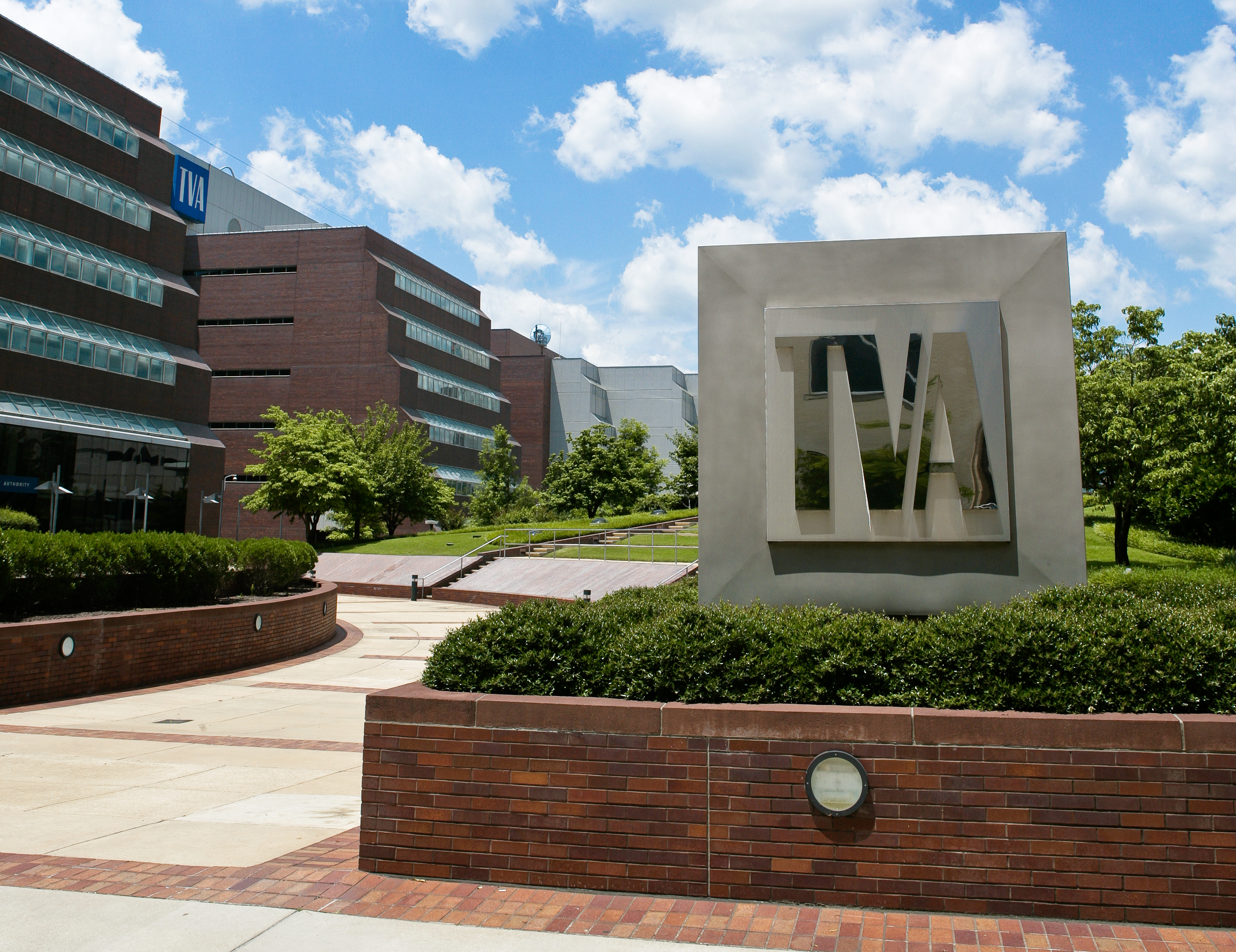
- Chattanooga skyline in 2023 Hunter Museum of American Art Creative Discovery Museum Tennessee Aquarium Choo-Choo Hotel TVA offices

- Flag Seal Logo
- Nicknames: Scenic City (official); Chatt, Chattown, Gig City, Nooga, and River City
- Interactive map of Chattanooga, Tennessee
- Location within Tennessee Location within the United States
- Coordinates: 35.065958°N 85.248386°W
- Country: United States
- State: Tennessee
- County: Hamilton
- Founded: 1816
- Incorporated: December 20, 1839

Government
  - Type: Mayor–council
  - Mayor: Tim Kelly (I)

Area
  - City: 150.080 sq mi (388.705 km^{2})
  - Land: 142.352 sq mi (368.691 km^{2})
  - Water: 7.727 sq mi (20.014 km^{2}) 5.15%
- Elevation: 676 ft (206 m)

Population (2020)
  - City: 181,099
  - Estimate (2025): 194,144 ▲
  - Rank: US: 137th TN: 4th
  - Density: 1,272.19/sq mi (491.195/km^{2})
  - Urban: 398,569 (US: 105th)
  - Urban density: 1,366/sq mi (527.6/km^{2})
  - Metro: 588,050 (US: 99th)
  - Metro density: 282/sq mi (108.7/km^{2})
  - Combined: 1,016,333 (US: 62nd)
  - Combined density: 185/sq mi (71.3/km^{2})
- Demonym: Chattanoogan
- Time zone: UTC–5 (Eastern (EST))
  - Summer (DST): UTC–4 (EDT)
- ZIP Codes: 37401–37412, 37414–37416, 37419, 37421–37422, 37424, 37450
- Area codes: 423 and 729
- FIPS code: 47-14000
- GNIS feature ID: 2404035
- Airport: Chattanooga Metropolitan Airport
- Public transportation: CARTA
- Waterways: Tennessee River
- Website: chattanooga.gov

Chattanooga (/ˌtʃætəˈnuːɡə/ CHAT-ə-NOO-gə) is a city in Hamilton County, Tennessee, United States, and its county seat. It is located along the Tennessee River and borders Georgia to the south. The population was 181,099 at the 2020 census, and was estimated at 191,496 in 2024. It is Tennessee's fourth-most populous city and one of the two principal cities of East Tennessee, along with Knoxville. It anchors the Chattanooga metropolitan area, Tennessee's fourth-largest metropolitan statistical area, as well as a larger three-state area that includes southeastern Tennessee, northwestern Georgia, and northeastern Alabama.

Chattanooga was a crucial city during the American Civil War due to the multiple railroads that converge there. After the war, the railroads allowed for the city to grow into one of the Southeastern United States' largest heavy industrial hubs. Today, major industry that drives the economy includes automotive, advanced manufacturing, food and beverage production, healthcare, insurance, tourism, and back office and corporate headquarters. Chattanooga remains a transit hub in the present day, served by multiple Interstate highways and railroad lines. It is 118 miles (190 km) northwest of Atlanta, Georgia, 112 miles (180 km) southwest of Knoxville, Tennessee, 134 miles (216 km) southeast of Nashville, Tennessee, 102 miles (164 km) east-northeast of Huntsville, Alabama, and 147 miles (237 km) northeast of Birmingham, Alabama.

Divided by the Tennessee River, Chattanooga is at the transition between the ridge-and-valley Appalachians and the Cumberland Plateau, both of which are part of the larger Appalachian Mountains. Its official nickname is the "Scenic City", alluding to the surrounding mountains, ridges, and valleys. Unofficial nicknames include "River City", "Chatt", "Nooga", "Chattown", and "Gig City", the latter referring to Chattanooga's claim of having the fastest internet service in the Western Hemisphere.

Chattanooga is internationally known from the 1941 hit song "Chattanooga Choo Choo" by Glenn Miller and his orchestra. It is home to the University of Tennessee at Chattanooga (UTC) and Chattanooga State Community College.

== History ==
=== Early history ===
The first inhabitants of the Chattanooga area were Native Americans. Sites dating back to the Upper Paleolithic period (c. 10,000 BCE) show continuous human occupation through the Archaic, Woodland, Mississippian/Muskogean/Yuchi (900–1714 CE), and Cherokee (1776–1838) periods. The Chickamauga Mound near the mouth of the Chickamauga Creek is the oldest (c. 750 CE) remaining visible art in Chattanooga.

The Citico town and mound site was the most significant Mississippian/Muscogee landmark in Chattanooga up to 1915. The first part of the name "Chattanooga" derives from the Muskogean word cvto /chắtȯ/ – 'rock'. The latter may be derived from a regional suffix -nuga meaning dwelling or dwelling place. It is also believed to be derived from the Creek Indian word Chat-to-to-noog-gee, meaning 'rock rising to a point', which is speculated to be a reference to Lookout Mountain.

The earliest Cherokee occupation of the area dates from 1776, when Dragging Canoe separated himself from the main tribe to establish resistance to European settlement during the Cherokee–American wars. In 1816 John Ross, who later became Principal Chief, established Ross's Landing. Located along what is now Broad Street, it became one of the centers of Cherokee Nation settlement, which also extended into Georgia and Alabama.

In 1838, the U.S. government forced the Cherokees, along with other Native Americans, to relocate to the area designated as Indian Territory, in what is now the state of Oklahoma. Their journey west became known as the "Trail of Tears" for their exile and fatalities along the way. The U.S. Army used Ross's Landing as the site of one of three large internment camps, or "emigration depots", where Native Americans were held before the journey on the Trail of Tears.

In 1839, the community of Ross's Landing incorporated as the city of Chattanooga. The city grew quickly, initially benefiting from a location well-suited for river commerce. With the arrival of the railroad in 1850, Chattanooga became a boom town. The city was known as the site "where cotton meets corn," referring to its location along the cultural boundary between the mountain communities of southern Appalachia and the cotton-growing states to the south.

Battles for Chattanooga, November 24–25, 1863

=== Civil War ===
During the American Civil War, Chattanooga was a center of battle. Chattanooga served as a hub connecting fifty percent of the Confederacy's arsenals, those being located in Atlanta, Augusta, Columbus, and Macon. Chattanooga's railroads were vital to the Confederacy's transportation of raw material to processing plants for producing small arms munitions. During the Chickamauga Campaign, Union artillery bombarded Chattanooga as a diversion and occupied it on September 9, 1863. Following the Battle of Chickamauga, the defeated Union Army retreated to safety in Chattanooga. On November 23, 1863, the Battles for Chattanooga began when Union forces led by Major General Ulysses S. Grant reinforced troops at Chattanooga and advanced to Orchard Knob against Confederate troops besieging the city. The next day, the Battle of Lookout Mountain was fought, driving the Confederates off the mountain. On November 25, Grant's army routed the Confederates in the Battle of Missionary Ridge. In regard to victories won by the Union, Chattanooga marks one of three defining moments that turned the Civil War in their favor. The Battle of Gettysburg brought the streak of victories obtained by the Confederacy to an end, while the Siege of Vicksburg split the Confederacy itself in half, while Chattanooga served as the doorway to the Deep South. These battles were followed the next spring by the Atlanta campaign, beginning just over the nearby state line in Georgia and moving southeastward. After the war ended, the city became a major railroad hub and industrial and manufacturing center.

=== 1867 flood ===
The largest flood in Chattanooga's history occurred in 1867, before the Tennessee Valley Authority (TVA) system was created in 1933 by Congress. The flood crested at 58 feet (18 m) and completely inundated the city. Since the completion of the reservoir system, the highest Chattanooga flood stage has been nearly 37 feet (11 m), which occurred in 1973. Without regulation, the flood would have crested at 52.4 feet (16.0 m). Chattanooga was a major priority in the design of the TVA reservoir system and remains a major operating priority in the 21st century.

=== 20th century ===
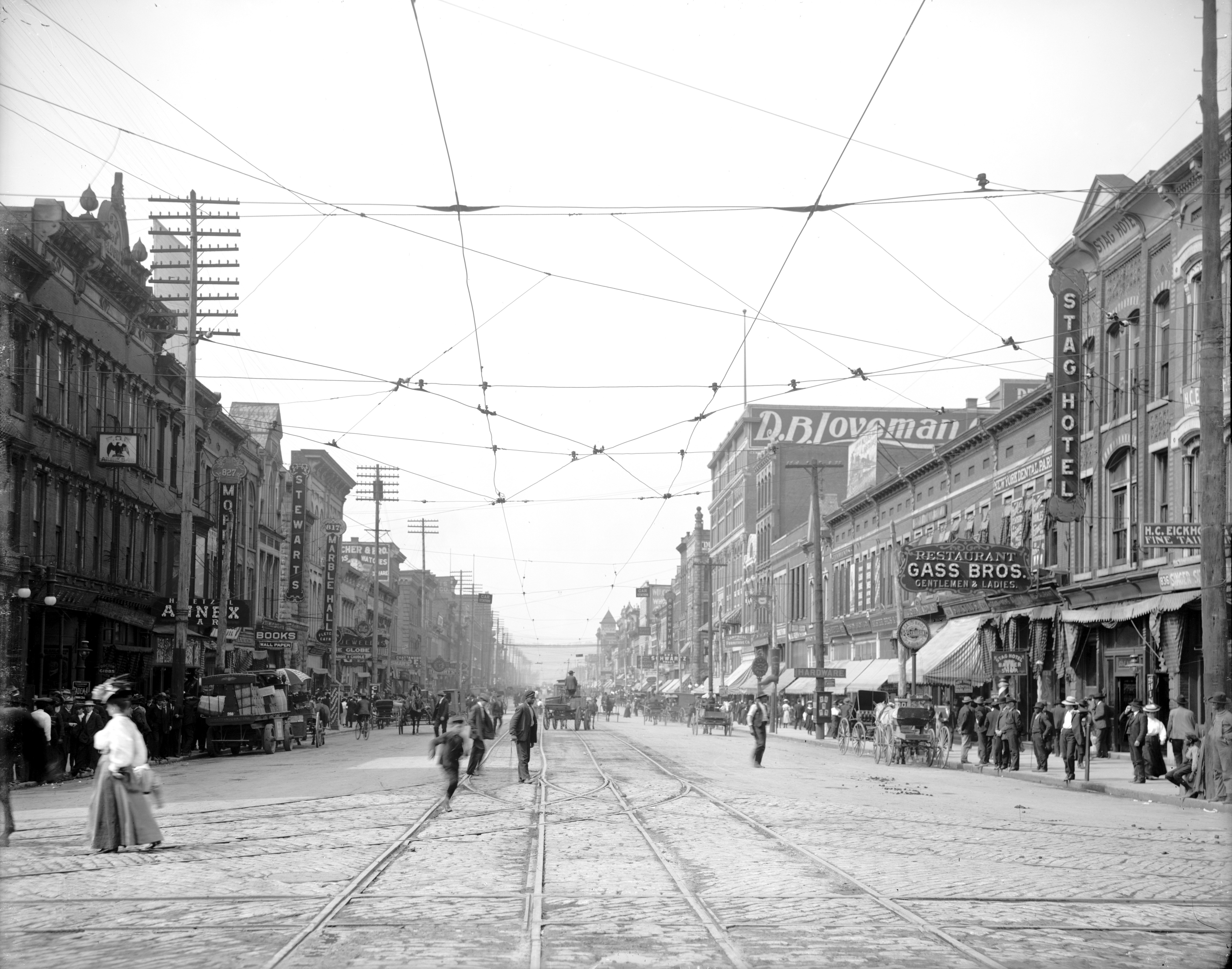
Market Street in 1907

In December 1906, Chattanooga was in the national headlines in United States v. Shipp, as the United States Supreme Court, in the only criminal trial in its history, ruled that Hamilton County Sheriff Joseph H. Shipp had violated Ed Johnson's civil rights when Shipp allowed a mob to enter the Hamilton County jail and lynch Johnson on the Walnut Street Bridge.

Chattanooga grew with the entry of the United States in the First World War in 1917; the nearest training camp was in Fort Oglethorpe, Georgia. The Influenza pandemic of 1918 closed local movie theaters and pool halls. By the 1930s, Chattanooga was known as the "Dynamo of Dixie", inspiring the 1941 Glenn Miller big-band swing song "Chattanooga Choo Choo". Through Mayor P.R. Olgiati's efforts, Chattanooga became the first city in Tennessee to have a completed interstate highway system in the latter 1960s. In February 1958, Chattanooga became one of the smallest cities in the country with three VHF television stations: WROM-TV (now WTVC-TV) channel 9 (ABC), WRGP-TV (now WRCB-TV) channel 3 (NBC), and WDEF-TV channel 12 (CBS).

The same mountains that provide Chattanooga's scenic backdrop also trap industrial pollutants, which settle over the city. In 1969, the federal government declared that Chattanooga had the dirtiest air in the nation. Like other early industrial cities, Chattanooga entered the 1970s with serious socioeconomic challenges, including job layoffs because of de-industrialization, deteriorating city infrastructure, racial tensions, and social division. Chattanooga's population increased by nearly 50,000 in the 1970s. However, this was mostly because the city annexed nearby residential areas. By the mid-1980s, local leaders launched Vision 2000, an effort to revitalize and reinvent Chattanooga's culture and economy. Chattanooga's population declined by more than 10% in the 1980s, but regained it over the next two decades, the only major U.S. city to do so in that period.

==== Civil Rights Movement ====
The civil rights movement of Chattanooga began in 1960 when teenage students of Howard High School, inspired by activists in Nashville and Greensboro, began to organize a similar sit-in protest. Class President Paul Walker, Lehman Pierce and as many as 200 other black students organized peaceful sit-ins at four businesses along one block in downtown Chattanooga. White youth mobs responded with agitation, inflammatory language and violence. By the third day, Mayor Rudy Olgiatti instructed the fire department to utilize water hoses on crowds becoming the first city to utilize this tactic against protesters. Three months later the city would agree to desegregate the downtown businesses.

Unlike many southern cities, the assassination of Martin Luther King Jr. did not lead to riots in Chattanooga. Mayor Kelley and Police Commissioner Turner met with young people to defuse the situation and bought the protesters lunch. The frustrated youths voiced their complaints about racial injustice in Chattanooga, but were convinced to peacefully disperse.

In 1971, John Franklin Sr. became the first African-American elected official of Chattanooga. However racial tensions related to poverty and education continued to simmer. In the same year, a cancelled concert refusing to give ticket refunds sparked a four-day riot of black youth. An all-night curfew was called and close to 2,000 National Guard troops arrived in the city, setting up a post at City Hall. The unrest led to 1 death and 300 arrests.

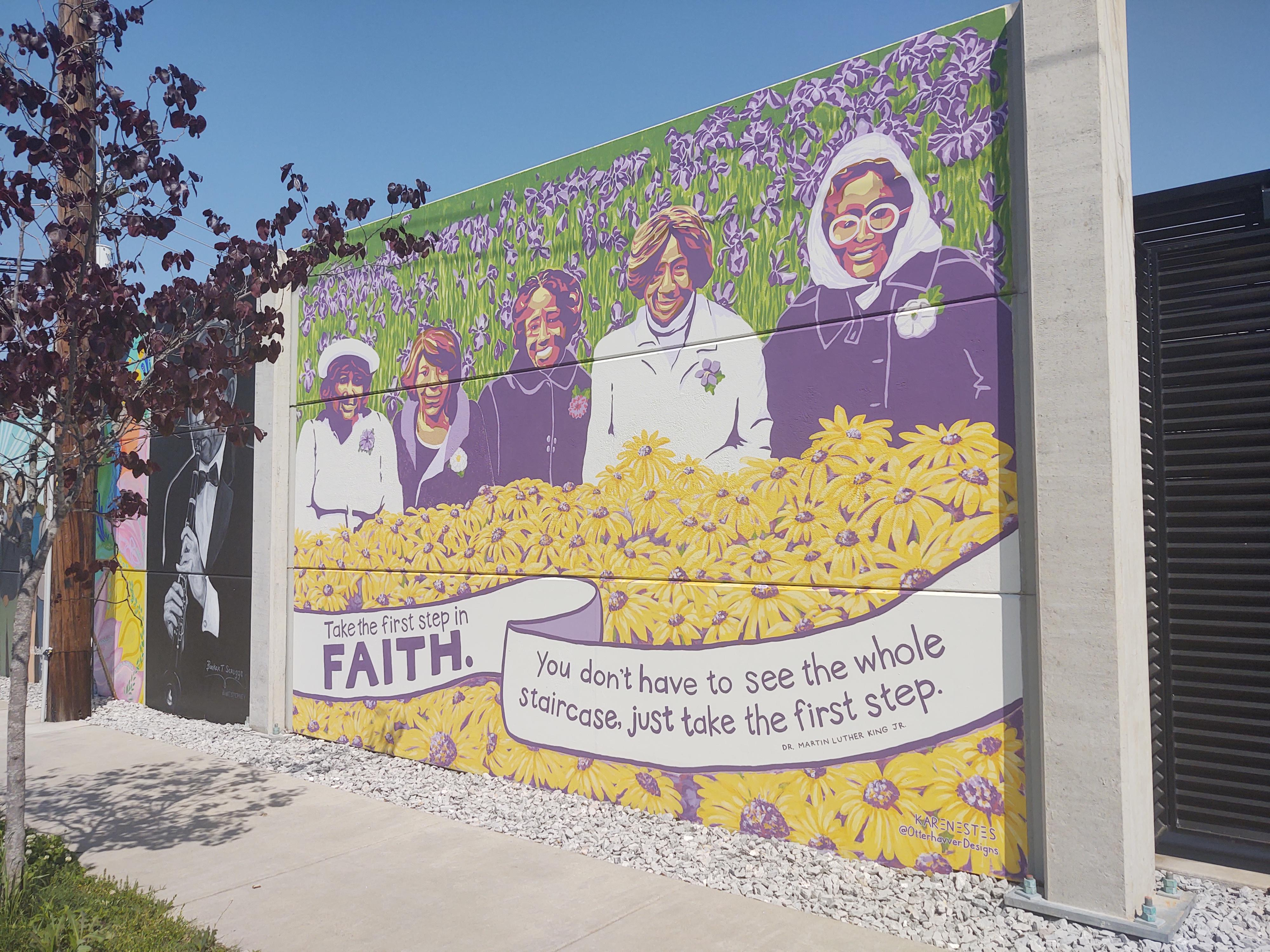
A downtown mural memorializing the five Black women who were injured during the 1980 Klan shooting.

On April 19, 1980, three Ku Klux Klan members rode down historic E. 9th Street, M. L. King Blvd. today, and opened fire on five black women: Viola Ellison, Lela Mae Evans, Katherine O. Johnson, Opal Lee Jackson and Fannie Crumsey. All of the women survived. When an all-white jury acquitted the three Klan members for their crime, Chattanooga erupted into four nights of rioting. Not deterred by the jury verdict, the five women went on to be plaintiffs in a historic civil lawsuit against the Klan. In 1982, the federal courts ordered the Klan to pay the women $535,000 on account of the attack. This case created the legal strategy for dismantling the Klan across the country in the following years.

In 1987, the city's at-large voting process was challenged on the basis that it marginalized the voting power of Black voters. The issue was initially presented by Lorenzo Ervin, Annie Thomas and Maxine Cousin to the ACLU in Atlanta. Following the case of Brown v. Board of Commissioners of Chattanooga, the city terminated the at-large voting system.

=== 21st century ===
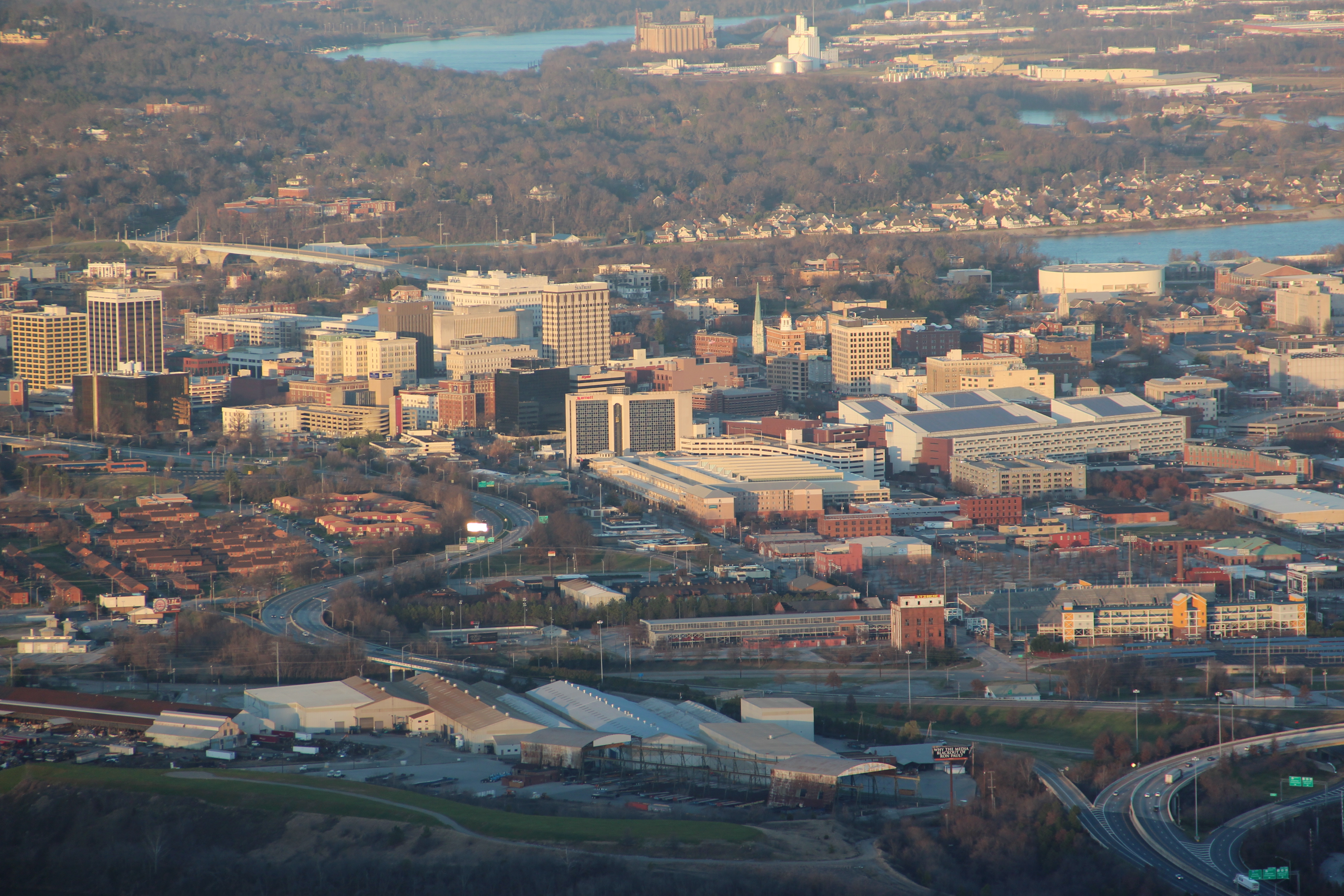
Downtown Chattanooga, viewed from Lookout Mountain

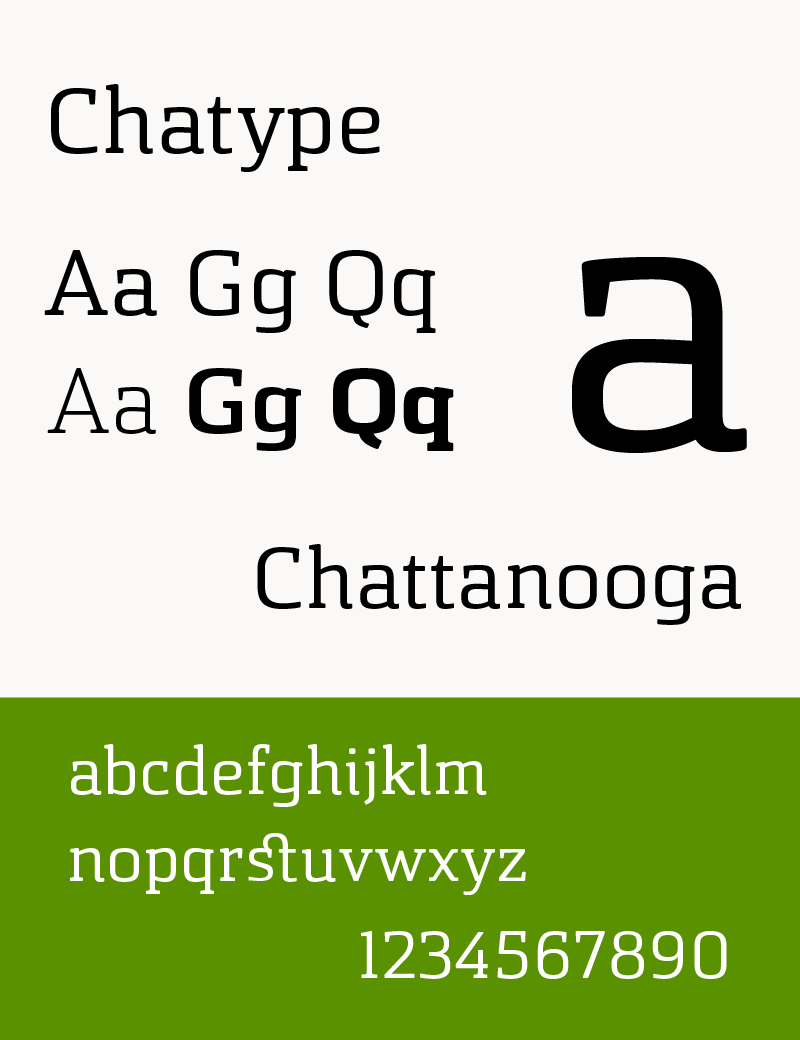
Chatype, the typeface used by Chattanooga

Chattanooga launched the first government-provided one-gigabit-per-second Internet service in the United States in September 2010, provided through the city-owned utility EPB.

In August 2012, Chattanooga developed its own typeface, called Chatype, which marks the first time a municipality has its own typeface in the United States and the first crowd-funded, custom-made typeface in the world.

On July 16, 2015, five people — four U.S. Marines and one sailor — were murdered and two more were wounded in shootings at two U.S. military facilities in Chattanooga. The perpetrator was Muhammad Youssef Abdulazeez, an Islamic terrorist.

On November 21, 2016, a school bus carrying students from Woodmore Elementary School crashed in the Brainerd neighborhood, killing 6 and injuring 23. In March 2018, the driver, an employee of Durham School Services, was convicted of six counts of criminally negligent homicide, 11 counts of reckless aggravated assault, seven counts of assault, reckless endangerment, reckless driving and illegally using his phone while driving. The crash reignited the debate about whether seat belts should be required in school buses.

On June 5, 2022, there was a mass shooting outside a night club in Chattanooga that left three dead and injured 14 others.

== Geography ==
According to the United States Census Bureau, the city has a total area of 150.080 square miles (388.71 km^{2}), of which 142.352 square miles (368.69 km^{2}) is land and 7.728 square miles (20.02 km^{2}) (5.15%) is water.

The most prominent natural features in and around Chattanooga are the Tennessee River and the surrounding mountains. The Tennessee River is impounded by the Chickamauga Dam north of the downtown area. The city is nestled between the southwestern Ridge-and-valley Appalachians and the foot of Walden's Ridge; the river separates the ridge from the western side of downtown. Several miles east, the city is bisected by Missionary Ridge. The downtown area sits at an elevation of approximately 676 feet (206 m), one of the lowest elevations in East Tennessee.

=== Cityscape ===
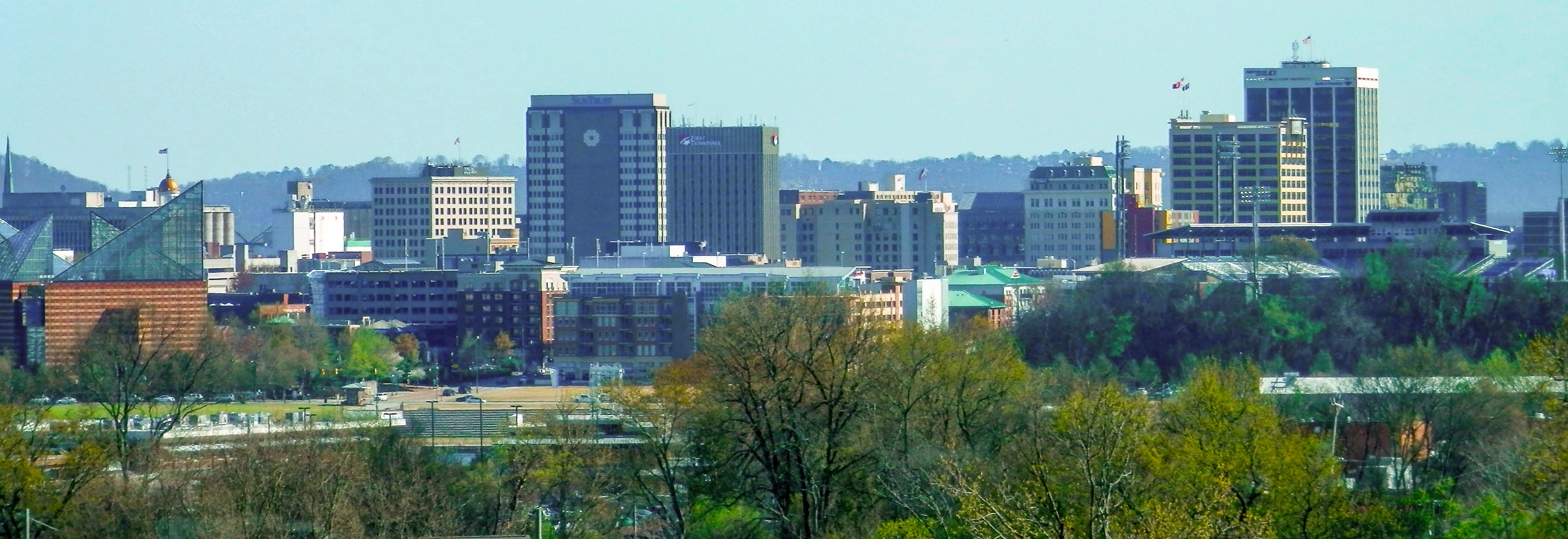
Downtown Chattanooga

Downtown Chattanooga has a wide variety of entertainment, dining, cultural and architectural attractions, including the Tennessee Aquarium, opened in 1992; the Creative Discovery Museum, opened in 1995; and the historic Walnut Street Bridge, which was reopened in 1993, but was closed again for renovation in March, 2025. The downtown footprint is bounded by interstate highway I-24 on the south to Frazier Avenue in the Northshore, as well as US highway 27 in the west to Central Avenue in the east.

The modern downtown skyline is dominated by the Aquarium, the 21 story Republic Centre (Chattanooga's tallest building), John C. Portman Jr.'s the Westin (Gold Building), the James Building (Chattanooga's first skyscraper), and The Block, a climbing gym with 5,000 square feet of functional climbing space. Chattanooga has buildings with historical significance, such as The Read House Hotel (the longest continuously operating hotel in the Southeastern United States), the Chattanooga Choo-Choo Hotel (a converted railroad terminal), the Maclellan Building, the Dome Building (once the home to the Chattanooga Times), and the Tivoli Theatre. The BlueCross BlueShield of Tennessee headquarters, atop Cameron Hill, is the second-largest LEED Gold-certified corporate campus in the nation.

Downtown Chattanooga has four main bridges over the Tennessee River: the temporarily closed Walnut Street Bridge, the Market Street Bridge, the Olgiati Bridge, and the Veterans Memorial Bridge. These bridges allow pedestrians to connect the Riverfront and Northshore to the Tennessee Riverwalk and Bluff View Art District. Downtown Chattanooga parks include Coolidge Park, Renaissance Park, Miller Park, Miller Plaza and Main Terrain Art Park. The Martin Luther King District runs parallel to the University of Tennessee at Chattanooga's campus and features the largest mural in Chattanooga. The 40,000-square-foot mural was created by Philadelphia-based muralist Meg Saligman and seven other local artists.

==== Downtown revitalization ====
In late 20th and early 21st centuries, substantial private and governmental resources have been invested in transforming the city's tarnished image. In 1993, restoration of the Walnut Street Bridge was completed. An excellent specimen of the Camelback truss bridge, it is the oldest surviving bridge of its kind in the Southeastern United States, having been built in 1891. Efforts to improve the city include the "21st Century Waterfront Plan" – a $120 million redevelopment of the Chattanooga waterfront area, which was completed in 2005. The Tennessee Aquarium, which opened in 1992, has become a major waterfront attraction that has helped to spur neighborhood development. Since the opening of the aquarium, downtown Chattanooga has received over $5 billion of private investment, including nearly $1 billion from 2014 to 2018.

The city has won three national awards for outstanding "livability", and nine Gunther Blue Ribbon Awards for excellence in housing and consolidated planning. Public art experts chose Passageways 2.0 City Thread from among 50 outstanding public art projects created in 2018 through the Public Art Network Year in Review program, a national program that recognizes compelling public art. In addition to winning various national and regional awards, Chattanooga has been in the national limelight numerous times. Chattanooga was the profile city of the August 2007 edition of US Airways Magazine. Chattanooga-based businesses have been recognized for their investment in solar energy. In December 2009, Chattanooga was ranked 8th out of America's 100 largest metro areas for the best "Bang For Your Buck" city, according to Forbes magazine, which measured overall affordability, housing rates, and more.

=== Neighborhoods ===
Chattanooga has many buildings and three neighborhoods on the National Register of Historic Places: Ferger Place, Fort Wood, and St. Elmo. Additionally, Chattanooga has several local historic districts: Battery Place, Glenwood, Missionary Ridge, M.L. King, and Stringer's Ridge. Four of these are formally managed as local historic districts by the city.

- Ferger Place
- Fort Wood
- Highland Park
- Hixson
- Lupton City
- Missionary Ridge
- St. Elmo
- Tiftonia (also known as Lookout Valley)
- Tyner

=== Notable suburbs ===
- Apison, Tennessee
- Chickamauga, Georgia
- Collegedale, Tennessee
- East Brainerd, Tennessee
- East Ridge, Tennessee
- Fort Oglethorpe, Georgia
- Harrison, Tennessee
- LaFayette, Georgia
- Lookout Mountain, Georgia
- Lookout Mountain, Tennessee
- Ooltewah, Tennessee
- Red Bank, Tennessee
- Ridgeside, Tennessee
- Ringgold, Georgia
- Rossville, Georgia
- Sale Creek, Tennessee
- Signal Mountain, Tennessee
- Soddy-Daisy, Tennessee
- Trenton, Georgia
- Walden, Tennessee

=== Climate ===
Chattanooga, like much of Tennessee, has a four-season humid subtropical climate (Köppen Cfa). Winter days are usually mild, but most years have at least one day (average 3.2) where the high remains at or below freezing. Snowfall is highly variable from year to year. 11 inches (28 cm) were recorded between January 9–10, 2011. The average snowiest month is February which corresponds with the annual peak in nor'easter activity. Summers are hot and humid, with a July daily mean of 80.0 °F (26.7 °C) and 52 days annually with 90 °F (32 °C) or greater temperatures. Chattanooga is the sixth fastest warming city in the United States due to climate change.

Average annual precipitation is over 52 inches (1,300 mm). On average, November through March represents an extended relatively wet period, because of Chattanooga's frequent placement (in the winter season) in a zone of conflict between warm, moist air from the Gulf of Mexico and cold, dry air from Canada, amplified by jet-stream energy and abundant Gulf moisture. July presents a secondary maximum in precipitation, due to frequent thunderstorm activity. Despite the mountains that surround the city, Chattanooga has been affected by tornadoes. These tornadoes include the 2011 Super Outbreak, which impacted the city and nearby locations, including Apison and Cherokee Valley in Catoosa County, Georgia, where fifteen people died, eight in Apison and seven in Cherokee Valley. An EF3 tornado struck southeastern portions of Chattanooga on the night of April 12, 2020, and caused significant damage and three fatalities.

Chattanooga is located within USDA plant hardiness zones 7b and 8a. Due to the climate being warmer than far north areas of Tennessee, it supports various cold hardy palm trees.

Climate data for Chattanooga Metropolitan Airport, Tennessee (1991–2020 normals, (Note: Mean monthly maxima and minima (i.e. the expected highest and lowest temperature readings at any point during the year or given month) calculated based on data at said location from 1991 to 2020.) extremes 1879–present (Note: Official records for Chattanooga kept at the Weather Bureau downtown from January 1879 to June 1940 and at Lovell Field since July 1940.))
Month	Jan	Feb	Mar	Apr	May	Jun	Jul	Aug	Sep	Oct	Nov	Dec	Year
Record high °F (°C)	78 (26)	82 (28)	89 (32)	93 (34)	99 (37)	107 (42)	107 (42)	105 (41)	104 (40)	100 (38)	86 (30)	78 (26)	107 (42)
Mean maximum °F (°C)	68.8 (20.4)	73.0 (22.8)	80.6 (27.0)	86.0 (30.0)	90.5 (32.5)	95.2 (35.1)	97.1 (36.2)	96.4 (35.8)	93.5 (34.2)	85.8 (29.9)	76.8 (24.9)	69.3 (20.7)	98.3 (36.8)
Mean daily maximum °F (°C)	51.0 (10.6)	55.6 (13.1)	64.1 (17.8)	73.6 (23.1)	81.0 (27.2)	87.6 (30.9)	90.5 (32.5)	89.8 (32.1)	84.3 (29.1)	74.1 (23.4)	62.0 (16.7)	53.2 (11.8)	72.2 (22.3)
Daily mean °F (°C)	41.7 (5.4)	45.6 (7.6)	53.2 (11.8)	61.7 (16.5)	70.0 (21.1)	77.4 (25.2)	80.7 (27.1)	80.0 (26.7)	73.9 (23.3)	62.7 (17.1)	51.2 (10.7)	44.3 (6.8)	61.9 (16.6)
Mean daily minimum °F (°C)	32.4 (0.2)	35.6 (2.0)	42.2 (5.7)	49.9 (9.9)	59.0 (15.0)	67.3 (19.6)	71.0 (21.7)	70.2 (21.2)	63.6 (17.6)	51.4 (10.8)	40.3 (4.6)	35.3 (1.8)	51.5 (10.8)
Mean minimum °F (°C)	14.9 (−9.5)	19.6 (−6.9)	25.5 (−3.6)	34.3 (1.3)	44.1 (6.7)	56.9 (13.8)	63.4 (17.4)	61.9 (16.6)	50.3 (10.2)	35.1 (1.7)	25.9 (−3.4)	20.8 (−6.2)	12.9 (−10.6)
Record low °F (°C)	−10 (−23)	−10 (−23)	2 (−17)	25 (−4)	34 (1)	39 (4)	51 (11)	50 (10)	36 (2)	22 (−6)	4 (−16)	−2 (−19)	−10 (−23)
Average precipitation inches (mm)	5.02 (128)	5.03 (128)	5.34 (136)	4.87 (124)	3.94 (100)	4.18 (106)	5.08 (129)	3.67 (93)	4.23 (107)	3.59 (91)	4.80 (122)	5.25 (133)	55.00 (1,397)
Average snowfall inches (cm)	1.0 (2.5)	1.2 (3.0)	1.1 (2.8)	0.0 (0.0)	0.0 (0.0)	0.0 (0.0)	0.0 (0.0)	0.0 (0.0)	0.0 (0.0)	0.0 (0.0)	0.0 (0.0)	0.3 (0.76)	3.6 (9.1)
Average precipitation days (≥ 0.01 in)	10.6	11.1	11.4	10.1	10.6	11.4	11.9	9.4	7.9	7.9	9.1	11.3	122.7
Average snowy days (≥ 0.1 in)	0.7	1.1	0.3	0.0	0.0	0.0	0.0	0.0	0.0	0.0	0.0	0.3	2.4
Average relative humidity (%)	71.2	68.2	65.9	63.8	71.5	73.1	74.9	76.0	77.0	74.6	73.5	72.9	71.9
Mean monthly sunshine hours	147.0	155.6	200.5	240.2	275.6	275.5	265.2	256.8	227.9	218.8	158.7	140.4	2,562.2
Percentage possible sunshine	47	51	54	61	64	63	60	62	61	63	51	46	58
Source: NOAA (relative humidity and sun 1961–1990)

=== Time zone ===
Chattanooga uses the Eastern Time Zone. Counties directly to its west (in both Tennessee and Alabama) use the Central Time Zone.

== Demographics ==
Historical population
Census	Pop.	Note	%±
1860	2,545		—
1870	6,093		139.4%
1880	12,892		111.6%
1890	29,100		125.7%
1900	30,154		3.6%
1910	44,604		47.9%
1920	57,895		29.8%
1930	119,798		106.9%
1940	128,163		7.0%
1950	131,041		2.2%
1960	130,009		−0.8%
1970	119,082		−8.4%
1980	169,565		42.4%
1990	152,466		−10.1%
2000	155,554		2.0%
2010	167,674		7.8%
2020	181,099		8.0%
2025 (est.)	194,144		7.2%
U.S. Decennial Census; 2020 Census

According to realtor website Zillow, the average price of a home as of December 31, 2025, in Chattanooga is $313,143.

As of the 2024 American Community Survey, there are 82,182 estimated households in Chattanooga with an average of 2.25 persons per household. The city has a median household income of $66,060. Approximately 23.0% of the city's population lives at or below the poverty line. Chattanooga has an estimated 61.5% employment rate, with 33.7% of the population holding a bachelor's degree or higher and 89.8% holding a high school diploma. The median age in the city was 42.3 years. There were 89,451 housing units at an average density of 628.38 per square mile (242.6/km^{2}). According to PODS’ 2025 Moving Trends Report, Chattanooga ranked 11th among U.S. cities with the highest number of move-ins.

The top five reported languages (people were allowed to report up to two languages, thus the figures will generally add to more than 100%) were English (86.7%), Spanish (8.2%), Indo-European (3.5%), Asian and Pacific Islander (1.3%), and Other (0.3%).

=== Racial and ethnic composition ===
Historical racial composition	1950	1960	1970	1980	1990
White	91,720 (70.0%)	86,783 (66.8%)	76,216 (64.0%)	114,741 (67.7%)	99,057 (65.0%)
Black	39,276 (30.0%)	43,141 (33.2%)	42,610 (35.8%)	53,716 (31.7%)	51,338 (33.7%)
Indian, Eskimo, and Aleut	7 (0.01%)	13 (0.01%)	67 (0.1%)	182 (0.1%)	329 (0.2%)
Asian and Pacific Islander	32 (0.02%)	64 (0.05%)	81 (0.1%)	583 (0.3%)	1,478 (1.0%)
Other race	6 (0.00%)	8 (0.01%)	108 (0.1%)	343 (0.2%)	264 (0.2%)
Hispanic or Latino (of any race)	–	–	–	1,295 (0.8%)	974 (0.6%)

Chattanooga, Tennessee – racial and ethnic composition Note: the US Census treats Hispanic/Latino as an ethnic category. This table excludes Latinos from the racial categories and assigns them to a separate category. Hispanics/Latinos may be of any race.
Race / ethnicity (NH = non-Hispanic)	Pop. 1990	Pop. 2000	Pop. 2010	Pop. 2020	% 1990	% 2000	% 2010	% 2020
White alone (NH)	98,489	91,582	93,698	98,977	64.60%	58.87%	55.88%	54.65%
Black or African American alone (NH)	51,186	55,874	58,256	52,384	33.57%	35.92%	34.74%	28.93%
Native American or Alaska Native alone (NH)	320	395	409	429	0.21%	0.25%	0.24%	0.24%
Asian alone (NH)	1,443	2,384	3,273	4,956	0.95%	1.53%	1.95%	2.74%
Native Hawaiian or Pacific Islander alone (NH)	—	83	79	60	—	0.05%	0.05%	0.03%
Other race alone (NH)	54	182	220	691	0.04%	0.12%	0.13%	0.38%
Mixed race or multiracial (NH)	—	1,773	2,514	7,021	—	1.14%	1.50%	3.88%
Hispanic or Latino (any race)	974	3,281	9,225	16,581	0.64%	2.11%	5.50%	9.16%
Total	152,466	155,554	167,674	181,099	100.00%	100.00%	100.00%	100.00%

=== 2020 census ===
As of the 2020 census, there was a population of 181,099, with 76,816 households and 43,105 families residing in the city. The population density was 1,272.17 inhabitants per square mile (491.2/km^{2}). There were 85,266 housing units at an average density of 598.97 per square mile (231.3/km^{2}).

The median age was 37.0 years, with 20.5% of residents under the age of 18 and 17.1% aged 65 or older. For every 100 females there were 90.7 males, and for every 100 females age 18 and over there were 87.5 males age 18 and over.

Of the 76,816 households, 25.1% had children under the age of 18 living in them. Of all households, 35.1% were married-couple households, 21.8% were households with a male householder and no spouse or partner present, and 35.9% were households with a female householder and no spouse or partner present. About 35.0% of all households were made up of individuals and 12.5% had someone living alone who was 65 years of age or older. There were 85,266 housing units, of which 9.9% were vacant. The homeowner vacancy rate was 1.9% and the rental vacancy rate was 9.6%.

According to the 2020 Decennial Census Demographic and Housing Characteristics data, 98.8% of residents lived in urban areas while 1.2% lived in rural areas.

=== 2010 census ===
As of the 2010 census, there was a population of 167,674, with 70,749 households and 40,384 families residing in the city. The population density was 1,222.54 inhabitants per square mile (472.0/km^{2}). There were 79,607 housing units at an average density of 580.43 per square mile (224.1/km^{2}). The racial makeup of the city was 57.97% White, 34.89% African American, 0.39% Native American, 1.97% Asian, 0.11% Pacific Islander, 2.78% from some other races and 1.89% from two or more races. Hispanic or Latino people of any race were 5.50% of the population.

There were 70,749 households, out of which 26.7% had children under the age of 18 living with them, 36% were married couples living together, 17.3% had a female householder with no husband present, and 42% were non-families. 33.5% of all households were made up of individuals, and 26% had someone living alone who was 65 years of age or older. The average household size was 2.26 and the average family size was 2.94.

In the city, the population was spread out, with 21.3% under the age of 18, 11.5% from 18 to 24, 27% from 25 to 44, 25.5% from 45 to 64, and 14.7% who were 65 years of age or older. The median age was 38.1 years. 46.1% of the population was male and 53.9% of the population was female.

The median income for a household in the city was $35,817, and the median income for a family was $43,314. Males had a median income of $36,109 versus $31,077 for females. The per capita income for the city was $23,756. About 14% of families and 16.5% of the population were below the poverty line, including 27% of those under age 18 and 13.8% of those age 65 or over.

=== Religion ===
The single largest religious group in Chattanooga is Christianity. According to 2010 statistics, the Southern Baptist Convention was the largest denomination with 225 congregations and 122,300 members; followed by the United Methodist Church with 31,500 members and 83 churches. The third-largest group of Christians identified as non-denominational congregations; and the fourth-largest organized denomination was the Church of God (Cleveland, Tennessee) with 82 churches and 17,900 members. The 5th largest Christian religious group, according to 2010 statistics, was the Roman Catholic Diocese of Knoxville, which had 12 congregations and 14,300 members. Islam has 2,200 adherents in Chattanooga.

== Economy ==
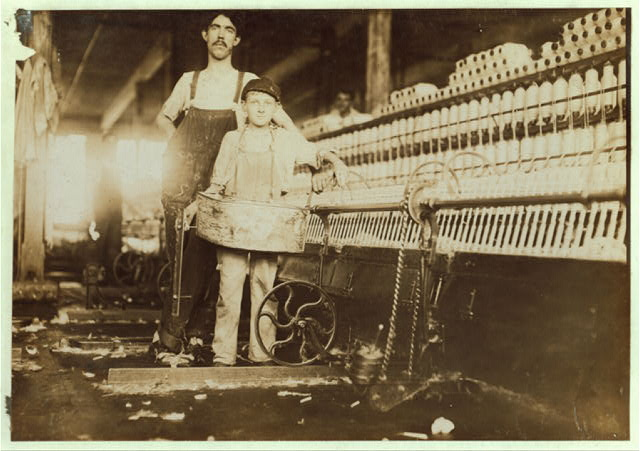
Child labor at Richmond Spinning Mill in Chattanooga, 1910. Photo by Lewis Hine.

Chattanooga's economy includes a diversified and growing mix of manufacturing and service industries.

Notable Chattanooga businesses include Access America Transport, BlueCross BlueShield of Tennessee, CBL & Associates, The Chattanooga Bakery, Sanofi, the world's first Coca-Cola bottling plant, Coker Tire, U.S. Xpress, Covenant Logistics, Double Cola, CraftWorks Restaurants & Breweries, Luken Communications, Miller & Martin, the National Model Railroad Association, PepsiCo, Reliance Partners, Republic Parking System, Tricycle Inc., and Unum. The city also hosts large branch offices of Cigna, AT&T, T-Mobile USA, and UBS. McKee Foods Corporation, the maker of nationally known Little Debbie brand snack cakes, is a privately held, family-run company headquartered in nearby Collegedale, Tennessee.

Notable companies that have manufacturing or distribution facilities in the city include Amazon.com, BASF, DuPont, Invista, Komatsu, PepsiCo, Rock-Tenn, Plantronics, Domtar, Norfolk Southern, Ferrara Candy Company (manufacturer of Brach's candies), Alco Chemical, Colonial Pipeline, and Buzzi Unicem. The William Wrigley Jr. Company has a prominent presence in Chattanooga, the sole site of production of Altoids breath mint products since 2005.

In a seminal event for Chattanooga, Volkswagen announced in July 2008 the construction of its first U.S. auto plant in over three decades, the Volkswagen Chattanooga Assembly Plant. In May 2011, Volkswagen Group of America inaugurated its plant. The $1 billion plant, opened in May 2011, served as the group's North American manufacturing headquarters. The plant, which initially employed 2,700 people, later increasing to 4,700, manufactures the Passat and the Atlas. It also has a full research and development center in downtown Chattanooga, employing some 200 engineers, the first of its kind in the South. The plant was the first new Volkswagen plant in the United States since the 1988 closure of Volkswagen Westmoreland Assembly near New Stanton, Pennsylvania. In 2019, Volkswagen Chattanooga announced plans to expand its Chattanooga-based plant to construct electric vehicles. The expansion is expected to create one thousand new jobs and $800 million in investments.

In addition to corporate business interests, there are many retail shops in Chattanooga, including two shopping malls: Hamilton Place Mall in East Brainerd and Northgate Mall in Hixson. Eastgate Mall in Brainerd used to be a shopping mall, but has changed into a multi-use office building. Tourism and Hospitality has been a growing part of Chattanooga's economy, with 2014 being the first year for Hamilton County to surpass $1 billion in revenue.

Startups have been an increasing trend, due in part to EPB's fiber optic grid. Notable venture firms based in the city are Blank Slate Ventures, Chattanooga Renaissance Fund, Lamp Post Group, SwiftWing Ventures, the Jump Fund, Dynamo Ventures, and Brickyard VC. The city is served by several incubators, notably Co.Lab, the Business Development Center, and Lamp Post Group. The Business Development Center is among the nation's largest incubators, both in square footage and in the number of startups that it supports. Co-working spaces have picked up downtown, including Society of Work and Chattanooga Workspace. Unique in the city is the startup accelerator Gigtank, which utilizes the city's gigabit capacities and focuses on 3D printing, healthcare, and smartgrid technologies. Notable startups include Quickcue (acquired by OpenTable in 2013), and Reliance Partners. Chattanooga went from zero investable capital in 2009 to over $50 million in 2014.

=== Utilities ===
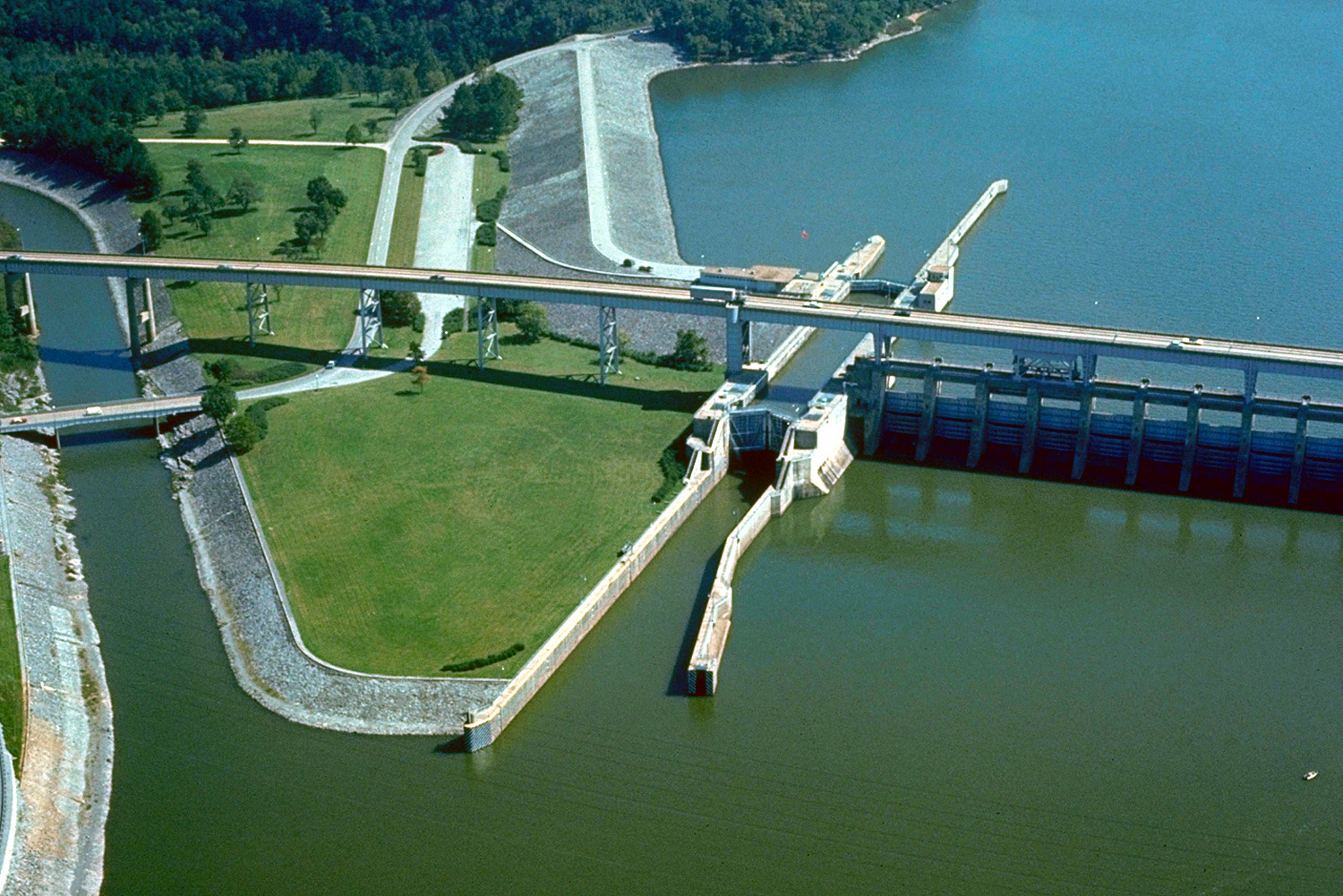
Chickamauga Lock and Dam on the Tennessee River at Chattanooga

Electric power for most of the city and surrounding area is provided by the city-run Electric Power Board (EPB). EPB also provides high-speed Internet service, TV, and telephone service to business and residential customers throughout Hamilton County, as well as parts of Bledsoe County, Bradley County, Catoosa County, Dade County, Marion County, Rhea County, Sequatchie County, and Walker County, via the nation's largest municipally owned fiber optic system. TVA operates the nearby Sequoyah Nuclear Power Plant, Chickamauga Dam, and the Raccoon Mountain Pumped-Storage Plant, all of which provide electricity to the greater Chattanooga area. TVA's corporate power generation and distribution organization is headquartered in downtown Chattanooga.

Natural gas and water are provided by the privately run Chattanooga Gas Company and Tennessee-American Water Company, respectively. In 2005, Mayor Ron Littlefield stated his desire for the city to purchase the Tennessee-American Water Company, which was sold in a public offering in 2007. Former Mayor Jon Kinsey's attempts to have the city buy control of Tennessee-American Water were defeated in court.

EPB Fiber Optics is the dominant cable and internet service provider for most areas of the city. The incumbent telephone company is AT&T Inc. However, competing phone companies, such as EPB, cellular phones, and VoIP are making inroads. A major interstate fiber optics line operated by AT&T traverses the city, making its way from Atlanta to Cincinnati. There are more choices among TV, Internet, and phone service providers for Chattanooga residents than in most other cities its size because of the intense competition between AT&T, Comcast, and EPB.

=== EPB Gigabit Network ===
Beginning in 2009 and continuing through March 2011, when Haletown, Tennessee, received service from EPB's fiber optic network, EPB began to establish its exclusive fiber optic network to its 600 sq mi (1,600 km^{2}) service area, which covers the greater Chattanooga Metropolitan Statistical Area. In September 2010, EPB became the first municipally owned utilities company in the United States to offer internet access directly to the public at speeds up to ten gigabit (10,000 megabits) per second. The network has been emulated by at least six other cities in Tennessee and studied by other cities in the U.S. and internationally. However, Tennessee state law has prevented the expansion of Chattanooga's municipal network to nearby communities that have requested connections, and that restriction was upheld in the 2016 circuit court ruling Tennessee v. FCC.

Jay Weatherill, South Australia's Premier, visited Chattanooga in January 2012 and studied the gigabit network that was supporting critical city safety functions such as police and fire communications infrastructure, equipment and applications. He also inspected wastewater management, storm water management, traffic control and medical diagnostics applications, as well as operations of a smart lighting and camera system that allows the police to control public lighting and see what is happening in heavy crime areas. The use of broadband to carry the video and control signaling has contributed to making Chattanooga's Coolidge Park a safer place to visit.

In 2011, the expansion of EPB's network became a subject of major controversy in Tennessee. The success of its network, credited with the expansion of Volkswagen's Chattanooga plant and the establishment of Amazon.com facilities in Chattanooga and Cleveland, led to a number of legal challenges by AT&T and Comcast insisting that public funds not be used to fund expansion of public networks in competition with private ones. However, according to EPB, federal agencies, electricity industry trade sources, and other press sources, the investment in the fully fiber optic network is justified by electrical system benefits alone, including early fault detection and decreases in standby power.

=== Banking ===
As of 2014, there are 27 banks operating in the Chattanooga metropolitan area, lending to financial strength. Among the larger banks are regional banks First Horizon Bank, Truist Financial, and Regions Financial Corporation, but the area also has offices from UBS, Chase, and Bank of America. Due in part to the strength and growing economic development, Chase recently shifted its East Tennessee headquarters from Knoxville to Chattanooga.

In early 2015, three locally owned banks and one in nearby Cleveland, Tennessee, were acquired by other banks. CapitalMark, formed in 2007, will be acquired by the Nashville-based Pinnacle Financial Partners for $187 million to have the fourth largest market share in the Chattanooga metro area. First Security Group, Inc, the largest Chattanooga-based bank, formed in 2000, will be acquired by the Atlanta-based Atlantic Capital Bancshares, Inc., for $160 million. Cornerstone, started in 1985, will merge with the Knoxville-based SmartBank in a stock deal. Cleveland's Southern Heritage Bank was acquired in 2014 by First Citizens National Bank in Dyersburg, Tennessee, for $32.2 million. All these mergers only leave one Chattanooga-based, independent bank, First Volunteer Bank. Others in the area locally based include Dunlap, Tennessee-based Citizens Tri-County Bank, Ooltewah-based Community Trust and Banking Co., Dayton, Tennessee-based Community National Bank, Fort Oglethorpe, Georgia-based Capital Bank, LaFayette, Georgia-based Bank of LaFayette, and Cleveland-based Bank of Cleveland.

== Culture and tourism ==
=== Attractions ===
Chattanooga touts many attractions, including the Tennessee Aquarium, caverns, and new waterfront attractions along and across the Tennessee River. In the downtown area is the Chattanooga Choo Choo Hotel, housed in the renovated Terminal Station. Also downtown are the Creative Discovery Museum, a hands-on children's museum dedicated to science, art, and music; an IMAX 3D Theatre, and the newly expanded Hunter Museum of American Art. The Tennessee Riverwalk, an approximately 13-mile-long (21 km) trail running alongside the river, is another attraction for both tourists and residents alike.

Across the river from downtown is the North Shore district, roughly bounded by the Olgiati Bridge to the west and Veterans Bridge to the east. The newly renovated area draws locals and tourists to locally owned independent boutique stores and restaurants, plus attractions along the Chattanooga Riverpark system, including Coolidge Park and Renaissance Park.

The Chattanooga Zoo at Warner Park is at 301 North Holtzclaw Avenue, a short distance from the downtown area. Hours of operation are from 9 a.m. to 5 p.m. every day. In 1937, the first small exhibit was "established with the construction of a 4x6' cage for two Rhesus Monkeys." The Zoo has since grown, as in 2017, "the Zoo kicked off the year with the announcement of the Kits and Cubs Program, which is a unique early childhood learning program designed specifically for the youngest of animal lovers." And in May 2017, "the Zoo broke ground to expand the Corcovado Jungle exhibit adding six new outdoor and six new indoor exhibits to house small South American monkeys and mammals in June."

Parks and natural scenic areas provide other attractions. Ruby Falls on Lookout Mountain at 1720 S. Scenic Highway in Chattanooga is a park with a diverse ecosystem including a large waterfall underground in a cave, a historic castle, scenic overlooks of the Cumberland Plateau and Tennessee River. Craven's House, also on Lookout Mountain, is the oldest surviving structure on Lookout Mountain and was a major focal point during the Civil War. The Cravens House property is part of the Chickamauga & Chattanooga National Military Park. The Lookout Mountain Incline Railway is a steep funicular railway that rises from the St. Elmo Historic District to the top of the mountain, where passengers can visit the National Park Service's Point Park and the Battles for Chattanooga Museum. Formerly known as Confederama, the museum includes a diorama that details the Battle of Chattanooga. From the military park, visitors can enjoy panoramic views of Moccasin Bend and the Chattanooga skyline from the mountain's famous "point" or from vantage points along the well-marked trail system.

Near Chattanooga, the Raccoon Mountain Reservoir, Raccoon Mountain Caverns, and Reflection Riding Arboretum and Botanical Garden boast a number of outdoor and family fun opportunities. Other arboretums include Bonny Oaks Arboretum, Cherokee Arboretum at Audubon Acres, and Cherokee Trail Arboretum. The Ocoee River, host to a number of events at the 1996 Atlanta Olympics, features rafting, kayaking, camping, and hiking. Harrison Bay State Park is another popular destination, offering a range of activities such as fishing, boating, and camping in a scenic lakeside setting. Just outside Chattanooga is the Lake Winnepesaukah amusement park. The Cumberland Trail begins in Signal Mountain, just outside Chattanooga.

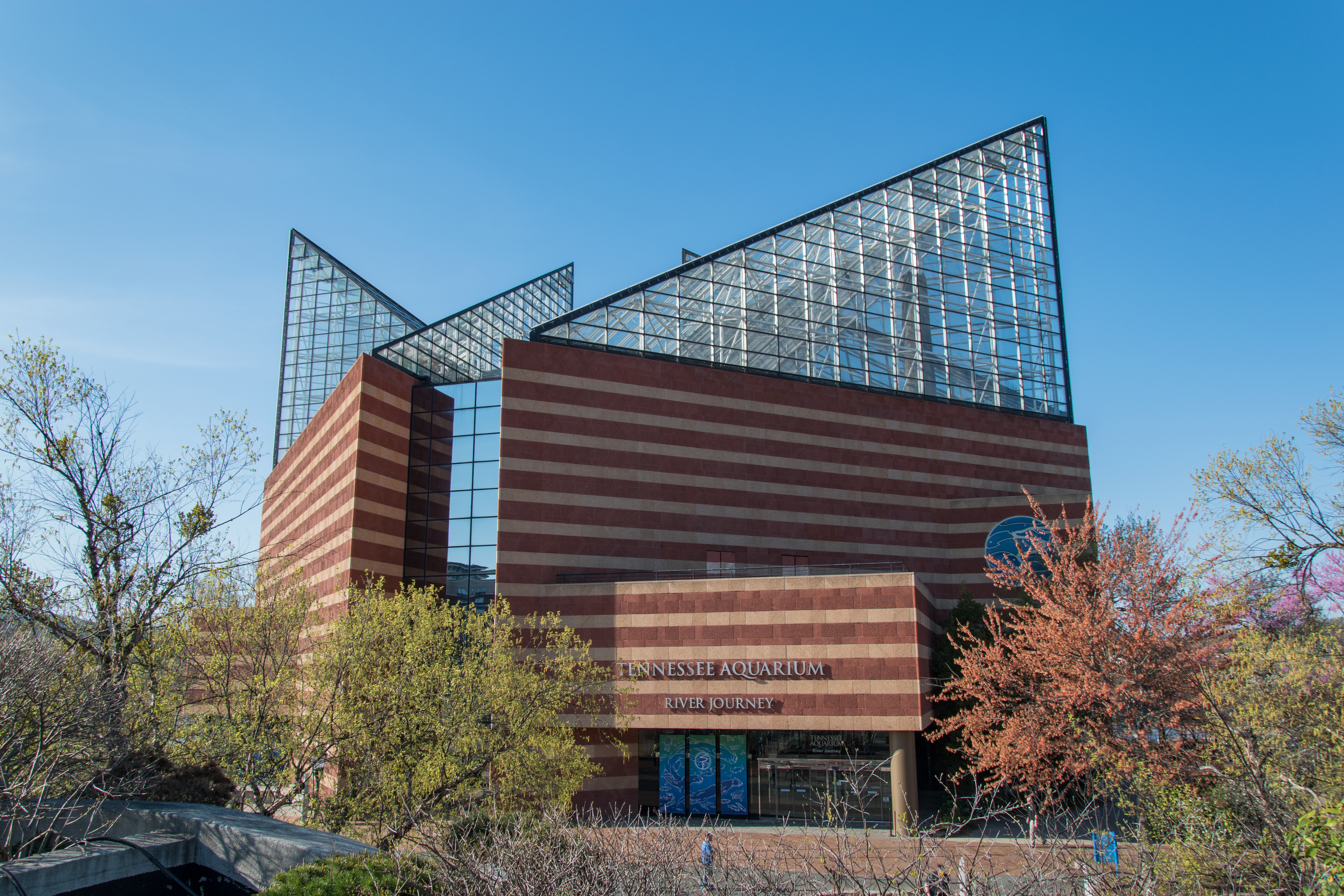
The Tennessee Aquarium's River Journey building

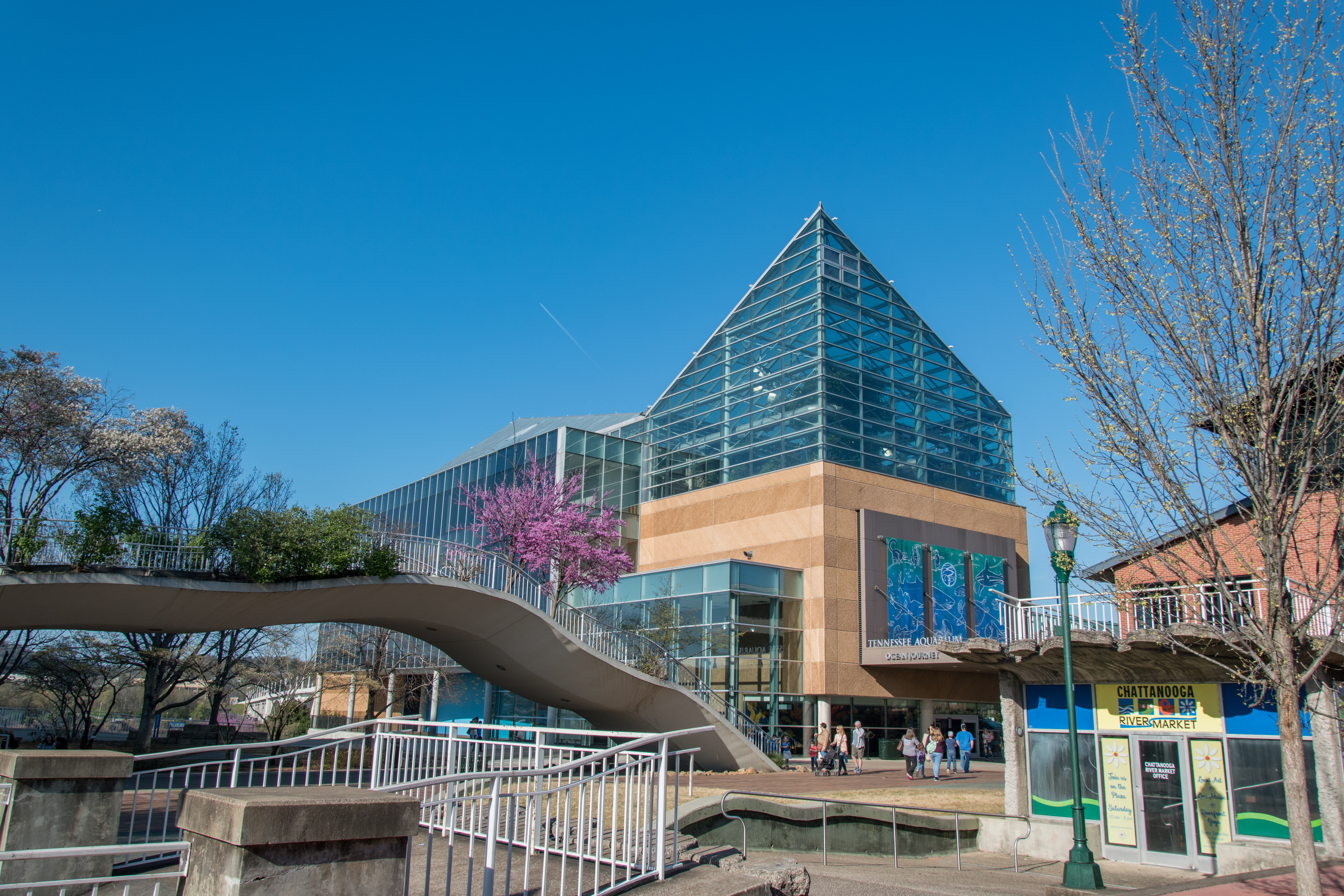
The Tennessee Aquarium's Ocean Journey building

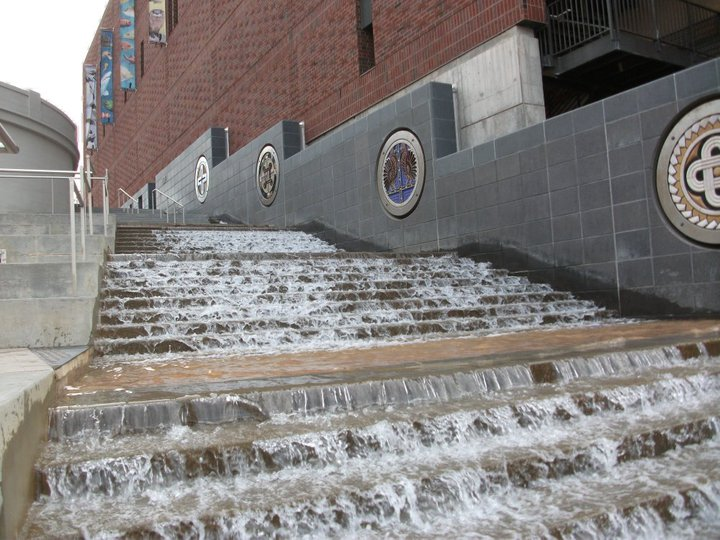
Trail of Tears water steps off of Market Street, downtown Chattanooga

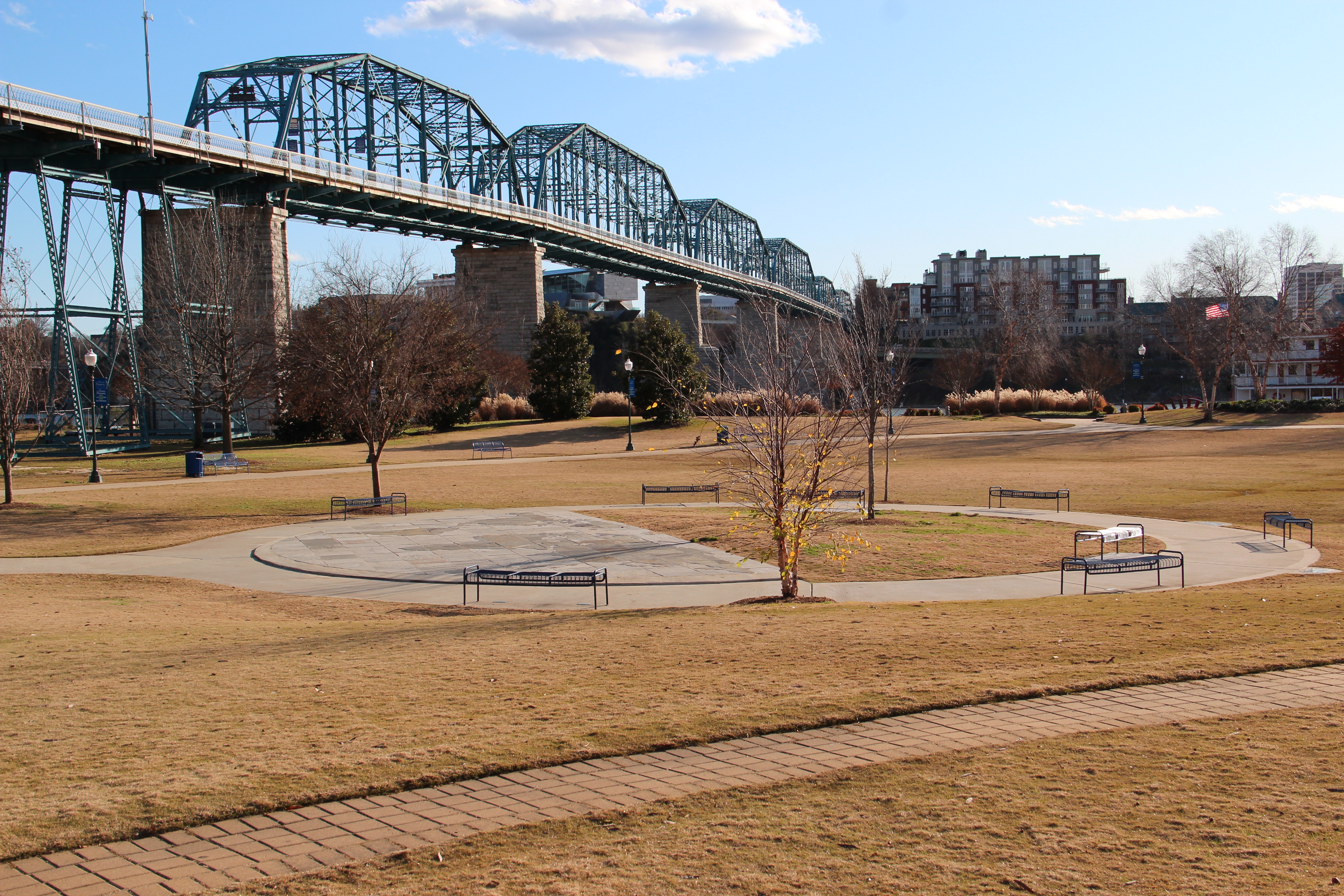
Coolidge Park

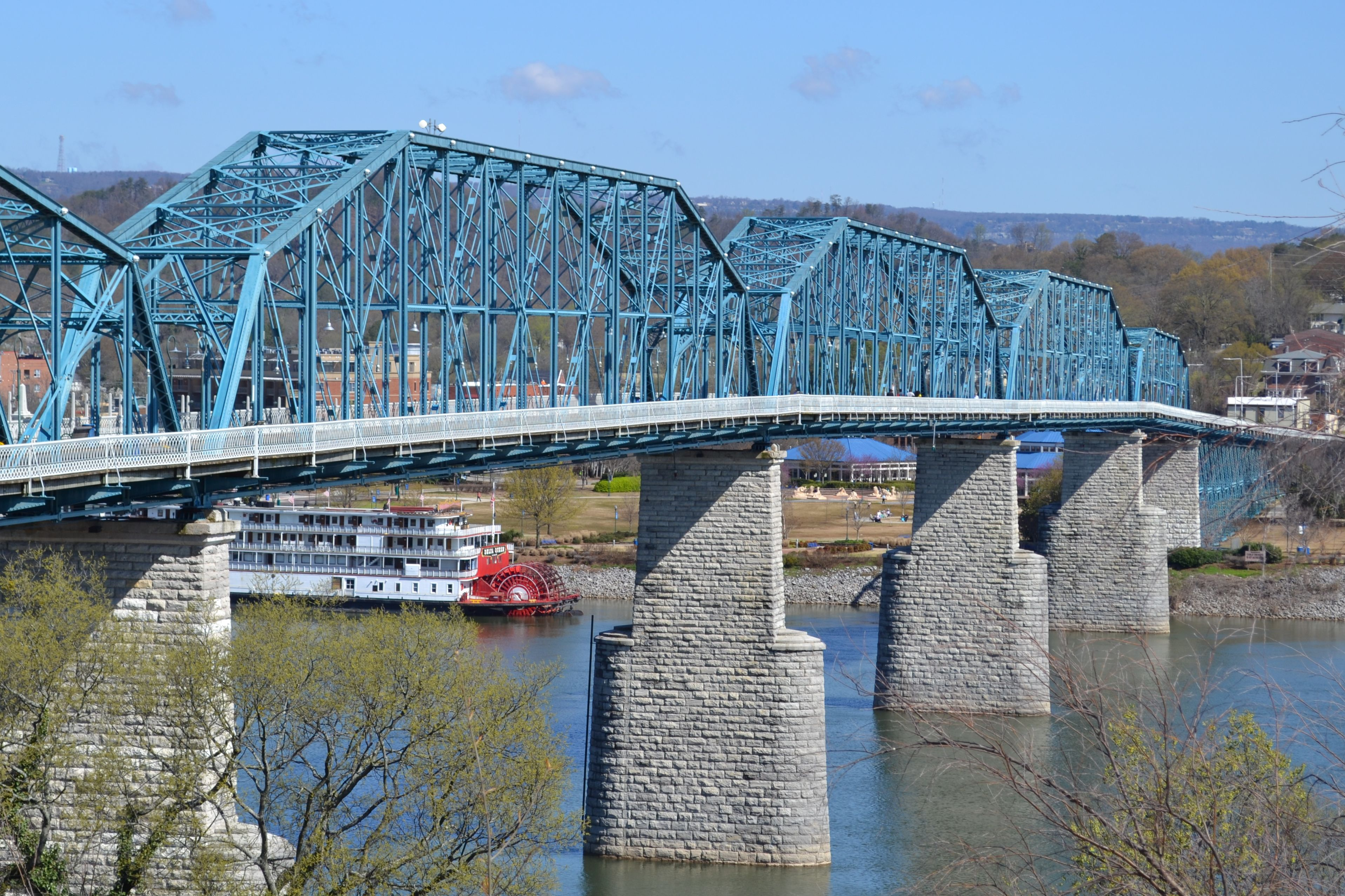
Walnut Street Bridge

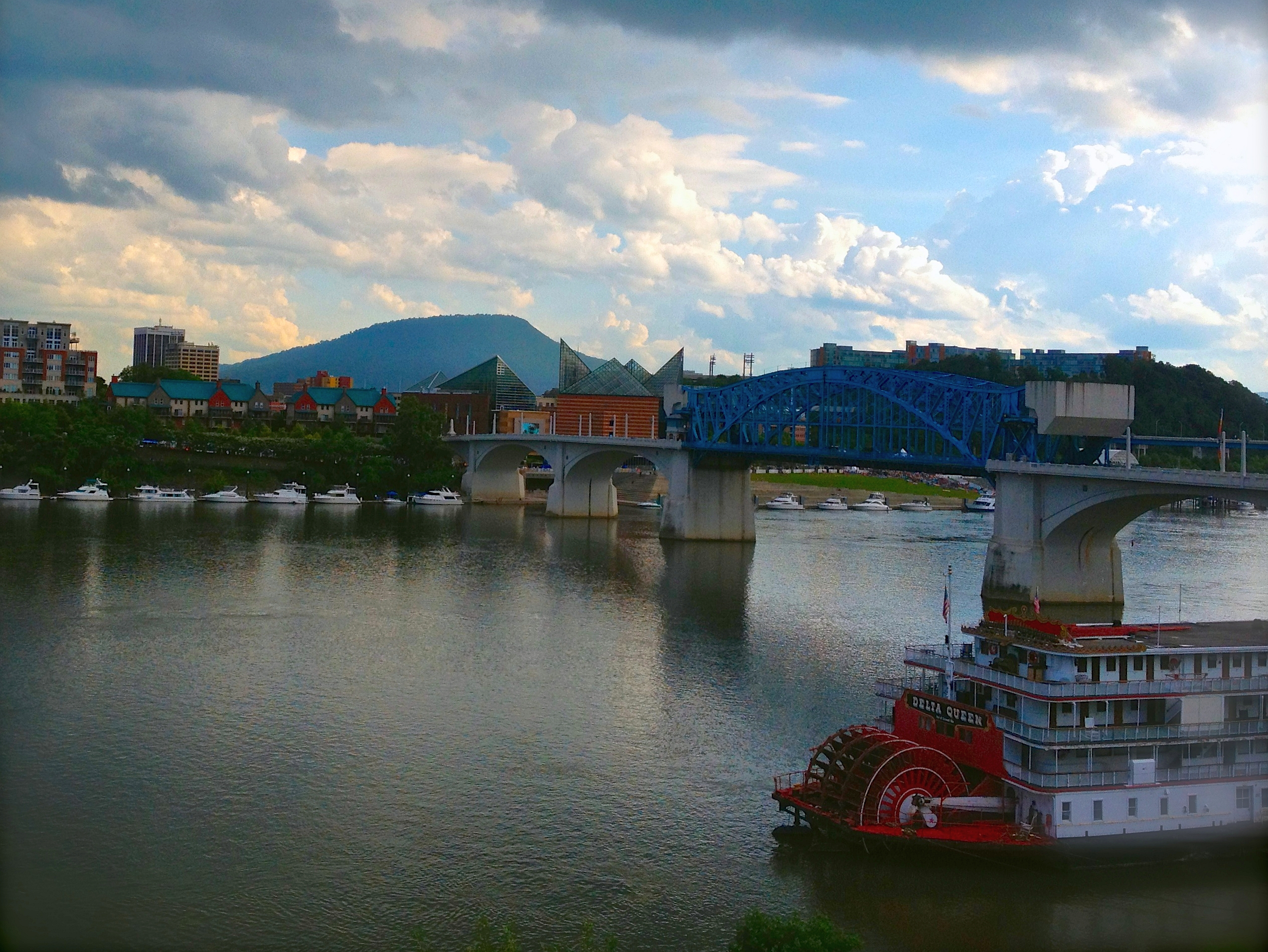
Looking south towards Lookout Mountain

=== Museums ===
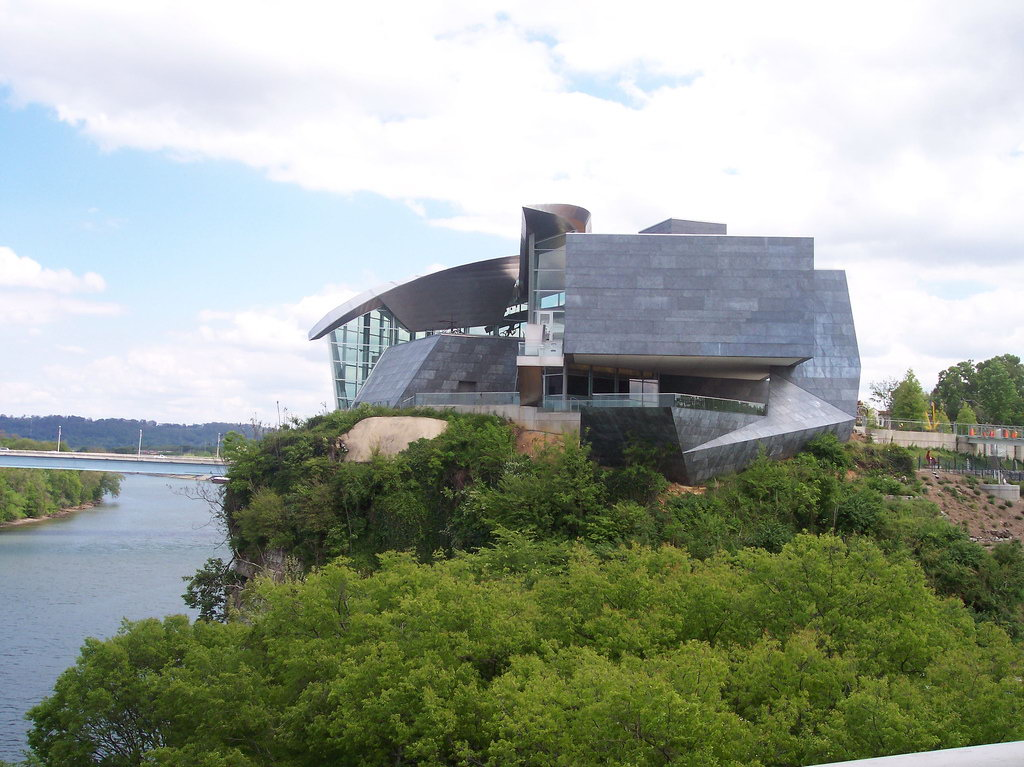
Contemporary extension of the Hunter Museum of American Art

As the birthplace of the tow truck, Chattanooga is the home of the International Towing and Recovery Hall of Fame and Museum. Another transportation icon, the passenger train, can be found at the Tennessee Valley Railroad Museum, called TVRM by locals, which is the largest operating historic railroad in the South.

Other notable museums include the National Medal of Honor Heritage Center, the Houston Museum of Decorative Arts, the Bessie Smith Cultural Center, and the Creative Discovery Museum. Chattanooga African American Museum.

There is no local history museum, but the Chattanooga History website holds a large collection of old photographs and other resources.

There are also several art museums, including the Hunter Museum of American Art. The Institute of Contemporary Arts Chattanooga (ICA Chattanooga), located on campus of the University of Tennessee at Chattanooga (UTC), hosts a series of exhibitions of contemporary art throughout the year, which include exhibitions by regional and national contemporary artists and also feature from UTC's permanent collection.

Starting in late 2025, or early 2026, there will be a brand-new museum called The Motion Museum, which was devoted to everything related to transportation with Firecrown Media, a Chattanooga based company that also bought the portfolio Kalmbach Media, bought the assets from the defunct EnterTRAINment Junction in West Chester, Ohio.

=== Performing arts ===
Chattanooga has a wide range of performing arts in different venues. Chattanooga's historic Tivoli Theatre, dating from 1921 and one of the first public air-conditioned buildings in the United States, is home to the Chattanooga Symphony and Opera (CSO), which became the first merged symphony and opera company in the United States in 1985. The CSO is directed by Kayoko Dan. The Chattanooga Theatre Centre offers 15 productions each year in three separate theater programs: the Mainstage, the Circle Theater, and the Youth Theater.

Another popular performance venue is the Soldiers and Sailors Memorial Auditorium. It was built between 1922 and 1924 by John Parks, General Contractors, and was designed by the architect R.H. Hunt, who also designed the Tivoli Theatre in Chattanooga.

=== National Park City ===
Chattanooga was named the first National Park City in the United States in April 2025 after a two-year vetting process. According to the a press release from the City of Chattanooga, the recognition signifies the city "embraces all aspects of outdoor life, from preserving forests and lakes to being stewards of native plant species and honoring cultural diversity through art, history and play."

=== Literary events ===
Chattanooga hosts several writing conferences, including the Conference on Southern Literature and the Festival of Writers, both sponsored by the Arts & Education Council of Chattanooga.

=== Festivals and events ===
Moon River Festival is a three-day musical festival held every September in Coolidge Park. The festival originally was located in Memphis but relocated to Chattanooga in 2018. Moon River Festival and Riverbend Festival were rated among the top 10 music festivals in the south by Southern Living magazine.

New events, such as GoFest!, the "Between the Bridges" wakeboard competition, Heritage Festival, and Talespin, complement well-established events, such as Riverbend and the Southern Brewer's Festival, and attract their own audiences. Back Row Films is a citywide celebration of film co-sponsored by the Hunter Museum of American Art, the Arts & Education Council, and UTC.

"Nightfall" is a free weekly concert series in Miller Plaza on Friday nights that features an eclectic mix of rock, blues, jazz, reggae, zydeco, funk, bluegrass, and folk music from Memorial Day until the end of September. The Chattanooga Market features events all year round as part of the "Sunday at the Southside", including an Oktoberfest in mid-October.

The Chattanooga Dulcimer Festival, held each June, features workshops for mountain dulcimer, hammered dulcimer, and auto harp, among others, along with performances by champion performers from across the nation.

Chattanooga is also the center of much bluegrass music. In 1935, as well as from 1993 to 1995, the city hosted the National Folk Festival. Since 2007, the annual 3 Sisters Festival showcases traditional and contemporary bluegrass artists, and has been named one of the country's "5 Best" bluegrass festivals by Great American Country.

Each January, Chattanooga plays host to Chattacon, a science fiction and fantasy literary convention. The convention is organized by the nonprofit Chattanooga Speculative Fiction Fans, Inc. First held in 1976, the convention drew an estimated 1,000 attendees to the Chattanooga Choo Choo Hotel in 2012, as well as an estimated 1,300 attendees in 2013.

Since 2014, Chattanooga has been home to the Chattanooga Film Festival, an annual film festival.

== Sports ==
Chattanooga is home to several professional, semi-professional and collegiate sports teams, including the Chattanooga Red Wolves SC (soccer), Chattanooga FC (soccer) and the Chattanooga Lookouts (minor league baseball). The city also hosts annual sporting events such as the Volkswagen USA Cycling Professional Road & Time Trial National Championships, the Ironman Triathlon, and the Head of the Hooch Regatta, which is held on the first weekend of November.

A number of pro wrestling events, as well as other events, such as circuses, concerts, ice shows, monster truck rallies, and rodeos, have been held in Chattanooga since the late 1980s, all at UTC's McKenzie Arena, also known as "The Roundhouse" because of its round shape and the impact of the railroad industry on Chattanooga.

=== Organized sports ===
==== College sports ====
Chattanooga was the home of the NCAA Division I Football Championship game, which was held at Finley Stadium in Chattanooga, from 1997 to 2009.

The University of Tennessee at Chattanooga (UTC) Mocs compete in NCAA Division I and the Southern Conference. UTC's athletic programs include football at the FCS level, women's soccer, volleyball, and cross country in the fall; men's and women's basketball, Wrestling, and indoor track & field in the winter; and softball and outdoor track & field in the spring. Men's and women's golf and men's and women's tennis play in the fall and spring.

==== Minor League Baseball ====
The Chattanooga Lookouts, a Class AA Southern League baseball team affiliated with the Cincinnati Reds, play at Erlanger Park. The franchise traces it lineage back to 1885 with the Chattanooga Lookouts who were charter members on the original Southern League until folding in 1886. Chattanooga has won the Southern League championship three times: first in 1988 as the Double-A affiliate of the Cincinnati Reds and again in 2015 and 2017 as affiliates of the Minnesota Twins.

==== Professional soccer ====
The city has two professional soccer teams that play in different men's leagues. Founded in 2009, Chattanooga FC originally played in the National Premier Soccer League and moved to MLS Next Pro in 2024 as an independent club among reserve teams for Major League Soccer. Chattanooga FC has reached the national finals four times since its inception, and drew a record attendance for amateur competitions—18,227 fans—for their 2015 NPSL title match. The club has also found success in the U.S. Open Cup defeating the professional USL's Wilmington Hammerheads to reach the tournament's third round in 2014 and 2015. In 2019, Chattanooga FC became one of the founding members of NPSL's Founders Cup, a group of eleven teams playing a professional tournament in the fall before forming a fully professional league in 2020. To support this, Chattanooga FC became only the second sports team in the U.S., after the Green Bay Packers, to sell supporter shares in the team. The team won their first MLS Next Pro Cup in 2026 at Finley Stadium.

A second professional team, Chattanooga Red Wolves SC, began play in 2019 as an inaugural member of USL League One in the third tier of American soccer. It was under the direction of Chattanooga FC's former general manager and was accused by the existing club as a ploy to take over the local market. The Red Wolves built their own soccer-specific stadium in East Ridge, Tennessee, which opened in 2020 as CHI Memorial Stadium. The two teams met for the first time in the second round of the 2025 U.S. Open Cup; the Red Wolves won in a penalty shootout after a 1–1 draw at Finley Stadium.

==== Semi-pro football ====
Chattanooga is home to several semi-professional football teams, including the Tennessee Crush and the Chattanooga Steam. The Tennessee Crush plays its games at Finley Stadium in downtown Chattanooga. The Chattanooga Steam plays at Lookout Valley High School near Lookout Mountain.

==== Rugby ====
Chattanooga is also home to several rugby teams: the Chattanooga Rugby Football Club, Nooga Red, Nooga Black, men's Old Boys, a women's rugby team, men's and women's teams at UTC, and an all-city high school team. The Chattanooga Rugby Football Club, which was established in 1978 and the 2011 and 2013 DII Mid South champions, is affiliated with USA Rugby and USA Rugby South. The club fields two teams, Nooga Red, which competes in Division II, and Nooga Black, which competes in Division III. There is also a men's Old Boys team, a Chattanooga women's rugby team, as well as collegiate men's and women's teams representing the Mocs at the University of Tennessee at Chattanooga. A citywide high school rugby team, the Wolfpack, was established in 2012 and is open to any high school player living in the Chattanooga area. All seven teams play their home matches at Montague Park.

Overlooking the grandstand and finish area at the 2008 Head of the Hooch

=== Outdoor sports ===
Rowing

The Head of the Hooch rowing regatta takes place along the Tennessee River in downtown Chattanooga during the first weekend of November. The head race originally took place on the Chattahoochee River in Atlanta before moving to Chattanooga in 2005, hence the name "Head of the Hooch". With 1,965 boats in 2011 and nearly 2,000 boats in 2012, this competition ranks as the 2nd largest regatta in the United States, with numerous college and youth teams, such as UNC Men's Crew, Vanderbilt Rowing Club, James Madison University Crew, University of Tennessee Women's Rowing, Orlando Rowing Club, Nashville Rowing Club, Newport Rowing Club, and Chattanooga Rowing, competing. There are also multiple local rowing clubs, such as the Lookout Rowing Club for adults and the Chattanooga Junior Rowing Club for high school students. The weekend of the Head of the Hooch also sees hot-air balloon rides and other activities.

Cycling

In 2013, the Volkswagen USA Cycling Professional Road & Time Trial National Championships were held in Chattanooga. The schedule for the 3-day event on May 25–27 featured a handcycling time trail and various other cycling time trials and road races, including a men's road race that took the cyclists through the heart of downtown Chattanooga and up Lookout Mountain for a total race distance of 102.5 miles (165.0 km). American professional cyclist Freddie Rodriguez won the national road race championship title for the fourth time in his career. The Championships' debut in Chattanooga marked the first time in the event's 29-year history that women were allowed to compete for professional national titles. Chattanooga will also host the Championships in 2014 and 2015.

The city is home to the Chattanooga Bicycle Club. It was established in 1967 to "encourage and promote bicycle riding and safety, and to foster good relationships between cyclists and motorists by demonstrating courtesy and respect the law." The Chattanooga Bicycle Club advocates for transportation, fitness, and recreation, as well as health and wellness.

This club is in relative with the League of American Bicyclists (LAB), Adventure Cycling, Bike Chattanooga, and Outdoor Chattanooga.

Running

Due to its location at the junction of the Cumberland Plateau and the southern Appalachians, Chattanooga has become a haven for outdoor sports, and has even been named Outside Magazine's "Best Town Ever" twice such as hunting, fishing, trail running, road running, adventure racing, rock climbing, mountain biking, and road biking. The internationally known StumpJump 50k has been hosted on nearby Signal Mountain since 2002.

The Erlanger Half Marathon and Marathon have become a large part of the spring activities in Chattanooga in recent years. These events are orchestrated by the Chattanooga Sports Committee, and the half marathon course and marathon course are designed by the same group of runners. The course is subject to change throughout the years. The most recent marathon and half marathon were held on March 3, 2019.

Triathlons

In August 2013, further cementing Chattanooga's growing status as a nationally recognized outdoor haven, the Chattanooga Sports Committee, an organization established in 1992 to help the city host major sporting events, announced that the Ironman Triathlon would be coming to the city in a 5-year deal. The city became one of only 11 cities in the United States to host the grueling competition showcasing Chattanooga's natural beauty, which consists of a 2.4-mile (3.9 km) swim, a 112-mile (180 km) bike race (which is broken down into two 56-mile (90 km) loops), and a 26.2-mile (42.2 km) run (which is broken down into two 13.1-mile (21.1 km) loops). The event has a $40,000 prize purse and chances to qualify for the Ironman World Championship in Hawaii. On November 4, 2014, it was announced that Chattanooga would host The Ironman 70.3 event, also known as the Half Ironman, in addition to the standard Ironman Triathlon. This event consists of a 1.2-mile (1.9 km) swim, 56-mile (90 km) bike ride, and 13.1-mile (21.1 km) run, and has a prize pot of $30,000. On September 29, 2015, The Chattanooga Convention and Visitors Bureau announced that Ironman had chosen Chattanooga, Tennessee to host the 2017 Ironman 70.3 World Championships.

Awards

Chattanooga has been a member of the League of American Bicyclists' Bronze level since October 2003, the only city in Tennessee to be a member of the organization before Knoxville and Nashville joined in 2010 and 2012, respectively. The city has a number of outdoor clubs: Scenic City Velo, SORBA-Chattanooga, the Wilderness Trail Running Association, and the Chattanooga Track Club. The city also funds Outdoor Chattanooga, an organization focused on promoting outdoor recreation. In September 2004, the city appointed its first-ever executive director of Outdoor Chattanooga to implement the organization's mission, which includes promoting bicycling for transportation, recreation, and active living. For paddlers, Chattanooga offers the Tennessee River Blueway, a 50-mile (80 km) recreational section of the Tennessee River that flows through Chattanooga and the Tennessee River Gorge. Since 2008, Chattanooga has hosted the Skyhoundz World Canine Disc Championship, the crowning event of the largest disc dog competition series in the world.

== Media and communications ==
The city of Chattanooga is served by numerous local, regional, and national media outlets which reach approximately one million people in four states: Tennessee, Georgia, Alabama, and North Carolina.

=== Newspapers ===
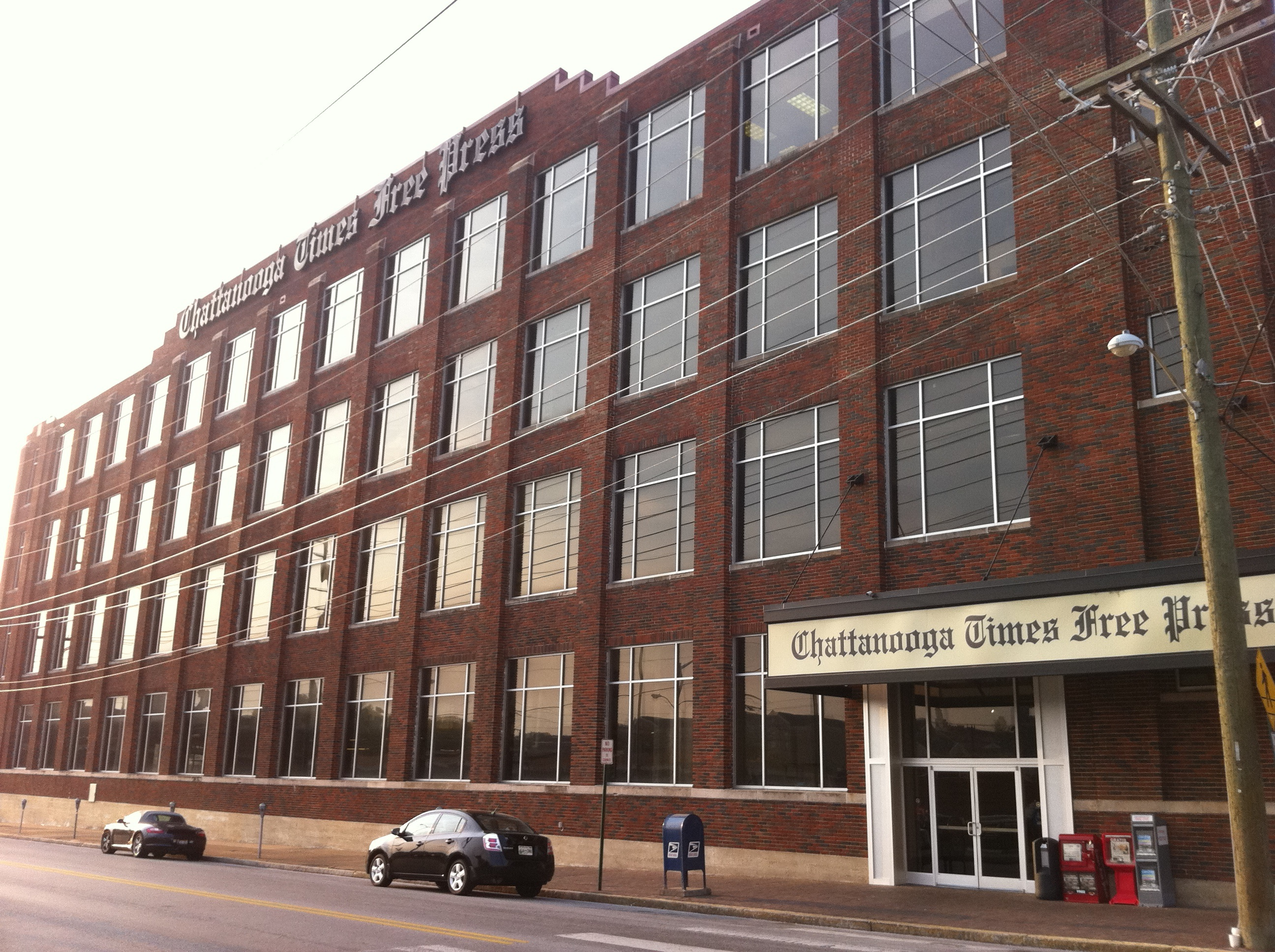
The Chattanooga Times Free Press headquarters

The Chattanooga Times Free Press, the area's only daily newspaper, is published every morning. It was formed in 1999 from the merger of two papers that had been bitter rivals for half a century, the Times and the News-Free Press. The Times was owned and published by Adolph Ochs, who later bought The New York Times. The Times was the morning paper and had a generally more liberal editorial page. The News-Free Press, whose name was the result of an earlier merger, was an afternoon daily and its editorials were more conservative than those in the Times. On August 27, 1966, the News-Free Press became the first newspaper in the nation to dissolve a joint operating agreement. In 1999, the Free Press, which had changed its name from News-Free Press in 1993, was bought by an Arkansas company, WEHCO Media, publisher of the Arkansas Democrat-Gazette, which then bought The Times from the Ochs heirs. The Times Free Press is the only newspaper in the United States to have two editorial pages, reflecting opposite ends of the political spectrum. The Times's editorial page, which is liberal, is on the left page and the Free Press's editorial page, which is conservative, is on the right.

The Chattanooga Pulse is a free weekly alternative newspaper, published every Wednesday, that focuses primarily on arts, music, film and culture. It was formed in 2003 by Zachary Cooper and Michael Kull, running independently until 2008, when the paper was purchased by Brewer Media Group, which also owns and operates five radio stations in the city.

Enigma is a free monthly pop culture and entertainment magazine. Founded as a weekly newspaper in 1995 by David Weinthal, Enigma lays claim to being Chattanooga's oldest alternative newspaper, even though it had ceased physical publication from 2013 until it resumed as a monthly magazine in 2015.

The Chattanooga News Chronicle is an African-American weekly newspaper.

=== Online media ===
The Chattanoogan and its website "Chattanoogan.com", established in 1999, is an online media outlet that concentrates on news from Chattanooga, North Georgia, and Southeast Tennessee. The publisher is John Wilson, previously a staff writer for the Chattanooga Free Press. The Chattanoogan is the oldest online newspaper in Chattanooga.

Nooga.com, purchased in November 2010 by local entrepreneur Barry Large, relaunched in 2011 as a local news website offering "quality daily content focusing on local business, politics, and entertainment in the Chattanooga area." In August 2018, Nooga.com partnered with Greenville, S.C.-based media company 6AM City. The outlet was rebranded and relaunched as NOOGAtoday in September 2018. While NOOGAtoday's primary product is its daily email newsletter, it also publishes content on its social media accounts and website.

=== Radio ===
Chattanooga is served by the following AM and FM radio stations:

==== AM ====
- WDYN 980 AM – Southern Gospel / WDYN Radio, operated by Tennessee Temple University (licensed to Rossville, GA)
- WFLI 1070 AM – Top 40 from the '60s & '70s (licensed to Chattanooga-Lookout Mountain, TN)
- WGOW 1150 AM – News Talk / NewsRadio 1150 (licensed to Chattanooga, TN)
- WNOO 1260 AM – Urban gospel and Motown (licensed to Chattanooga, TN)
- WXCT 1370 AM – AAA / ALT 98.7 (licensed to Chattanooga, TN)
- WLMR 1450 AM – Christian Talk (licensed to Chattanooga, TN)
- WJOC 1490 AM – Southern Gospel (licensed to Chattanooga, TN)

==== FM ====
- WUTC 88.1 FM – NPR/Mixed music / Music 88. Operated by UTC. First station in Chattanooga to broadcast in HD Radio. (licensed to Chattanooga, TN)
- W203AZ 88.5 FM – Religious / CSN International (Licensed to Chattanooga, TN)
- WMBW 88.9 FM – Christian / Moody Radio For The Heart of the Southeast. Owned and operated by Moody Bible Institute. (Licensed to Chattanooga, TN)
- WYBK 89.7 FM – Christian. Operated by Bible Broadcasting Network. (Licensed to Chattanooga, TN)
- W211BG 90.1 FM – Religious (Licensed to Walden, TN)
- WSMC-FM 90.5 FM – Classical/NPR/PRI Operated by Southern Adventist University. (licensed to Collegedale, TN)
- WJBP 91.5 FM – Christian / Family Life Radio (licensed to Red Bank, TN)
- WAWL – College Alternative / The Wawl (web only / formerly broadcasting on 91.5) Chattanooga State Community College (licensed to Chattanooga, TN)
- WDEF-FM 92.3 FM – Adult Contemporary / Sunny 92.3 (licensed to Chattanooga, TN)
- W224AZ (WALV-HD3) 92.7 FM Christian / LF Radio (licensed to Chattanooga, TN)
- WSAA 93.1 FM – Christian Rock / Air 1 (licensed to Benton, TN)
- WMPZ 93.5 FM – Urban Adult Contemporary / Groove 93 (licensed to Harrison, TN)
- WJTT 94.3 FM – Urban contemporary / Power 94 (licensed to Red Bank, TN)
- WAAK-LP 94.7 FM – Variety (low power station licensed to Boynton/Ringgold, GA)
- WALV-FM 95.3 FM – Christian/The Joy FM (licensed to Ooltewah, TN)
- W241AF 96.1 FM / W262DQ 100.3 FM – Conservative Talk / The Big One (licensed to Rossville, GA & Hixson, TN) (simulcast of WFLI-AM)
- WDOD 96.5 FM – Top-40 / Hits 96 (licensed to Chattanooga, TN)
- WUUQ 97.3 FM / W257AZ 99.3 FM – Classic Country / Q Country 97.3/99.3 (licensed to South Pittsburg, TN and Lookout Mountain, TN)
- W249BR (WUSY-HD2) 97.7 FM – Urban Contemporary / Real 97.7 (licensed to Lookout Mountain, TN)
- WLND 98.1 FM – Hot AC / 98.1 The Lake (licensed to Signal Mountain, TN)
- WOOP-LP 99.9 FM – Classic country, old-time gospel, bluegrass, and mountain music. Operated by the Traditional Music Resource Center (licensed to Cleveland, TN)
- WUSY 100.7 FM – Contemporary Country / US101 (licensed to Cleveland, TN)
- WJSQ 101.7 FM – Contemporary and Classic country / 101.7 WLAR (licensed to Athens, TN)
- WOCE 101.9 FM – Spanish (licensed to Ringgold, GA)
- WGOW 102.3 FM – Talk Radio 102.3 (licensed to Soddy-Daisy, TN)
- WBDX 102.7 FM – Contemporary Christian (licensed to Trenton, GA)
- WJLJ 103.1 FM – Contemporary Christian (simulcast with WBDX 102.7) (licensed to Etowah, TN)
- WRXR 103.7 FM – Active Rock / Classic Rock (licensed to Walden, TN)
- WUIE 105.1 FM – American Family Radio (licensed to Lakeside, TN)
- WRXR-FM 105.5 FM – Contemporary Hit / Pop (licensed to Rossville, GA)
- WSKZ 106.5 FM – Classic Rock / KZ106 (licensed to Chattanooga, TN)
- W295BI (WALV HD-2) 106.9 FM Christian/ Joy Worship (licensed to Ooltewah, TN)
- WOGT 107.9 FM – Country / New Country 107.9 (licensed to East Ridge, TN)

=== Television ===
Chattanooga's television stations include:

- WRCB channel 3, NBC affiliate (DT 13 / cable 4)
- WOOT-LD channel 6, Independent/Heartland (formerly UPN)
- WTVC channel 9, ABC/Fox affiliate (DT 9 / cable 10)
- WDEF channel 12, CBS affiliate (DT 8 / cable 13)
- WNGH channel 18, GPB member station (DT 4 / cable 12)
- WELF channel 23, TBN affiliate (DT 28 / cable 9)
- W26BE channel 26, 3ABN affiliate (cable 295)
- WYHB channel 39, Independent/DefyTV (DT 25)
- WTCI channel 45, PBS member station (DT 35 / cable 5)
- WFLI-TV channel 53, The CW/MyNetworkTV affiliate (Formerly UPN and The WB) (DT 23 / cable 6)
- WDSI channel 61, True Crime Network affiliate (DT 14 / cable 11)

== Law and government ==
Flag of Chattanooga from 1923 to 2012

The mayor is Tim Kelly, who was elected in April 2021.

Flag of Chattanooga from 2012

The city operates under a charter granted by the state legislature in 1852; the charter has been subsequently amended.

The city operates under a strong mayor system, which changed from a commission form of government with members voted at-large. In 1987 twelve African American city residents filed a complaint, Brown v. Board of Commissioners of the City of Chattanooga, alleging that the commission-style government violated their civil rights, including the Voting Rights Act of 1965, by diluting the minority black vote. In 1989 U.S. District Judge R. Allan Edgar ruled in their favor, compelling the city to abandon the at-large voting system that it had used for the 'commission' form of government, established single-member geographical districts to proportionally represent both majority and minority elements of the population according to the city's racial demographics, eliminated voting privileges for non-resident property owners, and created the city's mayor-council form of government. The Chattanooga City Council has nine members, of whom four are African American. The strong-mayor system began in 1991 after a 1990 citywide election that used the new court-ordered district system.

The city's legislative branch is represented by members from nine districts, elected from single-member districts in partisan elections. The council members are Chip Henderson (District 1), Jenny Hill (District 2), Jeff Davis (District 3), Cody Harvey (District 4), Dennis Clark (District 5), Jenni Berz (District 6), Raquetta Dotley (District 7), Marvene Noel (District 8), and Ron Elliott (District 9).

Chattanooga's delegation to the Tennessee House of Representatives includes Greg Martin (R), District 26; Michele Reneau (R), District 27; Yusuf Hakeem (D), District 28; Greg Vital(R), District 29; and Esther Helton (R), District 30. In the Tennessee Senate, Chattanooga is divided between Districts 10 and 11 with Todd Gardenhire (R) and Bo Watson (R) representing each district respectively.

Chattanooga is represented in the United States House of Representatives by Chuck Fleischmann (R), who represents the 3rd District. In the United States Senate, both Marsha Blackburn (R) and Bill Hagerty (R) have district offices in Chattanooga.

Chattanooga, as the county seat of Hamilton County, is home to Chattanooga's City Courts and Hamilton County's Courts.

Chattanooga is the location of the United States District Court for the Eastern District of Tennessee's Southern Division, which is housed in the Joel W. Solomon Federal Courthouse. The Southern Division has jurisdiction over Bledsoe, Bradley, Hamilton, Marion, McMinn, Meigs, Polk, Rhea, and Sequatchie Counties.

The Chattanooga Police Department dates from 1852. Starting in 1883, it hired black police officers, making Chattanooga one of the first major Southern cities to have them. But after the state legislature-imposed segregation, black police officers were dropped from the force. They were hired again on a permanent basis beginning on August 11, 1948, years before other major cities in the Southeast, such as Birmingham, Alabama and Jackson, Mississippi, integrated their police departments. The first seven black officers in 1948, Thaddeus Arnold, Singer Askins, W.B. Baulridge, C.E. Black, Morris Glenn, Arthur Heard, and Thomas Patterson, were initially restricted to walking beats in black neighborhoods. In 1960, black police officers were authorized to patrol all neighborhoods and arrest white citizens.

== Education ==
=== Primary and secondary education ===
Most of Chattanooga's primary and secondary education is funded by the government. The public schools in Chattanooga, as well as Hamilton County, have fallen under the purview of the Hamilton County Schools since the 1997 merger of the urban Chattanooga City Schools system and the mostly rural Hamilton County Schools system. The Howard School was the first public school in the area, established in 1865 after the Civil War. Tyner High School (now Tyner Academy) was the first secondary school built east of Missionary Ridge in 1907. It is now the home of Tyner Middle Academy. The Chattanooga School for the Arts and Sciences, the STEM School Of Chattanooga and the Chattanooga High School Center for Creative Arts are additional public magnet schools.

The city is home to several well-known private and parochial secondary schools, including Baylor School, Boyd-Buchanan School, Chattanooga Christian School, Girls Preparatory School, McCallie School, and Notre Dame High School. The Siskin Children's Institute in Chattanooga is a specialized institution in the field of early childhood special education.

=== Higher education ===
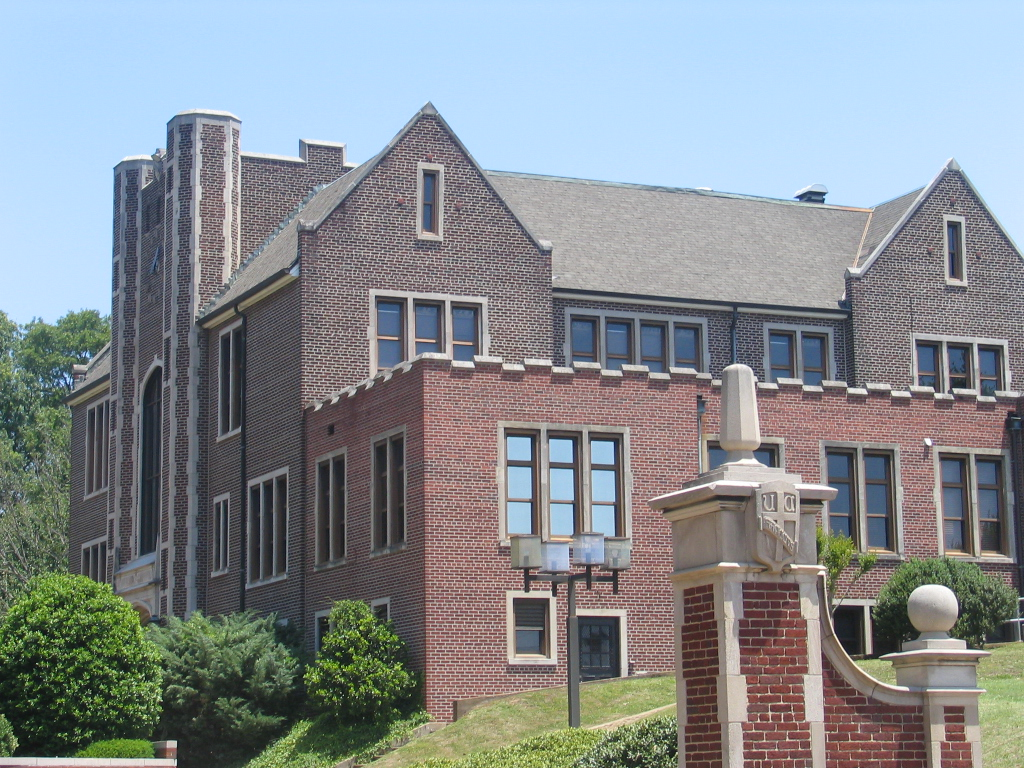
University of Tennessee at Chattanooga's Founders Hall in June 2007

A wide variety of higher education institutions can be found in Chattanooga and nearby. The University of Tennessee at Chattanooga, commonly called UTC, is the second largest campus of the University of Tennessee System, with a student population of over 12,060 as of 2025–'26 school year. Chattanooga State Community College is a two-year community college with a total undergraduate enrollment of roughly 7,623 students in 2024-'25. Chattanooga is also home to a branch of the University of Tennessee College of Medicine, which provides medical education to third- and fourth-year medical students, residents, and other medical professionals in southeast Tennessee through an affiliation with Erlanger Health System. Richmont Graduate University is a Christian graduate school located in Chattanooga with a CACREP accredited clinical mental health counseling program as well as other ministry related degrees and a student population close to 300.

=== Public library ===
The Chattanooga Public Library opened in 1905. Since 1976, the Chattanooga-Hamilton County Bicentennial Library system had been jointly operated by the city and county governments; due to Chattanooga terminating a 1966 agreement with Hamilton County to distribute sales tax revenue equally, the city has taken over full funding responsibilities as of 2011. The city was given a Carnegie library in 1904, and the two-story purpose-built marble structure survives to this day at Eighth Street and Georgia Avenue as commercial office space. In 1939, the library moved to Douglas Street and McCallie Avenue and shared the new building with the John Storrs Fletcher Library of the University of Chattanooga. This building is now called Fletcher Hall and houses classrooms and offices for the university. In 1976, the city library moved to its third and current location at the corner of Tenth and Broad streets.

== Health care ==
Chattanooga has three hospital systems: Erlanger Health System, Parkridge Hospital System, and CHI Memorial Hospital System.

Founded in 1889, Erlanger is the seventh largest public healthcare system in the United States with more than half a million patient visits a year. Erlanger Hospital is a non-profit academic teaching center affiliated with the University of Tennessee's College of Medicine. Erlanger is also the area's primary trauma center, a Level-One Trauma Center for adults, and the only provider of tertiary care for the residents of southeastern Tennessee, north Georgia, northeastern Alabama, and western North Carolina. In 2008, Erlanger was named one of the nation's "100 Top teaching hospitals for cardiovascular care" by Thomson Reuters. Erlanger has been operated by the Chattanooga-Hamilton County Hospital Authority since 1976.

Parkridge Hospital is located east of downtown in the Glenwood district and is run by Tri-Star Healthcare. Tri-Star also operates Parkridge East Medical Center in nearby East Ridge.

Memorial Hospital, which is operated by Denver-based Catholic Health Initiatives, is located downtown. In 2004, Memorial was named one of the "100 Top Teaching Hospitals" by Thomson Reuters.

== Transportation ==
Considered to be the gateway to the Deep South, along with the Midwest and the Northeast for motorists from states such as Alabama, Florida, and Georgia, Chattanooga is ranked as having some of the worst traffic congestion of cities its size, due primarily to unusually high volumes of truck traffic combined with the area's geography. A 2015 study by Cambridge Systematics found that 80% of trucks that pass through Chattanooga are destined for a different location, the highest share of any metropolitan area in the country.

=== Highways ===
Interstate 75 (I-75) connects Chattanooga with Knoxville to the northeast and Atlanta to the south. Interstate 24 (I-24), which to Nashville to the northwest, passes through the central part of the city and reaches its eastern terminus at the 75/24 Split with I-75. The northern terminus of Interstate 59 (I-59) is about 10 miles (16 km) southwest of downtown Chattanooga in Dade County, Georgia, and connects the city to Birmingham to the southwest. A controlled-access segment of U.S. Route 27 (US 27) begins at an interchange with I-24 in downtown Chattanooga, and ends in northern Hamilton County, connecting the city with the cities of Red Bank, Soddy Daisy, Dayton, and Dunlap to the north. State Route 153 (SR 153), some of which is controlled-access, is a major route which connects I-75 to US 27 in the eastern and northern parts of the city. A short controlled-access portion of SR 319, known as DuPont Parkway, connects downtown Chattanooga to the Hixson area.

In addition to US 27, several other US Highways pass through Chattanooga as surface streets, and many share concurrencies. They include U.S. Routes 11, 41, 64, 72, 76, and 127, the last three of which have termini in Chattanooga. US 11 and 64 form a concurrency as Brainerd Road and Lee Highway, and connect Chattanooga to Collegedale and Cleveland to the northeast. US 41/76 (Ringgold Road) connects the city to Ringgold, Georgia, to the southeast, and a surface-street section of US 27 (Rossville Boulevard) connects to Rossville, Fort Oglethorpe, and LaFayette, all in Georgia, to the south. Beginning in downtown and continuing for several miles to the southwest, US Routes 11, 41, 64, and 72 run together as Cummings Highway, before US 11 splits off, heading toward Trenton, Georgia. The remaining three routes continue toward Jasper, where US 72 splits off headed towards Huntsville, Alabama. US 127 (Signal Mountain Boulevard) begins in North Chattanooga at an interchange with US 27, and connects the city to Signal Mountain and Dunlap to the northwest.

Other major state routes in Chattanooga include routes 17, 58 (Highway 58, Ochs Highway), 148 (Lookout Mountain Scenic Highway), 317 (Bonny Oaks Drive), 319 (Hixson Pike), and 320 (East Brainerd Road). Major city-maintained surface streets include Broad Street, Georgia Avenue, Gunbarrel Road, Hickory Valley Road, McCallie Avenue, Shallowford Road, Dayton Boulevard, and Frazier Avenue.

=== Tunnels ===
- Bachman Tubes (also unofficially known as The East Ridge Tunnels), which carry Ringgold Road (US 41/76) into the neighboring city of East Ridge.
- Missionary Ridge Tunnels (also unofficially known as McCallie or Brainerd Tunnels), which carry McCallie and Bailey Avenues (US 11/64) through Missionary Ridge where the route continues as Brainerd Road.
- Stringer's Ridge Tunnel, which carries Cherokee Boulevard through Stringer's Ridge where the route continues as Dayton Boulevard.
- Wilcox Tunnel, which carries Wilcox Boulevard through Missionary Ridge and connects to Shallowford Road.

=== Public transit ===
The city is served by a publicly run bus company, the Chattanooga Area Regional Transportation Authority (CARTA). CARTA operates 17 routes, including a free electric shuttle service in the downtown area, and free wireless Internet on certain "smartbuses".

The Chattanooga Department of Transportation has a mission "to make efficient transportation viable for all commuters – cyclists, pedestrians, transit users, and motorists while enhancing multi-use public spaces for all people." Chattanooga favors public transit, as the opening lines on the TDOT website read: "Sit back, relax, and let someone else deal with the traffic. Compared to driving, public transportation is less expensive, safer, and better for the environment. It reduces traffic congestion, saves energy, and benefits the communities it serves."

=== Bicycle-sharing system ===
The city has its own bicycle transit system (Bike Chattanooga) with 300 bikes and 33 docking stations, all supplied by PBSC Urban Solutions, a Canadian company.

=== Railroad lines ===
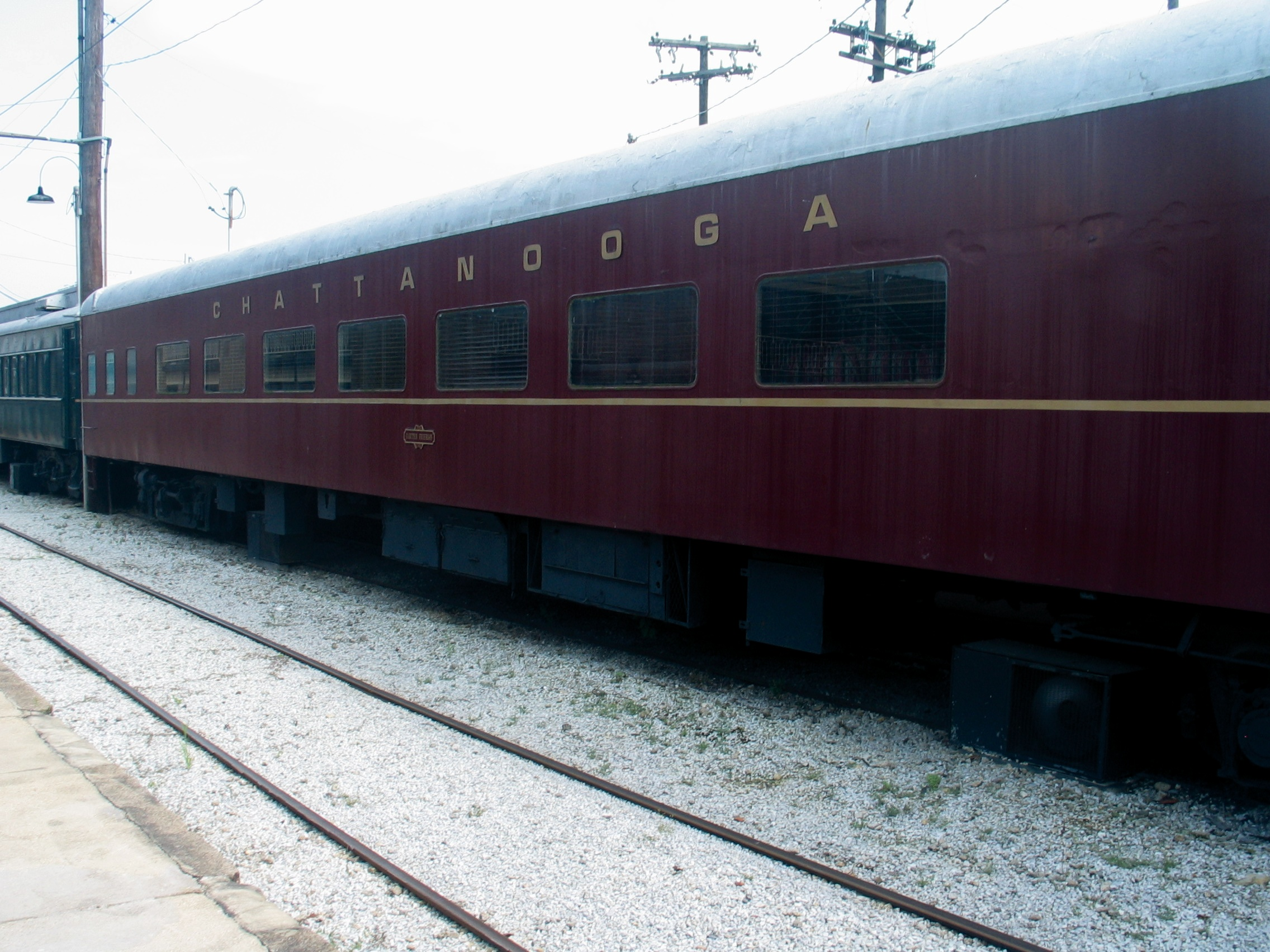
Chattanooga Choo Choo

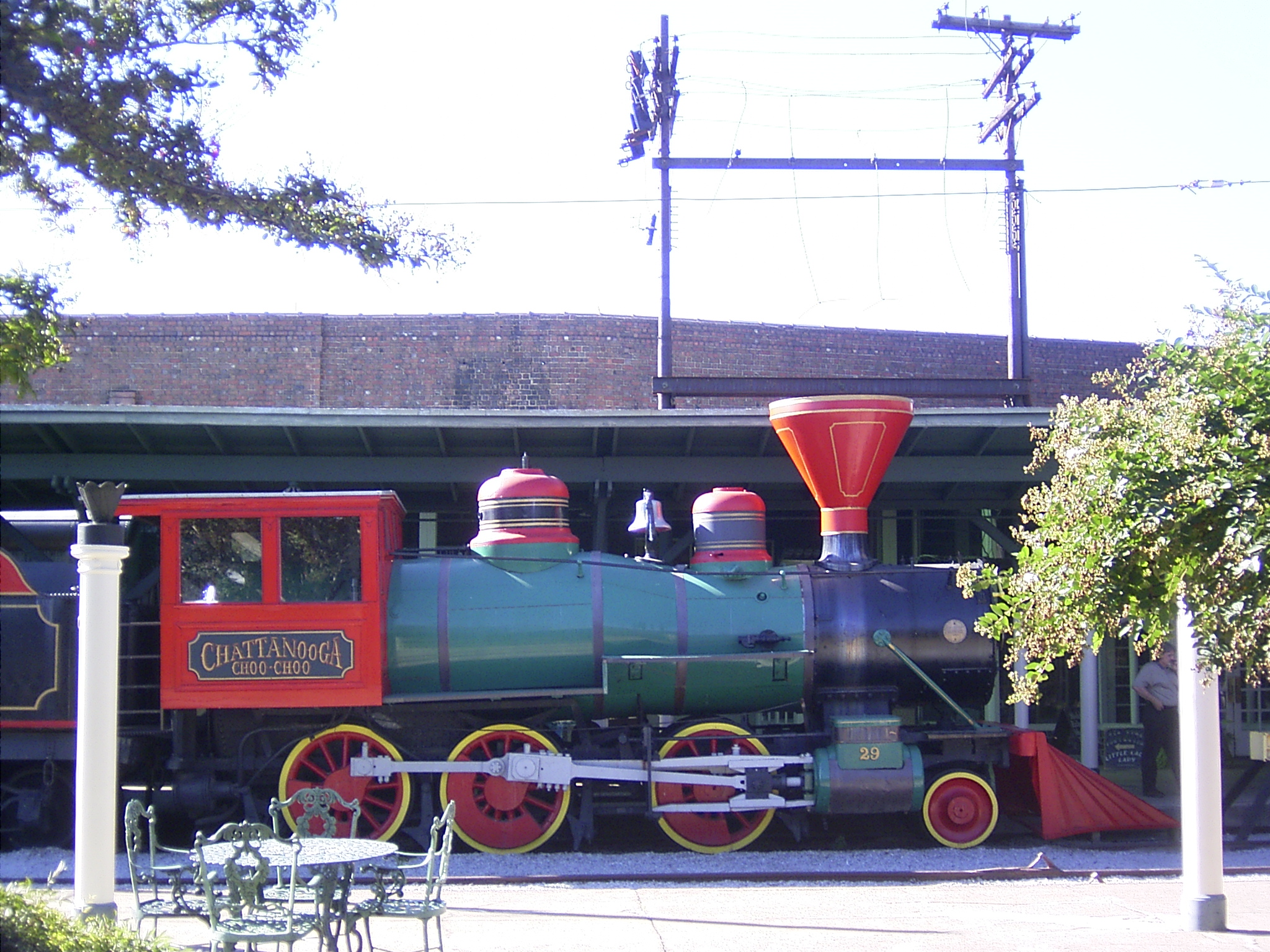
Chattanooga Choo Choo

Though Chattanooga's most famous connection to the railroad industry is "Chattanooga Choo Choo", a 1941 song made famous by Glenn Miller & His Orchestra, the city serves as a major freight hub with Norfolk Southern (NS) and CSX running trains on their own (and each other's) lines. The Norfolk Southern Railway's main classification yard, DeButts Yard, is just east of downtown; Norfolk Southern's Shipp's Yard and CSX's Wauhatchie Yard are southwest of the city. Norfolk Southern maintains a large railroad repair shop in Chattanooga. The two railroad companies are among the largest individual landowners in the city (the Federal Government is another).

The Tennessee Valley Railroad Museum (TVRM), the largest historic operating railroad in the South, and the Chattooga and Chickamauga Railway also provide railroad service in Chattanooga. The headquarters of the National Model Railroad Association (NMRA) were located in Chattanooga next to the TVRM from 1982 to 2013, when the NMRA moved to Soddy-Daisy, a nearby suburb. (The NMRA had moved from Indianapolis, Indiana to Chattanooga.)

Despite the high level of freight rail activity, there is no passenger rail service in the city for commuters or long-distance travelers. But the National Railroad Passenger Corporation (Amtrak) has Chattanooga on a proposed future route that would run from Atlanta to Nashville twice daily, with additional stops in Marietta, GA; Cartersville, GA; Dalton, GA; Bridgeport, AL; Tullahoma, TN; Murfreesboro, TN; and the Nashville International Airport.

Using the AAR reporting marks (NS for Norfolk Southern, CSXT for CSX Transportation, TVRM for the Tennessee Valley Railroad Museum, TNT for subsidiary Tyner Terminal Railroad, and CCKY for Chattooga and Chickamauga Railway), the rail lines passing through Chattanooga are as follows:

- CSXT – Western & Atlantic Subdivision (Chattanooga to Atlanta)
  - Chattanooga Subdivision (Chattanooga to Nashville on former NC&StL trackage)
- NS – Cincinnati, New Orleans and Texas Pacific, aka the Queen and Crescent Route, (Chattanooga to Cincinnati, Ohio via Lexington, Kentucky)
  - Alabama Division (Chattanooga to Memphis via Huntsville, Alabama)
  - Alabama Great Southern (Chattanooga to New Orleans, Louisiana via Birmingham, Alabama)
  - Georgia Division (Chattanooga to Atlanta)
  - Central Division (Chattanooga to Knoxville)
  - Chattanooga Traction Company
    - North Chattanooga to Signal Mountain
    - Dry Valley Line (Red Bank to Lupton City)
- TVRM – East Chattanooga to Grand Junction (3 miles (4.8 km))
  - East Chattanooga Belt Line Railroad (from near 23rd Street, across to Holtzclaw Avenue and East Chattanooga around North Chamberlain Ave., used by TVRM)
  - TNT – Tyner Terminal Railroad (Enterprise South Industrial Park railroad operations)
- CCKY – formerly the Tennessee Alabama & Georgia line (Chattanooga to Hedges, Georgia, abandoned since 2009)
  - formerly the Central of Georgia line (Chattanooga to Lyerly, Georgia)

The Lookout Mountain Incline Railway, often referred to as the Incline Railway by locals, serves as a tourist attraction. It is also occasionally used for commuting by Lookout Mountain residents, particularly during wintry weather when traveling up and down the mountain could be very dangerous.

Until the 1960s the Louisville and Nashville railroad ran passenger trains through Union Station and the Southern Railway ran trains through Terminal Station. The last train, the L&N's Georgian, left Terminal Station in October 1971.

=== Bridges ===
Being bisected by the Tennessee River, Chattanooga has seven bridges that allow people to traverse the river; five of the bridges being automobile bridges, one a rail bridge, and one a pedestrian bridge. These are the following, from west to east:

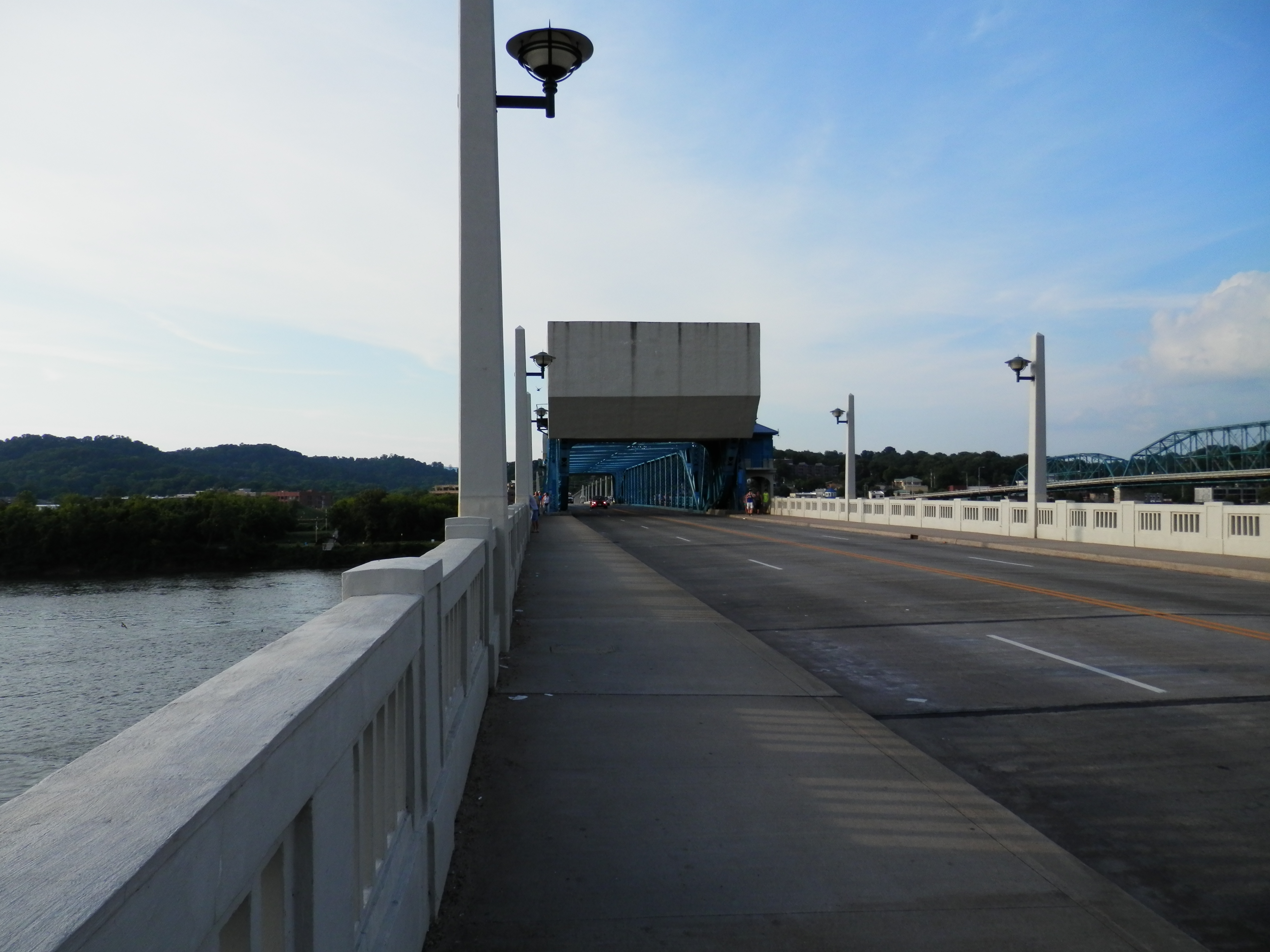
Market Street Bridge facing the North Shore

- P.R. Olgiati Bridge – Named for a former mayor, P.R. Olgiati, this bridge, which was dedicated in 1959, carries U.S. Highway 27 from downtown towards Dayton, Tennessee and points northward.
- Market Street Bridge – Officially called the John Ross Bridge, this bridge is a bascule bridge, which is a type of draw bridge. The bridge was completed in 1917 for the large sum of $1 million for the time. Having stood for decades since its last major overhaul, the Tennessee Department of Transportation declared it unsafe in late 2004. The bridge was closed in 2005 for a long-overdue renovation and was reopened on August 4, 2007.
- Walnut Street Bridge – Also known as "The Walking Bridge", it is one of the centerpieces of Chattanooga's urban renewal and is the second longest pedestrian bridge in the nation. Constructed in 1891, the bridge was declared unsafe and closed to traffic in 1978. It was on the verge of being demolished in the late 1980s when public outcry led to it being restored as a pedestrian-only span that opened in 1993. On March 17, 2025 the bridge closed for an 18 month renovation projected to be completed in September, 2026.
- Veterans Memorial Bridge – Completed in 1984, this bridge has helped commuters from Hixson, Lupton City, and other northern areas reach downtown quickly.
- C.B. Robinson Bridge – Opened in 1981, this bridge carries DuPont Parkway (SR 319) from Amnicola Highway (SR 58) to Hixson Pike and Route 153.
- Tenbridge – This truss bridge with a vertical lift carries the Cincinnati, New Orleans and Texas Pacific Railway over the river and is a popular railfan area. It was constructed in 1920.
- Wilkes T. Thrasher Bridge – Completed in 1955, this route carries Highway 153 over the Chickamauga Dam.

=== Air travel ===
The Chattanooga Metropolitan Airport (CHA) offers non-stop service to various domestic destinations via regional and national airlines, including Allegiant Airlines, American Eagle, Delta Air Lines and its regional carrier Delta Connection, and United Express. The Civil Air Patrol has a Cessna 182 based at the airport. It is utilized by both TN-192 (Choo Choo Senior Squadron), and TN-187 (Chattanooga Cadet Squadron).

== Sister cities ==
Chattanooga's sister cities are:

- Hamm, North Rhine-Westphalia Germany (1975)
- Wuxi, Jiangsu, China (1982)
- Givatayim, Gush Dan, Israel (1988)
- Nizhny Tagil, Sverdlovsk Oblast, Russia (1996)
- Gangneung, Gangwon-do, South Korea (2003)
- Wolfsburg, Lower Saxony, Germany (2011)
- Tōno, Iwate, Japan (2017)
- Accra, Greater Accra, Ghana (2024)
- Trostyanets, Sumy Oblast, Ukraine (2026)

In January 2007, all of the cities above (with the exceptions of Wolfsburg, Tōno, Accra and Trostyanets) and the former sister cities of Swindon and Ascoli Piceno had a tree native to each locale planted at Coolidge Park's Peace Grove, which was established to replace a 100-year-old Slippery elm tree which was damaged in a lightning storm in August 2006. Wolfsburg and Tōno were added in September 2011 and January 2018, respectively. The Peace Grove has nine trees: a linden tree, which represents Hamm; a Chinese elm, which represents Wuxi; a Mediterranean cedar, which represents Givatayim; a white birch, which represents Nizhny Tagil; a ginkgo tree, which represents Gangneung; an English elm, which represents Swindon; a European hornbeam, which represents Ascoli Piceno; an oak tree, which represents Wolfsburg; and a cherry tree, which represents Tōno.

=== Friendship cities ===
Chattanooga has friendly relations with:

- Swindon, South West England, United Kingdom (2006)
- Ascoli Piceno, Marche, Italy (2006)
- Manfredonia, Apulia, Italy (2014)

== See also ==
- Benwood Foundation
- Chattanooga, Rome and Columbus Railroad
- Lyndhurst Foundation
- The Steele Home Orphanage
- Underground Chattanooga
- USS Chattanooga, 4 ships
- YMCA of Metropolitan Chattanooga
