= List of Tennessee Titans broadcasters =

This is a list of all current broadcasters of content related to the Tennessee Titans, a National Football League franchise based in Nashville, Tennessee, United States.

== Radio ==
The Titans' flagship radio station is Nashville-based, but Gallatin-licensed Fox Sports Radio affiliate WGFX. As of 2025, Taylor Zarzour is the play-by-play announcer. Zarzour took over the role that Mike Keith had held since the team became the Titans in 1999; Keith left the Titans to return to his previous role as the Vol Network's lead broadcaster for the University of Tennessee's football team.

The color commentator role is vacant as of April 15, 2026, following the death of analyst Dave McGinnis, the former Arizona Cardinals head coach and Titans assistant who had been in that role since 2017. Pat Ryan, a former Tennessee quarterback who played for three teams over a dozen years in the NFL, was the Titans' first lead analyst, broadcasting alongside Keith from 1999 until 2005. After Ryan left, former Titans tight end Frank Wycheck took over the position and held it until McGinnis came aboard.

The Titans Radio Network is broadcast on about 70 other stations.

Until 2011, the team had resisted placing any of its game broadcasts on Sirius XM Radio, the only team to do so. However, Titans broadcasts are also available on the Internet-based FieldPass.

== Television ==
=== Locally produced news-magazine programs ===
Titans All Access is the 30-minute program devoted to the Titans providing behind-the-scenes footage of the games, and a preview of their next matchup. It initially airs on weekends during football season on Fox affiliate WZTV, with replays airing on affiliate CW affiliate WZTV-DT2 and MyNetworkTV affiliate WUXP. The program is also broadcast on the internet via the team's YouTube channel.

In addition, WKRN, Nashville's ABC affiliate, airs another locally produced sports show, Titans on 2, which is a weekly show that provides the coach an opportunity to talk about the team's latest match-up and looks forward to the upcoming match-up. The show also features a different Titans player every week.

=== Past television game coverage ===
From 1990 until 1994, and again in 1997, Raycom Sports had broadcast rights to preseason games. WKRN, along with WMC-TV/Memphis, and WVLT-TV/Knoxville, were the three stations that ran those broadcasts in the 1997 preseason.

=== Current game coverage on television ===
All preseason games are broadcast over the Titans Preseason Network, which is a seasonal network with Nashville ABC affiliate WKRN-TV serving as the flagship. WKRN also has local over-the-air broadcast rights to any of the Titans’ appearances on ESPN’s Monday Night Football.

Since the start of the 1998 NFL season, the CBS Television Network is in charge of the AFC road games and most all-AFC games on Sunday afternoons. Anytime the Titans play host to an NFC team at Nissan Stadium, the team's home venue, the game(s) are aired on Fox.

In the event of a Sunday night game assigned to the Titans regular season schedule, NBC provides nationwide coverage for the NBC Sunday Night Football games, including WSMV, which also has over-the-air simulcasting duties for any Titans game broadcast exclusively on NFL Network, including that network's Saturday game specials in the latter few weeks of the season.

Starting in 2014, CBS began simulcasting the NFL Network’s Thursday Night Football games for weeks 2-9 of the regular season. Therefore, if the Titans appear in any Thursday Night Football games within those eight weeks of the season, the game will not only be on the NFL Network, but it will also be seen nationally on CBS, regardless of market area. Until 2014, any of the team’s appearances on TNF not simulcast on CBS are locally simulcast on Fox affiliate WZTV. In 2016, the TNF simulcast deal has extended to include NBC for weeks 11-16, with CBS remaining to simulcast TNF for weeks 2-6. From the 2018 to 2021 NFL seasons, TNF simulcasts are broadcast on Fox for weeks 2-14.

Additionally, in Canada, all of the Titans appearances on Monday Night Football are simulcast nationwide on ESPN’s Canadian sister cable channel, TSN and its French language counterpart, RDS, Réseau des sports. Sometimes, when the Titans are to appear in a late Sunday afternoon game against any NFL team based along the Canadian border (i.e. Seattle Seahawks, Detroit Lions, Buffalo Bills), the CTV Television Network may pick up Canadian broadcast rights to those games on a regional basis. All Canadian NFL broadcasts on CTV and TSN are subject to Simultaneous substitution. In some instances, anytime a Sunday regional coverage game involving the Titans on CBS or Fox that are broadcast on any local affiliates in Seattle, Buffalo, or Detroit, can be viewed anywhere in Canada via cable or Satellite television, as most of Canada’s cable and satellite television providers carry American television signals from those markets.

=== Television affiliates ===
Market	Station	Notes/References
Tennessee
Nashville	WKRN-TV	Preseason games, and local over-the-air simulcast of ESPN regular season games, as well as Wild Card simulcast by ABC
Nashville	WSMV-TV	NBC games and NFL Network-exclusive game OTA simulcast
Nashville	WTVF	CBS games (regional and national)
Nashville	WZTV	Fox games (regional and national)
Chattanooga	WDEF-TV	CBS games
Chattanooga	WRCB-TV	Preseason and NBC games
Chattanooga	WTVC	Wildcast simulcast by ABC (on main channel); Fox games (on DT2)
Jackson	WBBJ-DT3	CBS games (regional and national)
Jackson	WJKT	Preseason and Fox games
Jackson	WNBJ-LD	NBC games
Johnson City	WJHL-TV	Preseason and CBS games (main channel); Wildcard game simulcast by ABC (on DT2)
Knoxville	WATE-TV	Preseason games and ESPN Wildcard game simulcast by ABC
Knoxville	WBIR-TV	NBC games
Knoxville	WVLT-TV	CBS games
Knoxville	WTNZ	Fox games
Memphis	WATN-TV	Wildcard simulcast by ABC
Memphis	WHBQ-TV	Fox games
Memphis	WMC-TV	NBC games
Memphis	WREG-TV	Preseason and CBS games
Kentucky
Bowling Green	WBKO	Wildcard simulcast by ABC
Bowling Green	WBKO-DT2	Fox games
Bowling Green	WNKY	NBC games
Bowling Green	WNKY-DT2	CBS games
Bowling Green	WNKY-DT3	Preseason games
Paducah	WDKA	Preseason games
Paducah	WPSD	NBC games
Other states
Evansville, IN	WEHT	Preseason games; Wildcard simulcast by ABC
Huntsville, AL	WHNT	CBS games
Huntsville, AL	WZDX-TV	Preseason and Fox games
Jonesboro, AR	KAIT-DT2	Preseason and NBC games

== See also ==
- History of the Tennessee Titans
- Tennessee Titans
- Titans Preseason Football
- Titans Radio Network
- National Football League on television
