= Titans Radio Network =

Regional play-by-play radio network

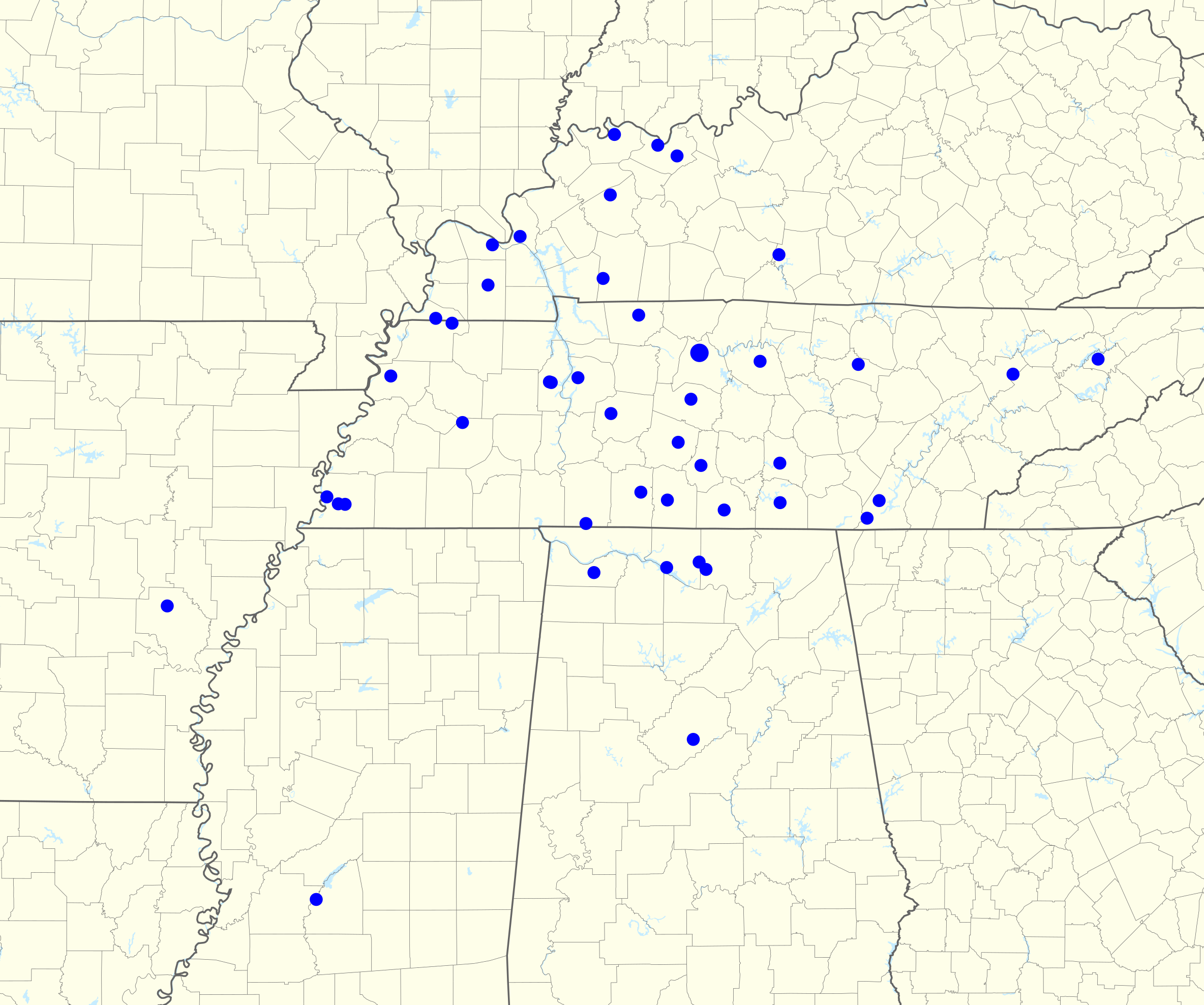
- Map of radio affiliates
- Type: Radio network
- Country: United States
- Headquarters: Nashville, Tennessee
- Broadcast area: Tennessee; Kentucky; Alabama; Arkansas (limited); Illinois (limited); Indiana (limited); Missouri (limited); Georgia (limited); Mississippi (limited); Virginia (limited)
- Owner: Tennessee Titans
- Parent: KSA Industries
- Established: 1960
- Affiliation: NFL
- Affiliates: 42 (including 1 flagship)
- Official website: www.titansradio.com

The Titans Radio Network is an American radio network composed of 42 radio stations which carry English-language coverage of the Tennessee Titans, a professional football team in the National Football League (NFL).

Nashville market station WGFX (104.5 FM) serves as the network's flagship station. The network also includes 41 affiliates in the U.S. states of Tennessee, Kentucky and Alabama, along with nearby areas of Mississippi, eastern Arkansas, and far southern Illinois: twenty-two AM stations, sixteen of which supplement their signals with a low-power FM translator; and nineteen full-power FM stations, one of which supplements its signal with a low-power FM translator.

In addition to traditional over-the-air AM and FM broadcasts, network programming airs on satellite radio via SiriusXM and is available online via Sirius XM, TuneIn and NFL+.

== History ==
=== As the Houston Oilers Radio Network (1960–1996) ===
The radio network began with the 1960 American Football League season as the Houston Oilers Radio Network, when the now-Tennessee Titans were based in Houston, Texas, and were known as the Oilers. Houston's KXYZ was the first flagship of the network for 1960 through 1963. KILT was the network's second flagship station from 1963 to 1975. In the beginning, Majestic Advertising of Milwaukee, Wisconsin was the holder of production rights to the radio broadcasts and pre-season TV broadcasts. In the 1970s and beyond, the network was operated by the Texas State Networks, which also produces their own radio news programs, along with agricultural news updates to their affiliated stations statewide.

KODA took over as the flagship station from 1985 through 1990. KTRH, which was the network flagship from 1976 to 1984, returned to be the flagship for the network for the franchise's final five seasons in Houston from 1991 until the end of the 1996 season. Around 35 to 40 (and at one point 86) stations broadcast all pre-season and regular season games each season, along with any playoff appearance the Oilers had during its time in Houston, including their AFC Championship Game appearances in 1978 and 1979. At one point during this time period after the mid 1980s, KQQK served as the flagship for the team's Spanish-language broadcasts in Houston.

During the team's final season in Houston, which was a disastrous turnout for the team in 1996, and in preparation for the team's move to their then-new headquarters in Nashville one year earlier than expected, the Oilers Radio Network was reduced from many affiliates across most of Texas and western Louisiana to only the flagship station in Houston, and a few affiliates in Tennessee, including its future flagship, then-Adult contemporary-formatted WGFX of Nashville (officially licensed to Gallatin). In October 1996, KTRH cut off games in favor of preseason basketball involving the Houston Rockets of the NBA.

=== As the Tennessee Oilers Radio Network and Titans Radio (1997–present) ===
It was renamed the Tennessee Oilers Radio Network in 1997 during the team's first season in Tennessee. The headquarters were now located in Nashville, but their home games were played in the Liberty Bowl in Memphis in 1997 and the Vanderbilt University's Stadium in 1998 and at least until their then-new stadium, the Adelphia Coliseum (now Nissan Stadium) was completed in August 1999. WGFX became the flagship station for the network, and served as flagship from 1997 until the completion of the 2001 season, although WGFX served as an "affiliate" for the 2004 season. Between the team's initial relocation and the start of the 1999 preseason, the radio network was spread to many radio stations across Tennessee, as well as southern and western Kentucky, northern and central Alabama, and portions of three other states. Titans Radio signed up over 50 affiliates in non-metro areas and a few major cities.

In Spring 1999, the radio network's name was changed to the Titans Radio Network to reflect the team's name change. The Titans Radio name was first used in the Titans first pre-season game in August 1999. Country-music formatted station WKDF, now one of WGFX's in-market sister stations, became the new flagship station in 2002. WGFX, which became a sports talk radio station in 2003, returned as the flagship for the Titans Radio Network starting with the 2010 season.

The team had long refused distribution of these radio broadcasts to SiriusXM, because the Titans' contract with Citadel Broadcasting (then-parent of both WKDF and WGFX) predated the arrival of satellite radio. However, in 2011, the Titans extend their agreement with existing radio partners while a provision allowing home games to be broadcast on Sirius XM. The Titans became the last NFL franchise to reach such a deal.

== On-air radio personalities ==
Here is a list of the current personnel of the Titans Radio Network:

- Taylor Zarzour—Play by Play
- Dave McGinnis — Color Analyst
- Will Boling - Sideline Reporter
- Amie Wells — Sideline Reporter
- Lucas Panzica - Gameday Host
- Rhett Bryan – Executive Producer

== Programming outside live game coverage ==
- Titans Tonight With Keith Bullock (Thursdays)
- Mac Talk (Tuesdays)
- Titans Countdown – pre-game show, one hour prior to kickoff

== Station list ==
Network stations as of the 2022 Tennessee Titans season
Callsign	Frequency	Band	City	State	Network status
WGFX	104.5	FM	Nashville	Tennessee	Flagship
WVNN	770	AM	Athens	Alabama	Affiliate
WCBL	1290	AM	Benton	Kentucky	WCBL-FM simulcast
WJOX-FM	94.5	FM	Birmingham	Alabama	Affiliate
WJTW	1480	AM	Bridgeport	Alabama	Affiliate
WXSM	640	AM	Bristol	Tennessee	Affiliate
WKDZ-FM	106.5	FM	Cadiz	Kentucky	Affiliate
WCLE-FM	104.1	FM	Calhoun–Cleveland–Athens	Tennessee	Affiliate
WRJB	95.9	FM	Camden	Tennessee	Affiliate
W259BN	99.7	FM	Camden	Tennessee	WRJB relay
WGOW	1150	AM	Chattanooga	Tennessee	Affiliate
W239CO	95.7	FM	Chattanooga	Tennessee	WJTW relay
WGOW-FM	102.3	FM	Chattanooga	Tennessee	Affiliate
WKFN	540	AM	Clarksville	Tennessee	Affiliate
WAIN	1270	AM	Columbia	Kentucky	Affiliate
W270DI	101.9	FM	Columbia	Kentucky	WAIN relay
WMCP	1280	AM	Columbia	Tennessee	Affiliate
W255DK	98.9	FM	Columbia	Tennessee	WMCP relay
WKXD-FM	106.9	FM	Cookeville	Tennessee	Affiliate
WYTM-FM	105.5	FM	Fayetteville	Tennessee	Affiliate
WQLT-FM	107.3	FM	Florence	Alabama	Affiliate
WHEP	1310	AM	Foley	Alabama	Affiliate
W223AX	92.5	FM	Foley	Alabama	WHEP relay
WAKM	950	AM	Franklin	Tennessee	Affiliate
WCBL-FM	99.1	FM	Grand Rivers	Kentucky	Affiliate
WPTQ	105.3	FM	Glasgow	Kentucky	Affiliate
WIKQ	103.1	FM	Greeneville	Tennessee	Affiliate
WSON	860	AM	Henderson	Kentucky	Affiliate
W300ED	107.9	FM	Henderson	Kentucky	WSON relay
W261BV	100.1	FM	Hopkinsville	Kentucky	WKFN relay
WZDQ	102.3	FM	Humboldt–Jackson	Tennessee	Affiliate
WOKI	98.7	FM	Knoxville	Tennessee	Affiliate
WCOR	1490	AM	Lebanon	Tennessee	Affiliate
WANT	98.9	FM	Lebanon	Tennessee	WCOR simulcast
WJJM-FM	94.3	FM	Lewisburg	Tennessee	Affiliate
WUMP	730	AM	Madison–Huntsville	Alabama	Affiliate
W280BA	103.9	FM	Madison–Huntsville	Alabama	WUMP relay
WMSR	1320	AM	Manchester	Tennessee	Affiliate
W300BL	107.9	FM	Manchester	Tennessee	WMSR relay
WAKI	1230	AM	McMinnville	Tennessee	Affiliate
W221ED	92.1	FM	McMinnville	Tennessee	WAKI relay
WKIM	98.9	FM	Memphis	Tennessee	Affiliate
WCRK	1150	AM	Morristown	Tennessee	Affiliate
W289BQ	105.7	FM	Morristown	Tennessee	WCRK relay
WVJS	1420	AM	Owensboro	Kentucky	Affiliate
W225CL	92.9	FM	Owensboro	Kentucky	WVJS relay
WPAD	1560	AM	Paducah	Kentucky	Affiliate
W258AN	99.5	FM	Paducah	Kentucky	WPAD relay
WWKY-FM	104.9	FM	Princeton	Kentucky	Affiliate
WKSR	1150	AM	Pulaski	Tennessee	Affiliate
W265AQ	100.9	FM	Pulaski	Tennessee	WKSR relay
W299CW	107.7	FM	Pulaski	Tennessee	WKSR relay
WWIC	1050	AM	Scottsboro	Alabama	Affiliate
W243CU	96.5	FM	Sebree	Kentucky	WSON relay
WVNN-FM	92.5	FM	Trinity–Huntsville	Alabama	WVNN simulcast
W294CV	106.7	FM	Tullahoma	Tennessee	WMSR relay
WQAK	105.7	FM	Union City	Tennessee	Affiliate
WQMV	1060	AM	Waverly	Tennessee	Affiliate
W228DG	93.5	FM	Waverly	Tennessee	WQMV relay
WCDT	1340	AM	Winchester	Tennessee	Affiliate

- Blue background indicates FM translator.
- Gray background indicates station is a simulcast of another station.

== See also ==
- WGFX
- Tennessee Titans
- History of the Houston Oilers
- History of the Tennessee Titans
- List of Tennessee Titans broadcasters
- Titans All Access
