= Horse leg =

Horse leg or Horseleg may refer to:

- A leg of the horse, one of the limbs of the horse
- Horseleg Lake, a lake in Minnesota
- Horseleg Mountain, a mountain in Georgia, United States
