= WFLI =

WFLI may refer to:

- WFLI (AM), a radio station (1070 AM) licensed to Lookout Mountain, Tennessee, United States
- WFLI-TV, a television station (channel 23, virtual 53) licensed to Cleveland, Tennessee, United States
