= WGOW =

WGOW may refer to:

- WGOW (AM), a radio station (1150 AM) licensed to Chattanooga, Tennessee, United States
- WGOW-FM, a radio station (102.3 FM) licensed to Soddy-Daisy, Tennessee, United States
