= WROM =

WROM may refer to:

- WROM (AM), a radio station (710 AM) licensed to Rome, Georgia, United States
- WROM-TV, a television station (channel 9) in Rome, Georgia, United States from 1953 to 1959
