= WCCK =

- Calvert City, Kentucky; United States
- Frequency: 95.7 MHz
- Branding: K95.7

Programming
- Format: Classic Country
- Affiliations: Marshall County High School; Lyon County High School; Motor Racing Network - NASCAR Cup Series

Ownership
- Owner: Jim Freeland; (Freeland Broadcasting Co, Inc.)
- Sister stations: WCBL/WCBL-FM

History
- First air date: 1994
- Call sign meaning: Calvert City, Kentucky

Technical information
- Licensing authority: FCC
- Facility ID: 63436
- Class: A
- ERP: 3,500 watts
- HAAT: 104 meters (341 ft)
- Transmitter coordinates: 37°4′21″N 88°15′4″W

Links
- Public license information: Public file; LMS
- Webcast: Listen Live
- Website: www.marshallcountydaily.com

WCCK (95.7 FM, "K95.7") is a classic country–formatted radio station licensed to Calvert City, Kentucky, United States. The station is owned by Jim Freeland along with oldies stations Benton–licensed WCBL (1290 AM) and Grand Rivers–licensed WCBL-FM (99.1 FM).

== Programming ==
WCCK broadcasts a classic country music format to the Paducah, Kentucky, area. In addition to its usual music programming, WCCK was previously an affiliate of the Tennessee Titans football radio network, a distinction now held by sister station WCBL. and the University of Louisville Cardinals athletics network. It currently airs NASCAR Cup Series races via the Motor Racing Network

== History ==
Stice Communications received the original construction permit for a new FM radio station from the Federal Communications Commission on March 5, 1993. The new station was assigned the callsign WCCK by the FCC on May 14, 1993. WCCK received its license to cover from the FCC on January 10, 1994.

In May 2000, Stice Communications, Inc., reached an agreement to sell this station to Freeland Broadcasting. The deal was approved by the FCC on July 11, 2000, and the transaction was consummated on July 31, 2000.

The callsign WCCK was originally assigned to 103.7 at Erie, Pennsylvania, in the late 1960s, until the early 1990s when the call was changed to WMXE.
