= WDSI-TV =

Television station in Chattanooga, Tennessee

- Chattanooga, Tennessee; United States
- Channels: Digital: 14 (UHF); Virtual: 61

Programming
- Affiliations: 61.1: True Crime Network; 61.2: Comet

Ownership
- Owner: New Age Media, LLC; (New Age Media of Tennessee License, LLC)
- Operator: Sinclair Broadcast Group
- Sister stations: WFLI-TV; WTVC

History
- First air date: January 24, 1972
- Former call signs: WRIP-TV (1972–1983)
- Former channel numbers: Analog: 61 (UHF, 1972–2009); Digital: 40 (UHF, 1999–2018)
- Former affiliations: Independent (1972–1986); Fox (1986–2015); UPN (secondary, 2001–2002); This TV (2015–2022)

Technical information
- Licensing authority: FCC
- Facility ID: 71353
- ERP: 120 kW
- HAAT: 306 m (1,004 ft)
- Transmitter coordinates: 35°9′38.7″N 85°19′5.8″W

Links
- Public license information: Public file; LMS

WDSI-TV (channel 61) is a television station in Chattanooga, Tennessee, United States, affiliated with True Crime Network and Comet. The station is owned by New Age Media and operated by Sinclair Broadcast Group alongside ABC/Fox affiliate WTVC (channel 9) and CW affiliate WFLI-TV (channel 53). The three stations share studios on Benton Drive in Chattanooga; WDSI-TV's transmitter is located on Signal Mountain in the town of Walden.

Established in 1972 as independent station WRIP-TV, channel 61 later became WDSI-TV in 1983. The station was a Fox affiliate from 1986 to 2015, when Sinclair purchased the programming assets of New Age Media's Chattanooga stations but did not assume program control of WDSI-TV.

== History ==
=== WRIP-TV ===
The station signed on the air on January 24, 1972, with the call sign WRIP-TV. It aired an analog signal on UHF channel 61, and was sister station to WRIP radio in Rossville, Georgia (AM 980, now WDYN and FM 105.5, now WRXR). Signing on nearly five years after the construction permit was granted in March 1967, it was Tennessee's second independent station, having launched a little over nine months after the state's first independent, WMCV in Nashville, went off the air but only to return in 1976 as WZTV. It is the state's oldest television station in continuous operation to have never had affiliation with any of the big three networks (ABC, CBS, and NBC). The station was owned by Jay Sadow.

Initially, WRIP was positioned as an all-movie station. Therefore, early programming on WRIP included older movies from the 1930s to early 1960s for most of its broadcast day along with some theatrical cartoons and shorts. These selections included Little Rascals, Three Stooges, and Looney Tunes. The station was on-the-air for about twelve hours a day signing on at noon. By the summer the station was on 19 hours a day signing on at 7 a.m.

The station was plagued by financial problems for several reasons. It was a UHF station serving a small market in a very mountainous area. In analog days, UHF stations, especially those on high channel numbers, usually did not get good reception more than about 30 miles (48 km) away in rugged terrain. Also, the station was losing money because it overspent on movie packages. The station was locally owned and its owner did not have the money to spend on any other programming investments. In 1973, WRIP-TV began to shift to a somewhat more traditional independent station schedule of programs but with a low-budget approach.

By 1974, it added low-budget cartoons, low-budget syndicated shows such as wildlife and sporting shows, and locally based religious shows. That year, the station eliminated movies as well as cutting hours on the air, signing on at 3 p.m. and off the air by midnight. In the fall of 1974 it expanded the broadcast day slightly and added a run of the ninety-minute edition of The 700 Club in 1975 and two runs of the two-hour version of the PTL Club. The station then began selling huge blocks of time to mostly churches in the local area cutting back more on low-budget secular shows.

By 1976, the station was running mostly Christian programs about twelve hours a day along with some low-budget secular programs such as children's programs (including The New Zoo Revue, Devlin, and Gigantor), outdoor sporting and hunting shows, The Mike Douglas Show, as well as some low budget instructional shows about four hours a day. The station was basically profitable by selling thirty- and sixty-minute blocks of time most of the day to local religious broadcasters.

By 1978, WRIP was running Christian programs (both local and syndicated) for all except a couple of hours a day. The station produced and scheduled many hours per day of programs from local churches. By 1980, it was running nearly all religious shows (again half local and half syndicated) with an hour or so a day set aside for a couple of secular shows. In fall 1981, it began adding additional secular shows in the 3 to 6 p.m. time slot, bringing back Gigantor and Bullwinkle as well as youth-appeal shows such as Super Friends, Little Rascals, McHale's Navy, Make Room For Daddy, The Brady Bunch, and Leave It to Beaver, among others. Weekends, the station added shows like The Hardy Boys, Those Amazing Animals, America's Top 10, and others. In winter 1982, the station expanded secular programming to the 2 to 8 p.m. weekday timeslots as well as the 11 p.m. to 1 a.m. time slot. Shows added included off network dramas such as Kojak, Star Trek; sitcoms such as I Love Lucy, and The Munsters along with some movies. The station was about half religious and half secular. That summer, the station added a prime time movie and was secular from about 1 p.m. to 1 a.m. That fall, more cartoons such as Scooby-Doo, Bugs Bunny and The Flintstones were added along with some more movies, and by then the station was two-thirds secular and one-third religious. For the first time since the mid-1970s, the station was secular a few hours a day on Sundays as well.

=== WDSI-TV ===
In January 1983, Jay Sadow sold the station to Roy Hess. The station immediately changed its call sign to the current WDSI-TV. It modified its then-hybrid religious/general entertainment format (which was leaning more on entertainment for the first time since about 1975) adding cartoons in the 7 to 9 a.m. time slot. The religious shows remained in the late mornings, but in the early afternoons, more old movies were added along with holdover classic sitcoms. Cartoons, older sitcoms, and drama shows continued in the late afternoons and early evenings. A prime time movie was also added along with some older shows late at night. The station was on-the-air about 20 hours a day by then. Its on-air branding at that time was "Watch What We're Doing Now".

WDSI provided, free of charge, UHF antennas (which customers could obtain at local convenience stores) so viewers could watch the station. At that time, many households in the Chattanooga media market were still not wired for cable. After the overhaul in programming, the station was sold to Donatelli and Klein in 1985. Stronger, more recent sitcoms such as Benson, M*A*S*H, and better movies were added to the schedule and the religious shows were scaled back even more becoming relegated only to Sunday mornings. On October 9, 1986, WDSI became a charter affiliate of Fox beginning with The Late Show Starring Joan Rivers, remaining with the network until October 2015. It was a typical Fox station at that time running a blend of newer cartoons, recent off-network sitcoms, classic cartoons, old sitcoms, old movies, and drama shows. The station was becoming one of the strongest independents in Tennessee, the polar opposite of what it was just five years before.

In 1993, the station was sold to Pegasus Communications. As time went on due to changes in the industry, classic sitcoms and movies were gradually replaced by more modern talk/reality programs and court shows. Cartoons began to leave the schedule from 1999 until 2002 and were replaced by more first run reality programs. WFLI-TV dropped UPN in 2001, at which time it moved to air in late nights on WDSI, doing so until WYHB-LP became the affiliate the next year. In 2002, WDSI began broadcasting a digital signal on UHF channel 40. On September 5, 2006, the station launched Fox's new sister network MyNetworkTV on a new second digital subchannel. It was not until March 2009 that WDSI-DT2 was added to area digital cable systems.

After filing for bankruptcy in 2004, Pegasus sold most of its stations, including WDSI, to investment group CP Media, LLC, on January 4, 2007; with the sale consummated on March 31. CP then formed New Age Media as the parent company for the former Pegasus stations.

=== Move of Fox to WTVC-DT2 ===
Sinclair Broadcast Group purchased the non-license assets of WDSI-TV and WFLI-TV from New Age Media for $1.25 million in September 2015. While New Age would continue to own and program WDSI-TV, Sinclair acquired all of its existing programming and affiliations.

During a transition process that was completed on October 31, 2015, WTVC's second digital subchannel simulcast WDSI. On that date, when Sinclair launched their new network Comet, the Fox schedule and the intellectual unit for WDSI's main signal moved permanently to WTVC-DT2 under the on-air moniker "Fox Chattanooga". The programming on This TV which had been on WTVC-DT2 moved to WDSI's main signal, with Comet launching on WDSI-DT2; the MyNetworkTV subchannel was moved to WFLI-DT2, with the MeTV signal which had been carried on that slot moved to WFLI-DT3. Cable, satellite, and EPB viewers saw no change, as WTVC-DT2 took over the former channel slots for WDSI's main signal.

== News operation ==
During the early 1990s, ABC affiliate WTVC produced Chattanooga's first nightly prime time newscast at 10 p.m. on then-independent station WFLI through a news outsourcing arrangement. After the WFLI newscast was canceled, WTVC established a second 10 p.m. broadcast on WDSI in 1996. The newscast, originating from WDSI-TV's studios, used WDSI's own news anchors alongside WTVC's meteorologists, sports anchors, and news reporters, though channel 61's own news staff totaled just four people.

In 1999, WDSI began producing its newscasts in-house, later adding a 4 p.m. newscast in January 2001 and a 6:30 p.m. broadcast. This ended in 2004, when WDSI reduced its operations and re-established a news outsourcing arrangement with WTVC, citing the small market. This agreement continued until Sinclair purchased WDSI's programming and non-license assets in 2015.

== Technical information ==
=== Subchannels ===
The station's signal is multiplexed:

Subchannels of WDSI-TV
Subchannel	Res.	Short name	Programming
61.1	720p	TCN	True Crime Network
61.2	480i	COMET	Comet

=== Analog-to-digital conversion ===
WDSI-TV shut down its analog signal, over UHF channel 61, on January 19, 2008. The station's digital signal remained on its pre-transition UHF channel 40, using virtual channel 61. WDSI moved to channel 14 on September 1, 2018.
