= WPHC =

WPHC may refer to:

- WPHC-AM, a station licensed to Waverly, Tennessee, United States from 1963 to 1995, predecessor to WQMV
- WPHC-LP, a low-power radio station (107.9 FM) licensed to serve Spring Hill, Florida, United States
- WYDE-FM, a radio station (92.5 FM) licensed to serve Cordova, Alabama, United States, which held the call sign WPHC from 2006 to 2007
