= WMSR =

WMSR may refer to:

- WMSR (AM), a radio station (1320 AM) licensed to Manchester, Tennessee, United States
- WMSR-FM, a radio station (94.9 FM) licensed to Collinwood, Tennessee, United States
- WMSR - Redhawk Radio, a college radio station broadcasting via the internet from Miami University, Ohio
- Western Maryland Scenic Railroad (WMSR), a heritage railroad based in Cumberland, Maryland, United States
