= WCBL =

WCBL could refer to:

- WCBL (AM), a radio station broadcasting at 1290 kHz on the AM band, licensed to serve Benton, Kentucky
- WCBL-FM, a radio station broadcasting at 99.1 MHz on the FM band, licensed to serve Benton, Kentucky
- West Coast Pro Basketball League, a men's professional basketball minor league in the United States
- Western Canadian Baseball League, a collegiate summer baseball league in Canada
