= Nashville Predators Radio Network =

Sports radio network in the United States

- Type: Radio network
- Country: United States
- First air date: 1998
- Availability: Various AM and FM radio stations
- Headquarters: Nashville, Tennessee
- Broadcast area: Middle Tennessee; South-central Kentucky; Paducah, Kentucky; Cairo, Illinois; Jackson County, Alabama
- Owner: Cromwell Group, Inc; Nashville Predators
- Official website: Nashville Predators Online

The Nashville Predators Radio Network is the regional sports radio network providing radio programming related to the National Hockey League's Nashville Predators. Headquartered in Nashville, Tennessee, the network is a joint venture with the NHL franchise and Cromwell Group, Inc.

The network began operations when the Predators first became an NHL expansion team at the beginning of the 1998-99 NHL season.

== Affiliates ==
City of License	Station	Frequency	Notes
Pegram/Nashville, Tennessee	WPRT-FM 102-5 "The Game"	102.5 FM	Flagship station of the Nashville Predators. Also serves the Clarksville area
Chattanooga	WALV-FM	95.3 FM	
Cookeville, Tennessee	WHUB	1400 AM	
Cookeville, Tennessee	W299BY	107.7 FM	FM translator of WHUB
Manchester, Tennessee	WMSR	1320 AM	
Manchester, Tennessee	W300BL	107.9 FM	FM Translator of WMSR
Hopkinsville, Kentucky	WHOP	1230 AM	
Hopkinsville, Kentucky	W230DH	93.9 FM	FM translator of WHOP.
Glasgow, Kentucky	WCDS	1230 AM	
Glasgow, Kentucky	W284DH	104.7 FM	FM translator of WCDS
McMinnville, Tennessee	WAKI	1230 AM	
Bowling Green, Kentucky	WBVR	1340 AM	
Bowling Green, Kentucky	W300DA	107.9 FM	FM Translator of WBVR
Hohenwald, Tennessee	WMLR	1230 AM	
Cairo, Illinois/Paducah, Kentucky	WKRO	1490 AM	
Scottsboro, Alabama	WWIC	1050 AM	

=== Former affiliates ===
City of License	Station	Frequency	Notes
Nashville	WBUZ	102.9 FM	Former flagship station until the end of the 2010–2011 season.
Nashville	WGFX	104.5 FM	Former flagship station until the end of the 2009-2010 season.
Nashville	WWTN	99.7 FM	Former flagship station.
Columbia, Tennessee	WMRB	910 AM	Affiliation discontinued after station changed formats in 2014.
Drakesboro, Kentucky	WNTC	103.9 FM	Ended relationship with the NPRN when it became an FM repeater of WNSR in Brentwood, Tennessee.
Hopkinsville, Kentucky	W237BV	95.3 FM	Formerly an FM translator of WHOP-AM; became an FM translator for WHOP-FM's HD2 subchannel; W230DH was launched as WHOP-AM's translator in February 2023.
