= WBTS =

WBTS may refer to:

- WBTS-CD, a low-power Class A NBC-owned-and-operated television station (channel 32/virtual channel 15) licensed to serve Nashua, New Hampshire, United States
- WYCN-LD, a low-power Telemundo-owned-and-operated television station (channel 36/virtual channel 8) licensed to serve Providence, Rhode Island, United States, which held the call sign WBTS-LD from October 2016 until August 2019
- WAIB-LP, a low-power radio station (88.5 FM) licensed to serve Redwood, New York, United States, which held the call sign WBTS-LP from August 2014 until October 2016
- WSBB-FM, a radio station (95.5 FM) licensed to Doraville, Georgia, United States, which held the call sign WBTS from October 1999 until October 2010
- WJTW, a radio station (1480 AM) licensed to Bridgeport, Alabama, United States, which held the call sign WBTS until November 1998
- Web-based training system or services
- Watch Tower Bible and Tract Society of Pennsylvania, an 1884 corporation of Jehovah's Witnesses
- Watchtower Bible and Tract Society of New York, Inc., a 1909 corporation of Jehovah's Witnesses
