= Microphone RCA 4A =

RCA 1930s microphone

A WADX Microphone Type RCA 4AP used in the 1932 movie The Big Broadcast by Bing Crosby

Microphone RCA 4A, also called the Microphone RCA 4AA, Microphone RCA 4AP, Box camera mic, and Microphone RCA 4A-1 is an early RCA Corporation condenser microphone used in the Golden Age of Radio. The box-style RCA 4A microphone was introduced in 1928. The RCA 4A had a built-in RCA AA4088 three vacuum tube audio amplifier. The AA4088 audio amplifier used three RCA 864 triode tubes, also labeled the UX-864. The "A" was for "Announce". The 4AA microphone came with a desk stand for use by radio announcers. The RCA 4AP came with a floor-mounted mic stand. Broadcast radio stations widely used the RCA 4A in the 1930s. The RCA 4A has a 7-wire cable that connects to the 19-inch rackmount vacuum-tube power supply and the microphone output electrical connector. The microphone has a capacitor condenser unit, RCA model UZ-4083. The output is from a balanced audio transformer. The microphone tube power supply, RCA Type II-A, feeds 180 volts, 90 volts, and 6 volts for the tube filament heaters. A WADX Microphone Type RCA 4AP was used in the closing scenes of the 1932 movie The Big Broadcast, in which Bing Crosby and Stuart Erwin sing the song Please, a 1932 song by Bing Crosby, at a radio station.

== Franklin D. Roosevelt Library ==
NBC - Franklin D. Roosevelt Microphone RCA 4A used in fireside chats

At the Franklin D. Roosevelt Presidential Library and Museum is the NBC Microphone RCA 4A used by Franklin D. Roosevelt during his Fireside chats. The RCA model 4-A-1 condenser microphone is built with cast metal painted black. The mic has a metal screen and is ringed with a copper ring.

== Also see ==
- RCA Type 44
- RCA Type 77-DX microphone
