= WBDX =

Contemporary Christian radio station in Trenton, Georgia, United States

WBDX and WJLJ

WBDX: Trenton, Georgia; WJLJ: Etowah, Tennessee; United States
- Broadcast area: Chattanooga metropolitan area
- Frequencies: WBDX: 102.7 MHz; WJLJ: 103.1 MHz
- Branding: J103

Programming
- Format: Contemporary Christian

Ownership
- Owner: Partners For Christian Media, Inc.

History
- First air date: WBDX: October 31, 1989; WJLJ: December 29, 1986
- Former call signs: WBDX: WBDX (1989–1998); WJLL (1998); WJLJ: WVKS (1986–1989); WDRZ (1989); WDRZ-FM (1989–1999); WLLJ (1999–2015)

Technical information
- Licensing authority: FCC
- Facility ID: WBDX: 54445; WJLJ: 7932
- Class: WBDX: A; WJLJ: C2
- ERP: WBDX: 320 watts; WJLJ: 50,000 watts
- HAAT: WBDX: 419 meters (1,375 ft); WJLJ: 150 meters (490 ft)
- Transmitter coordinates: WBDX: 34°51′48.00″N 85°23′35.00″W; WJLJ: 35°27′24.00″N 84°40′43.00″W

Links
- Public license information: WBDX: Public file; LMS; WJLJ: Public file; LMS
- Webcast: Listen Live
- Website: J103.com

WBDX (102.7 MHz) and WJLJ (103.1 MHz) are non-commercial, listener-supported FM radio stations. They are owned by Partners for Christian Media and they simulcast a Christian Contemporary radio format branded as "J103." WBDX is licensed to Trenton, Georgia, and WJLJ is licensed to Etowah, Tennessee. They serve the Chattanooga metropolitan area and are the Tennessee Valley's only local Contemporary Christian stations.

J103 asks for donations on the air and on its website. The station says it seeks "to encourage Christians, evangelize non-Christians, and minister to our listeners." The studios are on Hickory Valley Road in Chattanooga.

== History of WBDX ==
WBDX signed on the air on October 31, 1989. It was a Top 40/CHR station known as "The New B103, The Outrageous FM!" owned by local car dealer Herb Adcox. The station competed with Chattanooga's Top 40/CHR FM powerhouse 106.5 WSKZ. WBDX's operations were in a glass enclosed studio in the middle of Eastgate Mall.

Throughout its early years, the station was also known as "Magic 103 FM, The All-New WBDX" when it aired an Adult Contemporary format in the early 1990s. In January 1994 the station became "The New Talk 102.7" and took on a locally-driven talk radio format, featuring mostly local personalities, with an afternoon drive time show "Sport Talk". This format lasted until mid-1994 when Talk 102.7 moved to 102.3. In mid-1994, WBDX flipped to a classic rock sound known as "The New Fox 103", which had previously aired on 102.3.

In early 1995, Partners For Christian Media bought WBDX. On March 4, 1995, WBDX started playing Contemporary Christian Music, originally under the name "102.7 The Light." Eventually the name changed to "J103". The original J103 studio was located in a small 10x10 room within Eastgate. In 1998, J103 moved into what was the former home of WJRX (RX 107) which had also played Christian Contemporary music. In October 2015, the station moved near the Hamilton Place Mall, using a building on Hickory Valley Road. This move enabled J103 to begin broadcasting with state-of-the-art digital equipment. On February 4, 1998, the station changed its call sign to WJLL, and on February 5, 1998, it changed back to WBDX. The station was originally affiliated with Salem Communications to provide a large part of its programming. This included music from 7 p.m. – 6 a.m. and Talk and Teaching shows during the day. In 2005, the station dropped all Salem Communications programming and went fully local.

== History of WJLJ ==
The station went on the air as WVKS on December 29, 1986; 39 years ago. On August 4, 1989 the station changed its call sign to WDRZ, and its format to Contemporary Christian Music. The station was known as "SuperPower 103 FM". In mid 1994, management fired the husband and wife station managers Bobby and Debbie Lubell, who now operate J103, and installed a new staff and country music format. The station did not do well and soon flipped to modern rock. This format was also short lived, and in 1997 the station started simulcasting "97 Kicks FM" WUUQ.

On January 20, 1998, the call sign was changed to WLLJ, and then to the current WJLJ on August 13, 2015. WJLJ operates with an effective radiated power (ERP) of 50,000 watts. Its tower is near Athens, enabling the station's signal to reach into the Knoxville area.

In 1997, "97/103 Kicks FM" was a Top 40/CHR station. it was simulcasting on 97.3 FM and 103.1 FM. The station was co-purchased by Partners For Christian Media, with the help of Friendship Broadcasting in late 1997. It began simulcasting WBDX in February 1998.
