= WVOV =

WVOV may refer to:

- WJTW, a radio station (1480 AM) licensed to serve Bridgeport, Alabama, United States, which held the call sign WVOV from 2013 to 2017
- WMPW, a radio station (970 AM) licensed to serve Danville, Virginia, United States, which held the call sign WVOV from 1981 to 2011
- a radio station in Huntsville, alabama
