= WKWN =

- Trenton, Georgia, U.S.; United States
- Broadcast area: Chattanooga, Tennessee; Dade County
- Frequency: 1420 kHz
- Branding: K-WIN 1420 AM

Programming
- Format: Full-service radio
- Affiliations: Fox News Radio; Compass Media Networks; Salem Radio Network; Premiere Networks; Atlanta Braves Radio Network

Ownership
- Owner: Dade County Broadcasting, Inc.
- Sister stations: WFLI (Chattanooga), WJTW

History
- Former call signs: WADX (1981–1995)

Technical information
- Licensing authority: FCC
- Facility ID: 54444
- Class: D
- Power: 2,500 watts day 112 watts night
- Transmitter coordinates: 34°51′43.00″N 85°29′59.00″W
- Translators: 101.3 W267CX (Trenton) (104.3 MHz) W282AY (Chattanooga)

Links
- Public license information: Public file; LMS
- Webcast: Listen Live
- Website: www.discoverdade.com/kwn/

WKWN (1420 AM) is a radio station broadcasting a full-service format. It is licensed to Trenton, Georgia, and is currently owned by Dade County Broadcasting, Inc. WKWN also simulcasts on low-power translator W267CX 101.3, as well as Chattanooga translator W282AY 104.3.

== Programming ==
WKWN features programming from Fox News Radio, Salem Communications and Westwood One including Mike Gallagher, and Todd Starnes. Alongside sister station WFLI, WKWN airs Dick Bartley's Classic Hits, The Wolfman Jack Radio Show, The Rick and Bubba Show, Dick Clark's Rock, Roll & Remember, and American Top 40 The 70's with Casey Kasem.

== FM Translator ==
WKWN has an FM translator, in addition to the main station at 1420 kHz. This FM translator is used to widen the broadcast area and provide better nighttime coverage.

Broadcast translator for WKWN
Call sign	Frequency	City of license	FID	ERP (W)	HAAT	Class	FCC info	Notes
W267CX	101.3 FM	Trenton, Georgia	201253	250	374 m (1,227 ft)	D	LMS	Branded as "101.3 The Wolf"

== History ==
The station went on the air as WADX on April 10, 1981. On November 6, 1995, the station changed its call sign to the current WKWN.
