= WFLI-TV =

Television station in Cleveland, Tennessee

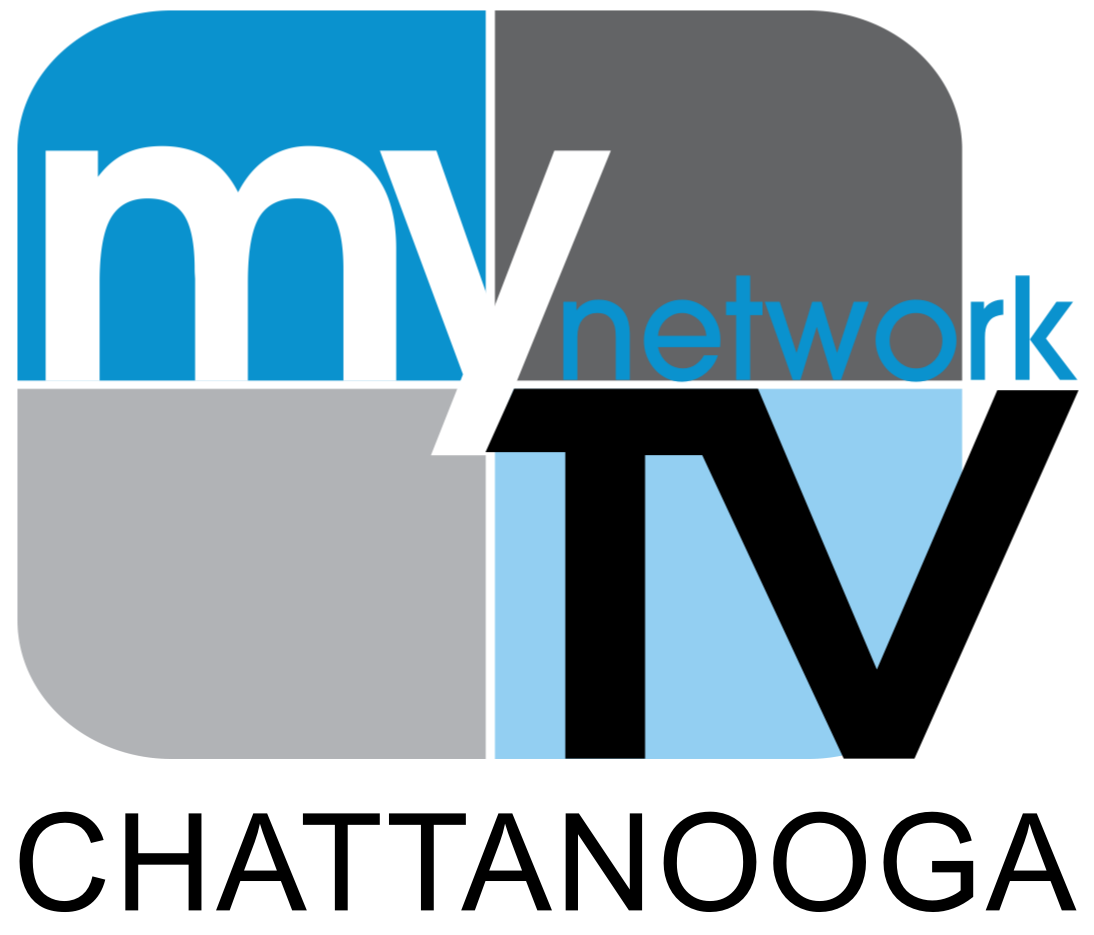
- Cleveland–Chattanooga, Tennessee; United States
- City: Cleveland, Tennessee
- Channels: Digital: 23 (UHF); Virtual: 53
- Branding: The CW Chattanooga; MyNetworkTV Chattanooga (53.2); MeTV Chattanooga (53.3)

Programming
- Affiliations: 53.1: The CW; 53.2: Independent with MyNetworkTV; for others, see § Subchannels

Ownership
- Owner: Sinclair Broadcast Group; (WTVC Licensee, LLC)
- Sister stations: WDSI-TV; WTVC

History
- Founded: November 12, 1985
- First air date: May 25, 1987
- Former channel numbers: Analog: 53 (UHF, 1987–2009); Digital: 42 (UHF, until 2020)
- Former affiliations: Independent (1987–1995); UPN (1995–2001); The WB (secondary 1999–2001, primary 2001–2006)
- Call sign meaning: taken from former sister radio station

Technical information
- Licensing authority: FCC
- Facility ID: 72060
- ERP: 550 kW
- HAAT: 306 m (1,004 ft)
- Transmitter coordinates: 35°9′38.7″N 85°19′5.8″W

Links
- Public license information: Public file; LMS
- Website: chattanoogacw.com

WFLI-TV (channel 53) is a television station licensed to Cleveland, Tennessee, United States, serving the Chattanooga area as an affiliate of The CW and MyNetworkTV. It is owned by Sinclair Broadcast Group alongside dual ABC/Fox affiliate WTVC (channel 9) and co-managed with WDSI-TV (channel 61). The three stations share studios on Benton Drive in Chattanooga; WFLI-TV's transmitter is located on Signal Mountain in the town of Walden.

== History ==
The station signed on May 25, 1987, as an independent co-owned with WFLI radio (1070 AM), hence the television station call sign. It aired on UHF channel 53 from a transmitter in Cohutta, Georgia. On January 16, 1995, WFLI joined UPN as a charter affiliate. In 1997, the station was sold to Lambert Broadcasting, LLC. It added The WB in 1999 as a secondary affiliation; two years later, WFLI dropped UPN and became a full-time WB affiliate. The Meredith Corporation acquired WFLI in 2004.

Between 2001 and 2003, the station sold late-night Saturday paid programming time to an independent producer, out of which eventually arose the format and style of Fuel TV (now Fox Sports 2), which went by that name on WFLI. Fox Cable Networks eventually bought the trademarks and concept of Fuel TV in 2003 to launch it as a full-fledged cable network in July of that year, and the original Fuel TV program on WFLI ended in September 2003.

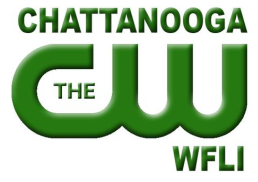
Logo from 2006 to 2016

On March 7, 2006, WFLI was announced as Chattanooga's CW affiliate at the network's launch on September 18 in the wake of the merger of The WB and UPN into The CW. Meanwhile, WDSI-TV launched a new second digital subchannel to serve as the area's MyNetworkTV affiliate beginning September 5. On November 26, 2007, Meredith announced the sale of WFLI to MPS Media which closed April 1, 2008. Shortly thereafter, New Age Media (owner of WDSI) began operation of the station through a local marketing agreement. On May 23, 2011, WFLI signed on a new third digital subchannel of its own to offer MeTV.

Sinclair Broadcast Group purchased the non-license assets of WFLI-TV and WDSI-TV from New Age Media for $1.25 million in September 2015 and began operating them under a master services agreement.

On July 28, 2021, the FCC issued a Forfeiture Order stemming from a lawsuit against MPS Media. The lawsuit, filed by AT&T, alleged that MPS Media failed to negotiate for retransmission consent in good faith for the stations. Owners of other Sinclair-managed stations, such as Deerfield Media, were also named in the lawsuit. MPS was ordered to pay a fine of $512,288.

On November 18, 2025, Sinclair announced that it would acquire full ownership of WFLI, creating a legal duopoly with WTVC. The sale was completed on December 31.

== Technical information ==
=== Subchannels ===
Logo for MeTV subchannel

The station's signal is multiplexed:

Subchannels of WFLI-TV
Subchannel	Res.	Short name	Programming
53.1	720p	CW	The CW
53.2	480i	MyTV	Independent with MyNetworkTV
53.3	480i	MeTV	MeTV
53.4	480i	Charge!	Charge!

=== Analog-to-digital conversion ===
WFLI-TV shut down its analog signal, over UHF channel 53, on June 12, 2009, the official date on which full-power television stations in the United States transitioned from analog to digital broadcasts under federal mandate. The station's digital signal remained on its pre-transition UHF channel 42, using virtual channel 53.
