= Titans All Access =

US television program

- Starring: Taylor Zarzour (2025–present); Mike Keith (2002–2025); Amie Wells; Ruston Webster
- Country of origin: United States
- Original language: English
- No. of seasons: 2

Production
- Running time: 30 minutes
- Production company: Sinclair Broadcasting Group

Original release
- Network: Regional Syndication / WZTV and WUXP-TV (Nashville, TN)
- Release: September 2002 – present

Titans All Access is a magazine-style television program that focuses on the Tennessee Titans, the National Football League franchise based in Nashville, Tennessee. Hosted by Titans Radio Network on-air personality Taylor Zarzour, along with Amie Wells, the show is produced by Fox network affiliate WZTV in association with the franchise. It premiered in September 2002 with Mike Keith as the original host. Episodes are aired during NFL Football season on either Friday, Saturdays, or Sundays, depending on the station.

It will premiere its 24th season at the beginning of the 2026 NFL season.

== Format ==
Long-form behind-the-scenes stories are featured in this program, along with reviews of the previous game, and the previews of upcoming Titans games. Interviews with players, as well as insights from Titans general manager Ruston Webster are also featured.

== Stations ==
In Nashville, Titans All Access is aired on WZTV on Saturdays at 11:30 a.m., and Sundays at 10:30 a.m. MyNetworkTV affiliate WUXP also airs the program at 10:30 a.m. Saturdays. The program is also seen in the Bowling Green, Kentucky market thanks to WZTV's carriage on select cable systems and, more importantly, WZTV and WUXP's over-the-air coverage in that area.

In addition to the broadcast episodes, archived episodes, some from past seasons, can be streamed on the Titans official website and on the team's YouTube channel.

| City of License | Station | Channel | Main affiliation | References/Notes |
|---|---|---|---|---|
| Nashville | WZTV; WZTV-DT2 | 17.1; 17.2 | Fox; The CW | Also serves the Bowling Green, KY market. |
| Nashville | WUXP | 30.1 | MyNetworkTV | Also serves the Bowling Green, KY market. |
| Knoxville | WVLT-TV | 8.1 | CBS | |
| Chattanooga | WDEF-TV | 12.1 | CBS | Also serves northern Georgia and northeast Alabama |
| Memphis | WREG-TV | 3.1 | CBS | Also serves Jackson, TN, northeast Arkansas, and northern Mississippi |
| Jackson, TN | EPlusTV6 | E+ Broadband Cable 6 | Independent | Jackson Energy Authority Cable-only |
| Huntsville, AL | WHNT-TV | 19.1 | CBS | Also serves southern Middle Tennessee |
| Cape Girardeau, MO | KBSI | 23.1 | Fox | Also serves Paducah, KY and southern Illinois |
| Bowling Green, KY | WNKY-DT2 | 40.2 | CBS | Affiliate added in 2022 |

== See also ==
- Tennessee Titans
