= Here Lies Love (song) =

1932 song

Song by Bing Crosby
- Published: 1932 by Famous Music Corp.
- Recorded: October 14, 1932
- Genre: Jazz; American dance music; traditional pop
- Length: 3:07
- Label: Brunswick 6406
- Composer: Ralph Rainger
- Lyricist: Leo Robin

"Here Lies Love" is a song with music by Ralph Rainger and lyrics by Leo Robin, first published in 1932. Introduced by Bing Crosby in the Paramount Pictures film The Big Broadcast (1932), it was released as a B-side to the hit song "Please" and it charted at number 11 for 3 weeks in the US.

Though many contemporary artists have since recorded the song, it is not considered a jazz standard.

== Notable renditions ==
The first commercial recording of "Here Lies Love" was on September 28, 1932, by Sam Coslow with Paramount Studio Orchestra. Since then, numerous jazz artists have recorded the song.

- Bing Crosby (1932)
- Will Osborne (1932)
- Ray Noble (1932)
- Ambrose (1933)
- Dave Brubeck (1954)
- Jackie Gleason (1957)
- Melomani Jazz Group (1957)
- Frankie Laine (1958)
- Sammy Davis Jr. (1965)
- Rod Levitt (1966)
- Terry Waldo (1990)
- Jon Weber (1997)
- Diana Krall (2012)

== Charts ==
Chart (1933)	Peak position
US Billboard	11
