= WROM (AM) =

Coordinates: 34°15′11″N 85°09′19″W

- Rome, Georgia; United States
- Broadcast area: Rome, Georgia
- Frequency: 710 kHz
- Branding: 103.1 Radio M

Programming
- Format: Contemporary Hit Radio

Ownership
- Owner: Howard Toole; (Rome Radio Partners, LLC)

History
- First air date: Dec. 26, 1946
- Call sign meaning: ROMe, Georgia or RadiO M, per branding

Technical information
- Licensing authority: FCC
- Facility ID: 66283
- Class: D
- Power: 1,000 watts (Days Only)
- Translator: 103.1 W276CL (Atlanta Junction)

Links
- Public license information: Public file; LMS
- Webcast: Listen LIve
- Website: 1031radiom.com

WROM (710 kHz "Radio M") is a commercial AM radio station in Rome, Georgia. It airs a Contemporary Hit Radio format blending Top 40, Dance, Alternative and Rock music. The station is owned by Howard Toole, with Rome Radio Partners, LLC, holding the broadcast license.

By day, WROM is powered at 1,000 watts. Because it shares the same frequency as Class A clear channel station WOR in New York City, WROM is a daytimer. To avoid interference, it must go off the air at night, when radio waves travel farther. It is also heard around the clock on 250 watt FM translator W276CL, 103.1 MHz, from Atlanta Junction, a section of Rome.

== History ==
=== AM 710 ===
On December 26, 1946, the station first signed on the air. It was owned by the Coosa Broadcasting Company, with H. Dean Covington serving as president and general manager. The studios were at 121 Broad Street.

In 1999, the LGV Corporarion acquired the station for $150,000. The station carried a Southern Gospel music format.

=== WROM-TV ===
In 1953, immediately after a freeze on new television stations was lifted, H. Dean Covington and associates, the owners of WROM Radio, applied for and received a Federal Communications Commission (FCC) license to construct a TV station on Channel 9 (analog 186-192 MHz). A construction permit was issued for WROM-TV, and the new TV station began broadcasting from the WROM studios at 121 Broad Street in downtown Rome. The station's transmitter was located on Mt. Alto Road, on the highest peak of Horseleg Mountain, west of Rome. WROM-TV Channel 9 was mainly affiliated with ABC, and secured secondary affiliations with NBC, CBS and the DuMont Television Network.

In late 1957, the TV station was sold to Martin Theaters of Georgia, Inc., which had received permission from the FCC to switch its WDAK-TV, Channel 28 in Columbus, Georgia, to Channel 9, necessitating the move of the Channel 9 frequency in Rome farther away to alleviate co-channel interference. Covington and associates owners also agreed to sell their station to Martin Theaters, which then moved Channel 9 from Rome 70 miles north to Chattanooga, Tennessee, and re-license it as WTVC. The station remains affiliated with ABC, now serving the Chattanooga television market.
