= WFLI (AM) =

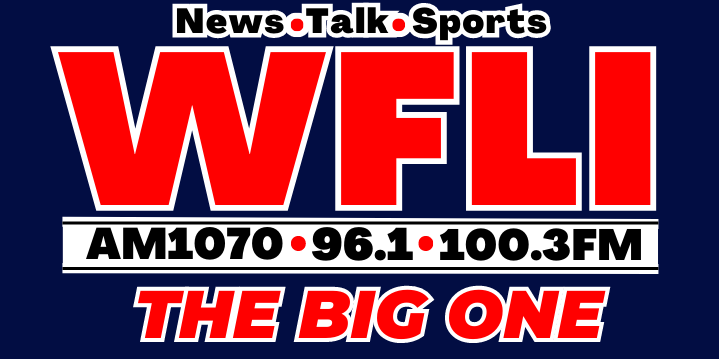
- Lookout Mountain, Tennessee; United States
- Broadcast area: Chattanooga metropolitan area
- Frequency: 1070 kHz
- Branding: The Big One WFLI

Programming
- Format: Conservative talk and Sports
- Affiliations: Fox News Radio; Compass Media Networks; Premiere Networks; Westwood One Sports; Chattanooga Mocs

Ownership
- Owner: Tri-State Radio, Inc.; (Tri-State Radio Inc.)
- Sister stations: WKWN, WJTW

History
- First air date: February 20, 1961

Technical information
- Licensing authority: FCC
- Facility ID: 72061
- Class: B
- Power: 50,000 watts (day); 2,500 watts (night)
- Transmitter coordinates: 35°2′42″N 85°21′44″W
- Translators: 96.1 W241AF (Rossville, GA); 100.3 W262DQ (Hixson)

Links
- Public license information: Public file; LMS
- Webcast: Listen live
- Website: discoverdade.com/wfli

WFLI (1070 AM, "The Big One") is a commercial radio station broadcasting a conservative talk and sports format. Licensed to Lookout Mountain, Tennessee, the station serves the Chattanooga metropolitan area. Owned by Tri-State Radio, Inc., it shares some programming with WKWN in Trenton, Tennessee. WFLI also airs University of Tennessee Chattanooga Mocs football and men's basketball games.

WFLI is also relayed over low-power FM translator W241AF at 96.1 MHz, in addition to a second translator for coverage in areas located north of downtown Chattanooga, W262DQ at 100.3 MHz.

== History ==
=== Top 40 ===
WFLI signed on the air on February 20, 1961. It broadcast with 10,000 watts by day but had to reduce power to 1,000 watts at night. WFLI played Top 40 hits, competing with the other Top 40 AM radio stations in the Chattanooga market such as 1490 WDXB and 1450 WOGA for the young adult market. The station's power was boosted to 50,000 watts in 1967 but it was still limited to 1,000 watts after sunset.

In the 1960s and 70s, WFLI was a popular contemporary hits station in the Chattanooga area. It was nicknamed "Jet Fli". The station also held two concerts each year called "WFLI Jet-Fli Spectaculars". These concerts attracted large crowds to Memorial Auditorium. The WFLI Light in the Sky projected a spotlight in the sky, attracting listeners to businesses and events.

=== Country and Christian radio ===
By 1979, many radio listeners were moving to FM radio for their music, and the new WSKZ (KZ-106) captured a large part of WFLI's audience. After a two-year switch to a country music format, WFLI flipped to a Christian radio format in 1982, branding itself as "The Mid South's Most Powerful AM Gospel Station". It played Southern gospel music with some Christian talk and teaching shows.

WFLI suffered money problems and it went dark on March 31, 2017. It stayed off the air for two months.

=== Talk radio ===
It returned to the air under new management with a talk radio format in May 2017. On July 10, 2017, a one-day-only 1960s–1970s oldies format honored the station's heritage.

It switched back to a talk format by July 11, airing the syndicated talk programs from Laura Ingraham, Dave Ramsey, Todd Starnes, Eric Metaxas and morning duo Rick & Bubba.

WFLI's former "Big Jet FLI" logo from the 2018-2023 era

=== Oldies ===
On April 23, 2018, the station returned to a 1960s and 1970s oldies music format featuring live and local DJs. WFLI also began carrying some special features highlighting the station's past through locally-produced programming such as the "Daily Downbeat" show featuring former station alumni from the station's original 'JET FLI' era of the 1960s and '70s along with other notable or retired broadcasters from other area stations from the same era.

In July 2021, WFLI began to move from 1960s and 70s hits into an updated 70s and 80s classic hits format. It also added several top chart hits from the early to mid-1990s.

=== Return to talk ===
On June 5, 2023, WFLI returned to a conservative talk radio format. It once again carried the syndicated Rick & Bubba show in morning drive time. In middays and afternoons, it aired syndicated conservative talk hosts.

At night and weekends, sports talk programs were added from the CBS Sports Radio Network (now Infinity Sports). WFLI is the flagship station for UTC Chattanooga Mocs athletics, carrying University of Tennessee Chattanooga football and basketball with Learfield Sports.

== Translator ==
Broadcast translators for WFLI
| Call sign | Frequency | City of license | FID | ERP (W) | HAAT | Class | Transmitter coordinates | FCC info |
|---|---|---|---|---|---|---|---|---|
| W241AF | 96.1 FM | Rossville, Georgia | 28329 | 250 | 641 m (2,103 ft) | D | 35°0′35.7″N 85°20′36″W | LMS |
| W262DQ | 100.3 FM | Hixson, Tennessee | 203203 | 99 | 92 m (302 ft) | D | 35°15′20.2″N 85°13′33.8″W | LMS |
