= WTVC =

Television station in Chattanooga, Tennessee

- Chattanooga, Tennessee; United States
- Channels: Digital: 9 (VHF); Virtual: 9
- Branding: NewsChannel 9; Fox Chattanooga (9.2)

Programming
- Affiliations: 9.1: ABC; 9.2: Fox; 9.3: Roar

Ownership
- Owner: Sinclair Broadcast Group; (WTVC Licensee, LLC)
- Sister stations: WDSI-TV; WFLI-TV

History
- First air date: March 13, 1953 (in Rome, Georgia); February 11, 1958 (license moved to Chattanooga)
- Last air date: December 1957 (in Rome, Georgia)
- Former call signs: WROM-TV (1953–1957); WTVC (1957–19??); WTVC-TV (19??–1998)
- Former channel numbers: Analog: 9 (VHF, 1953–2009); Digital: 35 (UHF, 2000–2009)
- Former affiliations: NBC (1953–1956); CBS (secondary, 1953–1954); DuMont (secondary, 1953–1956); Independent (1956–1957); Dark (1957–1958)
- Call sign meaning: Television Chattanooga

Technical information
- Licensing authority: FCC
- Facility ID: 22590
- ERP: 90 kW
- HAAT: 316 m (1,037 ft)
- Transmitter coordinates: 35°9′38.7″N 85°19′5.8″W
- Translator(s): WPDP-CD 33 Cleveland

Links
- Public license information: Public file; LMS
- Website: newschannel9.com; foxchattanooga.com (9.2)

WTVC (channel 9) is a television station in Chattanooga, Tennessee, United States, affiliated with ABC and Fox. It is owned by Sinclair Broadcast Group alongside CW affiliate WFLI-TV (channel 53) and co-managed with WDSI-TV (channel 61). The three stations share studios on Benton Drive in Chattanooga; WTVC's transmitter is located on Signal Mountain in the town of Walden.

In addition to its main digital signal, WTVC can be seen off-air on a low-power, Class A repeater, WPDP-CD (channel 33). Licensed to Cleveland, Tennessee, this station has a transmitter on Oswald Dome in unincorporated Polk County (northeast of Benton) in the Cherokee National Forest.

== History ==
=== As WROM-TV ===
The station signed on the air on June 15, 1953, as WROM-TV, an NBC affiliate licensed to Rome, Georgia, with signal coverage that generally favored Chattanooga. It transmitted an analog signal on VHF channel 9 at 98,000 watts from a tower on Horseleg Mountain west of Rome. WROM-TV also had secondary affiliations with CBS, ABC, and the DuMont Television Network. The station lost CBS when WDEF-TV signed on in 1954. WROM-TV then carried NBC, ABC, and DuMont until 1956 when DuMont went off the air and WRGP-TV (now WRCB) signed on and took the NBC affiliation. At that time, ABC opted to end its affiliate relationship with WROM-TV and secure secondary affiliations with WDEF and WRGP because WROM-TV's signal, now reduced to 31,000 watts visual, only reached the southern suburbs of Chattanooga.

WROM-TV continued as an independent station until late 1957. During its tenure as a Rome station, it claimed to be "Dixie's Largest Independent." The station ran a late-afternoon and prime-time schedule of old movies, "hillbilly" music performances (which were common on Southern TV stations in the 1950s) and occasionally, ABC TV network fare such as Omnibus.

Martin Theaters (forerunner of Carmike Cinemas) bought the station in 1957 and in December of that year, took it off the air to move the transmitter 70 miles (110 km) north to Chattanooga, and prepare it to operate at full power. Martin Theaters had petitioned the FCC for permission to move its also recently purchased WDAK-TV on channel 28 in Columbus, Georgia, to channel 9, but FCC rules mandated a certain amount of separation for stations on the same channel, and channel 9 in Rome provided a strong grade B signal to Columbus. Additionally, the FCC normally did not allow common ownership of two stations with overlapping signals, and found that the overlap between the channel 9 in WROM and the proposed channel 9 in Columbus would have been too great. The move to Chattanooga by WROM-TV would satisfy the co-channel restriction.

The Chattanooga–Columbus channel reallocation was part of the last large scale FCC national analog channel reallocation that saw stations in the Southeast switch frequencies not only in Chattanooga and Columbus, but also in Dothan and Montgomery, Alabama; Greenwood, Tupelo, and Laurel, Mississippi; Florence, South Carolina; and High Point, North Carolina.

Rome lost a second television frequency 40 years later, when WZGA (UHF channel 14, now WPXA-TV) moved its operations to Atlanta after several years of operation. WROM is still on the air on 710 AM. WPXA is still licensed to Rome, while a digital fill-in translator for WSB-TV from Atlanta is licensed to Rome on digital channel 14, but mapped virtually to channel 2.

=== As WTVC ===
Channel 9 signed on from Chattanooga as full-power ABC affiliate WTVC on February 11, 1958. It still operates under the original license for WROM-TV. Chattanooga also became one of the smallest television markets in the country to have three VHF stations. WTVC is the only station in Chattanooga to have never had a secondary affiliation with another network.

WTVC developed a strong reputation for local programming in its early years. Among the shows that WTVC pioneered was the children's educational show Funtime with Marcia Kling. Shock Theater, which aired on Saturday nights, developed a cult following with WTVC programming director Tommy Reynolds dressed up as Dracula with the moniker "Doctor Shock" alongside his irreverent sidekick "Dingbat". The Bob Brandy Show, which aired in the afternoons, featured cartoons and kids activities hosted by WTVC advertising executive Bob Brandy, his wife Ingrid, and their horse Rebel.

In 1969, Martin Theaters was sold to J. B. Fuqua, a businessman from Augusta, Georgia. Fuqua also owned WJBF-TV in Augusta, WTVW in Evansville, Indiana, and KTHI-TV (now KVLY-TV) in Fargo, North Dakota. Over the next few years each station was sold with WTVC being purchased in 1980 by the Belo Corporation of Dallas, Texas. In 1984, Freedom Communications bought the station along with KFDM in Beaumont, marking the newspaper chain's second television acquisition. Belo put WTVC and KFDM on the market after it announced plans to purchase Corinthian Broadcasting from Dun & Bradstreet so that the company could comply with the FCC-mandated ownership limit of five VHF television stations which was in effect at the time.

When WTVC moved its operations to Chattanooga in 1958, it opened a studio at its transmitter on Signal Mountain. In 1966, it moved to new facilities in the Golden Gateway Shopping Center in downtown Chattanooga next to a Zayre department store. Over the years, however, the station outgrew the building. In January 2000, WTVC moved into a new digitally-equipped 26,000-square-foot (2,400 m^{2}) studio located adjacent to the Highway 58 / Highway 153 interchange.

After filing for Chapter 11 bankruptcy, Freedom announced on November 2, 2011, that it would sell its stations, including WTVC, to Sinclair Broadcast Group. The group deal closed on April 2, 2012.

== WTVC-DT2 ==
Following the purchase of non-license assets from Fox affiliate WDSI-TV by Sinclair, its Fox affiliation and programming moved to WTVC's second digital subchannel.

During a transition process that was completed on October 31, 2015, WTVC's second digital channel simulcast WDSI. On that date, when Sinclair launched their new network Comet, the Fox schedule and the intellectual unit for WDSI's main signal moved permanently to WTVC-DT2 under the on-air moniker "Fox Chattanooga". The programming on This TV which had been on WTVC-DT2 moved to WDSI's main signal, with Comet launching on WDSI-DT2; the MyNetworkTV subchannel was moved to WFLI-DT2, with the MeTV signal which had been carried on that slot moved to WFLI-DT3. Cable, satellite, and EPB viewers saw no change, as WTVC-DT2 took over the former channel slots for WDSI's main signal.

== Newscasts ==
As of August 2024, WTVC presently broadcasts 47 hours of locally produced newscasts each week (with 8 hours each weekday and 3 1/2 hours each on Saturdays and Sundays). In the event of special sports coverage overlapping news time, the station streams a live newscast on its website. The station also airs a public affairs show, This-N-That, which is produced separately from the news department, but does have news updates when necessary. Longtime personality Don Welch hosted the show until his retirement in 2014. James Howard became host of the show afterward.

Through the late-1960s and mid-1970s, WTVC branded its newscasts under the Eyewitness News label. In 1975, this switched to Action News. In the late-1980s, it was one of the first stations in the country to adopt the NewsChannel branding.

In the early 1990s, WTVC produced a 10 p.m. newscast for then-independent WFLI-TV, which was eventually canceled. In 1994, the station began airing a nightly 10 p.m. broadcast on Fox affiliate WDSI-TV using station meteorologists, sports anchors, news reporters and news video, while WDSI provided separate news anchors. In 2000, that station launched its own news department and aired local news on weekday mornings, weekday afternoons at 4, and nightly at 10. In 2004, the news department at WDSI closed down and a news share agreement with WTVC was re-established. After that point, WTVC produced Fox 61 First at 10 on WDSI. With the acquisition of WDSI-TV's non-license assets and Fox programming in 2015, the 10 p.m. newscast became branded as First at 10 on Fox Chattanooga.

From the 1960s through the 1970s, WTVC's newscasts were usually in last place, but it was not until new owners Belo took over, that the ratings began to favor WTVC. Since the mid-1980s, WTVC has waged a spirited battle with WRCB for first place in the local news ratings weekdays, while WDEF has usually trailed both stations. On March 1, 2014, WTVC launched the area's second-only weekend morning newscast. Named Good Morning Chattanooga Weekend, the broadcasts air from 6 to 7 a.m. and from 8 to 9 a.m. The weekend editions of Good Morning America air between the newscasts at 7 a.m.

== Technical information ==
=== Subchannels ===
The station's signal is multiplexed:

Subchannels of WTVC
Subchannel	Res.	Short name	Programming
9.1	720p	ABC	ABC
9.2	720p	FOX	Fox
9.3	480i	ROAR	Roar

On December 16, 2014, WTVC added a 24/7 local weather channel, affiliated with WeatherNation TV on digital channel 9.3. WeatherNation was dropped in favor of TBD (now Roar) on June 1, 2017.

=== Translator ===
- WPDP-CD 33 Cleveland

=== Analog-to-digital conversion ===
WTVC shut down its analog signal, over VHF channel 9, on June 12, 2009, the official date on which full-power television stations in the United States transitioned from analog to digital broadcasts under federal mandate. The station's digital signal relocated from its pre-transition UHF channel 35 to VHF channel 9 for post-transition operations.
