= The Big Broadcast =

1932 film

- Lobby card
- Directed by: Frank Tuttle
- Screenplay by: George Marion Jr.
- Based on: Wild Waves (play) by William Ford Manley
- Produced by: Benjamin Glazer (uncredited)
- Starring: Bing Crosby; Stuart Erwin; Eddie Lang
- Cinematography: George J. Folsey
- Music by: John Leipold (uncredited); Ralph Rainger (uncredited)
- Production company: Paramount Pictures
- Distributed by: Paramount Pictures
- Release date: October 14, 1932 (US)
- Running time: 80 minutes
- Country: United States
- Language: English
- Box office: $1 million (U.S. and Canada rentals)

The Big Broadcast is a 1932 American pre-Code musical comedy film directed by Frank Tuttle and starring Bing Crosby, Stuart Erwin, and Leila Hyams. Based on the play Wild Waves by William Ford Manley, the film is about a radio-singer who becomes a popular hit with audiences, but takes a disrespectful approach to his career. His repeated latenesses leads to the bankruptcy of the radio station, but his career is saved by a new friend who buys the station and gives him his job back.

The film co-stars George Burns and Gracie Allen in supporting roles. The Big Broadcast was produced by Paramount Pictures and was the first in a series of four Big Broadcast movies.

== Plot ==
Bing Crosby, an irresponsible radio singer at WADX, faces dismissal due to his chronic tardiness and engagement to the notorious Mona Lowe. After an unpleasant conversation with station manager George Burns, a despondent Crosby visits a speakeasy. There, he encounters miserable Texas oilman Leslie McWhinney, who has been swindled out of $100,000 by a woman and does not recognize Crosby. A newspaper article reveals that Mona has betrayed Crosby as well, and the jilted men bond.

That night, in Crosby's apartment, a power outage and heavy drinking lead the two to a suicide pact, and they attempt to end their lives by gas poisoning in the kitchen. As they near death, they are haunted by a ghostly skull and an accordion player singing "Here Lies Love". They are rescued by a doorman and Anita Rogers, Leslie's former fiancée and a secretary at WADX, who has now fallen for Crosby. The next morning, Crosby and Leslie awaken, and Anita confesses her love for Crosby to Leslie. Crosby invites Leslie to WADX for a job. Meanwhile, Burns is overwhelmed by the hijinks of his stenographer, Gracie Allen. After multiple mishaps, Burns loses WADX, and repo men begin hauling away the furniture. A confused Leslie, seeking employment, unwittingly helps carry out a desk before realizing the station is going out of business.

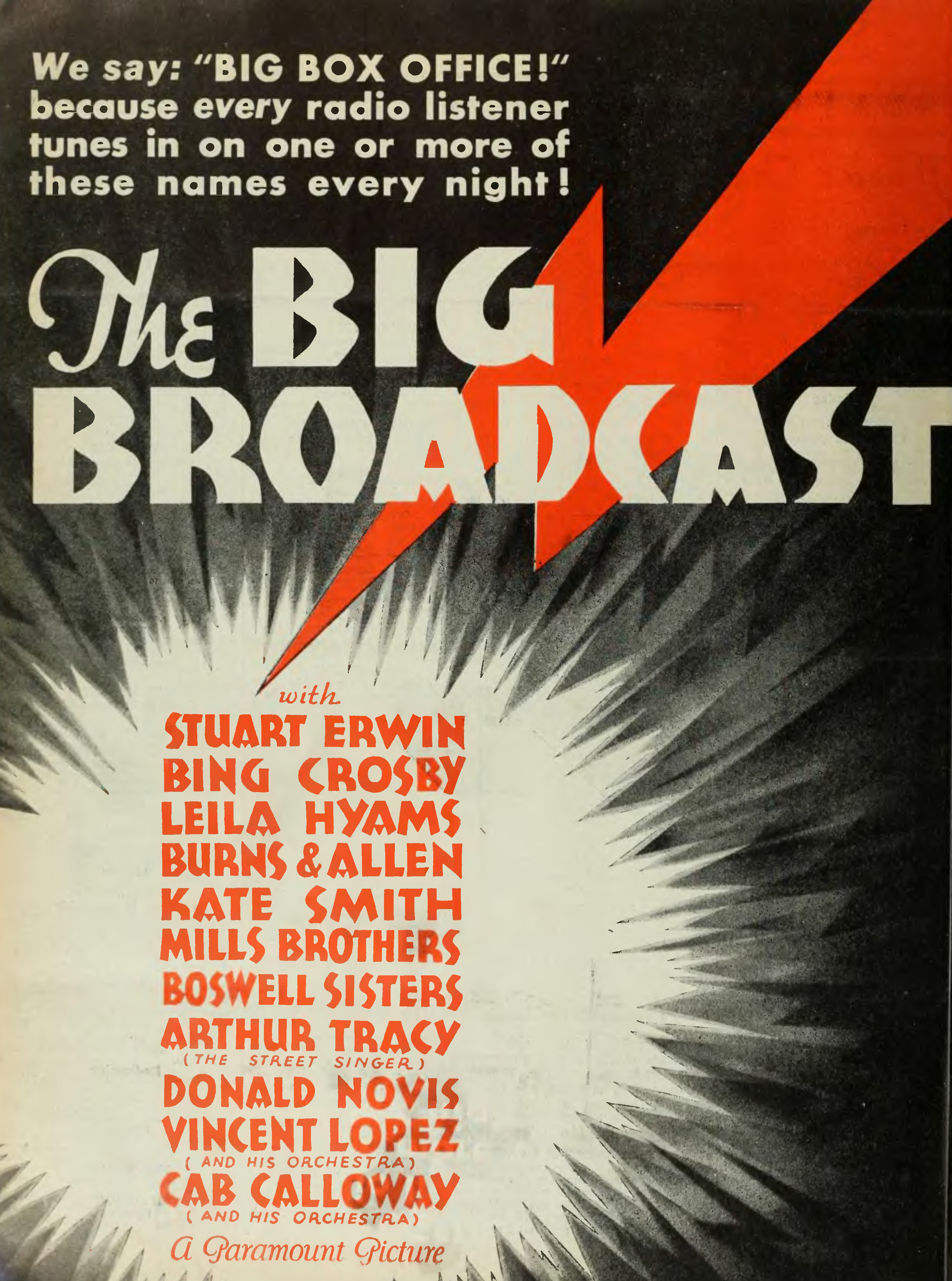
The Big Broadcast ad from The Film Daily, 1932

Leslie reveals he still has $900,000 and uses it to buy the station, driven to help Crosby and Anita. He proposes a star-studded "big broadcast" to save the station. Mona reappears and reinstates the wedding. The distracted Crosby forgets his budding romance with Anita and leaves with Mona hours before the big broadcast, putting the show at risk as he is the headline performer. Leslie encourages Crosby and Anita's relationship, and Anita admits that Crosby reminds her of Leslie, particularly his voice. She asks Leslie for a kiss, which he awkwardly grants. As the broadcast begins without Crosby, Leslie visits Mona's apartment and finds him pretending to be drunk on the sofa to skip the performance and stay with Mona. Leslie pleads with him to return for Anita's sake before leaving. Following his departure, Mona demands to know who Anita is, and when Crosby refuses, she hurls a vase at his head. Crosby turns furiously, rolling up his sleeves.

Leslie searches desperately for a record of Crosby singing "Please" to play on air and fake a live performance. His slapstick-laden quest ends with him playing a warped record during the broadcast in a last-ditch effort. The effect is terrible, and with no singer present when the band begins playing, Leslie anxiously jumps in, delivering untrained, stumbling vocals and botched whistling. Anita, listening to the broadcast, recognizes Leslie's voice. Moved by his bravery and sincerity, she rekindles her romance with him. Crosby arrives and takes over for the second verse, improvising new lyrics that urge Anita to return to Leslie; his feigned irresponsibility had been a scheme to reunite the couple. Mona, sporting a black eye from their earlier confrontation, pouts in the booth, admiring yet fearful of Crosby.

== Cast ==
- Bing Crosby as Bing Crosby
- Stuart Erwin as Leslie McWhinney
- Leila Hyams as Anita Rogers
- Sharon Lynn as Mona
- George Burns as himself
- Gracie Allen as herself
- George Barbier as Clapsaddle
- Ralph Robertson as Announcer
- Alex Melesh as Animal Man
- Spec O'Donnell as Office Boy
- Anna Chandler as Mrs. Cohen
- Thomas Carrigan as Officer
- The Mills Brothers as Themselves
- Irving Bacon as Prisoner
- The Boswell Sisters as Themselves
- Cab Calloway as himself
- Leonid Kinskey as Ivan
- Eddie Lang as himself
- Vincent Lopez & His Orchestra as Themselves
- Dewey Robinson as Basso
- Kate Smith as herself
- Arthur Tracy as himself

== Production ==
=== Filming locations ===
- Hollywood, Los Angeles, California, USA (main scenes)
- Paramount Studios, Astoria, Queens, New York City, New York, USA

== Soundtrack ==
Introductory sequence (signature tunes): "Where the Blue of the Night" (sung by Bing Crosby); "When the Moon Comes over the Mountain" (sung by Kate Smith); "Shout, Sister, Shout" (sung by The Boswell Sisters); "Minnie the Moocher" (sung by Cab Calloway); "Goodbye Blues" (sung by The Mills Brothers).
"I Surrender Dear" (snatch only - sung by Bing Crosby)
"Dinah" (sung by Bing Crosby)
"Here Lies Love" (sung by Arthur Tracy, and again by Bing Crosby)
"I've Got Five Dollars" (snatch only - sung by Bing Crosby)
"Please" (sung by Bing Crosby)
"Tiger Rag" (sung by The Mills Brothers)
"Drummer Man" (Vincent Lopez and His Orchestra)
"Trees" (sung by Donald Novis)
"Crazy People" (Sung by The Boswell Sisters)
"It Was So Beautiful" (sung by Kate Smith)
"Kicking the Gong Around" (sung by Cab Calloway)

Crosby recorded the songs for Brunswick Records.

== American Film Institute recognition ==
- 2004: AFI's 100 Years...100 Songs:
  - "Where the Blue of the Night Meets the Gold of the Day" – Nominated

== Following films in series ==
- The Big Broadcast of 1936
- The Big Broadcast of 1937
- The Big Broadcast of 1938

== Reception ==
It was Bing Crosby's first starring role in a full-length film and generally he got good reviews. "The film is a credit to Crosby as a screen juve possibility, although he has a decidedly dizzy and uncertain role which makes him behave as no human being does." The New York American commented: "Bing Crosby is the star, make no mistake about it. The “Blue of the Night” boy is a picture personality, as he demonstrated in his two-reelers. He has a camera face and a camera presence. Always at ease, he troupes like a veteran." The Hollywood Citizen News had more to say: ".... Bing Crosby croons several attractive songs which seem destined to enjoy wide popularity. For that matter, he needn’t be ashamed of his acting either. Burns and Allen have several good comedy sequences, and Cab Calloway and his orchestra are excellent in one sequence. All the radio stars are heard much as you hear them on the air. The novelty of seeing them may be an attraction. But Tuttle has not relied upon the drawing power of that novelty. He has injected little touches of fantasy, hints of satire, moments of slapstick comedy and a general impression of jolly good humor. He tells you frankly that this picture is not to be taken seriously and I think that most audiences will believe him and thereby enjoy it."

During its initial release, the film earned $775,000 in North American theatrical rentals.

== Also see ==
- Microphone RCA 4A used in closing.
