= WGOW (AM) =

News/talk radio station in Chattanooga, Tennessee

Coordinates: 35°04′05″N 85°20′04″W

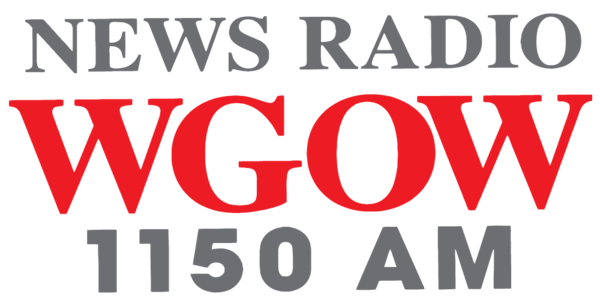
- Chattanooga, Tennessee; United States
- Broadcast area: Chattanooga metropolitan area
- Frequency: 1150 kHz
- Branding: NewsRadio 1150

Programming
- Format: News/talk
- Affiliations: ABC News Radio; Westwood One; Tennessee Titans Radio Network

Ownership
- Owner: Cumulus Media; (Radio License Holding CBC, LLC)
- Sister stations: WGOW-FM; WOGT; WSKZ

History
- First air date: 1936 (as WAPO)
- Former call signs: WAPO (1936–1969)

Technical information
- Licensing authority: FCC
- Facility ID: 54526
- Class: B
- Power: 5,000 watts day; 1,000 watts night

Links
- Public license information: Public file; LMS
- Webcast: Listen live
- Website: www.wgowam.com

WGOW (1150 kHz) is a commercial AM radio station in Chattanooga, Tennessee. It is owned by Cumulus Media, and broadcasts a news/talk format. Cumulus also owns WGOW-FM 102.3, which simulcasts some shows shared with WGOW AM, but has its own schedule most of the day. The radio studios and offices are on Pineville Drive in Chattanooga.

By day, WGOW transmits with 5,000 watts non-directional, but at night, to avoid interfering with other stations on 1150 AM, WGOW reduces power to 1,000 watts and uses a directional antenna with a three-tower array. The transmitter is on Daugherty Lane in Chattanooga's Moccasin Bend neighborhood, near the Tennessee River.

== Programming ==
Weekdays begin with a local news and information show, "The Morning Press", hosted by Jim Reynolds, Kevin West and Brian Joyce. The rest of the schedule is made up of nationally syndicated conservative talk programs, mostly from co-owned Westwood One: Chris Plante, Dan Bongino, Michael Knowles, Ben Shapiro, Mark Levin, John Batchelor. Heard overnight and early mornings are Red Eye Radio and America in the Morning.

Weekends feature shows on money, health and technology. Weekend programs include Kim Komando, Jim Bohannon, Free Talk Live and Tom Sullivan. WGOW is an affiliate of the Tennessee Titans Radio Network. Most hours begin with world and national news from ABC Radio News.

== History ==
=== WAPO ===
The station first signed on in 1936 as WAPO at 1420 kHz. It was Chattanooga's second station, after WDOD (1280 AM).

WAPO was owned by W. A. Patterson and had its studios on Foust Street at Rossville Boulevard. It was powered at 1,000 watts and was a daytimer, required to go off the air at sunset. By the early 1940s the frequency was changed to 1150, giving WAPO full time authorization.

=== WGOW ===
WAPO was purchased by Ted Turner in 1968. The station changed its call sign to WGOW and adopted a Top 40 format on January 1, 1969. By the early 1980s, the station had evolved into more of a full service adult contemporary format. It added more talk shows during the 1980s, and in 1988, WGOW officially switched to a talk radio format.

In 2005, the station made waves by moving popular midday syndicated host Rush Limbaugh to sister station 102.3 WGOW-FM, resulting in a slight increase in ratings for the FM station, but a precipitous ratings drop for the AM. Limbaugh subsequently returned to the AM lineup in 2006.
