= WGOW-FM =

Radio station in Chattanooga, Tennessee

Coordinates: 35.196°N 85.229°W

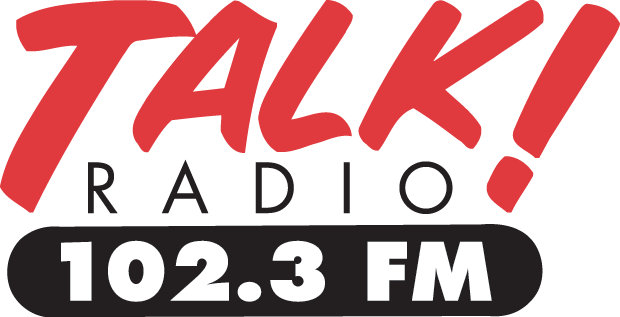
- Soddy-Daisy, Tennessee; United States
- Broadcast area: Chattanooga metropolitan area
- Frequency: 102.3 MHz
- Branding: Talk Radio 102.3

Programming
- Format: Talk radio
- Affiliations: ABC News Radio; Premiere Networks; Westwood One; Tennessee Titans Radio Network

Ownership
- Owner: Cumulus Media; (Radio License Holding CBC, LLC)
- Sister stations: WGOW; WOGT; WSKZ

History
- First air date: July 4, 1977
- Former call signs: WZDQ (1977–1989); WFXS (1989–1996)

Technical information
- Licensing authority: FCC
- Facility ID: 53956
- Class: A
- ERP: 6,000 watts
- HAAT: 87 meters (285 ft)

Links
- Public license information: Public file; LMS
- Webcast: Listen live
- Website: www.wgow.com

WGOW-FM (102.3 MHz) is a commercial radio station licensed to Soddy-Daisy, Tennessee, and serving the Chattanooga metropolitan area. It is owned by Cumulus Media, and broadcasts a talk radio format. Its radio studios and offices are on Pineville Drive in Chattanooga.

WGOW-FM has an effective radiated power (ERP) of 6,000 watts. Its transmitter is off Caves Springs Road in Chattanooga, near Chickamauga Creek.

== Programming ==
Weekdays begin with a local news and information show, "The Morning Press", hosted by Jim Reynolds, Kevin West and Brian Joyce. Late mornings feature a talk show from Brad Giese and a local sports talk show airs in afternoon drive time, hosted by Scott McMahen and Joe Varner. The rest of the schedule is made up of nationally syndicated talk shows: Dave Ramsey, Free Talk Live, Armstrong & Getty and Red Eye Radio.

Weekends feature shows on money, health, movies, the outdoors and cars. Weekend programs include Jim Bohannon and Tom Sullivan. WGOW is an affiliate of the Tennessee Titans Radio Network. Most hours begin with world and national news from ABC News Radio.

== History ==
The 102.3 frequency was started in 1977 as WZDQ. It then became Kicks briefly, followed by Choo Choo 102 playing The Music of Your Life. It then became Fox 102 at Four Squares in Chattanooga.

In January 1994, the SportTalk hosts from WGOW moved to WBDX, which broadcast from Eastgate Mall on the 102.7 FM frequency, to anchor afternoon drive on the otherwise music station. Kevin West came over as program director and Jim Reynolds as morning co-host and sports director in April of that year and the station went all talk on May 2, 1994, taking the 102.3 FM frequency (WFXS) from Fox 102 in March 1995 and selling 102.7 to Partners for Christian Media, who started J103. West went back to WGOW in September 1995 and the company bought the 102.3 frequency in October 1996, branding it WGOW-FM and bringing all of the former WGOW AM talent that had gone to Eastgate back to Pineville Road.
