= WMSR (AM) =

- Manchester, Tennessee; United States
- Broadcast area: Southern Middle Tennessee
- Frequency: 1320 kHz
- Branding: Thunder Radio

Programming
- Format: News/Talk
- Affiliations: Tennessee Titans Radio Network; Nashville Predators Radio Network; Atlanta Braves Radio Network

Ownership
- Owner: Josh and Holly Peterson

History
- Call sign meaning: Manchester

Technical information
- Licensing authority: FCC
- Facility ID: 12205
- Class: D
- Power: 5,000 watts day 79 watts night
- Transmitter coordinates: 35°28′03″N 86°05′42″W
- Translators: 106.7 W294CV (Tullahoma); 107.9 W300BL (Manchester)

Links
- Public license information: Public file; LMS
- Website: www.thunder1320.com

WMSR (1320 kHz, "Thunder Radio") is an American broadcast AM radio station licensed to serve the community of Manchester, Tennessee. The station's broadcast license is held by Coffee County Broadcasting, Inc. WMSR programming is also broadcast on 106.7 FM via broadcast translator W294CV and on 107.9 FM via W300BL.

WMSR went on the air with 1000 Watts in 1957, owned by the late Murray Chumley. Studios were located on the McMinnville Highway one block away from Highway 41 intersection in a small strip center (now demolished). Programming was a mix of Country and Rock. The transmitter was located on Oakdale St.

In 1962 new studios were constructed adjacent to the transmitter/tower, power was increased to 5000 Watts and WMSR FM at 99.7 went on the air with 20,000 Watts E.R.P. The FM station was converted to stereo in 1966. The format was easy listening, automated in daytime, live at night. WMSR was an affiliate of The Mutual Broadcasting System, and a member of N.A.B. FM Power was increased to 30,000 Watts E.R.P. in 1979, and the automation was upgraded to Harris 9002 microcomputer control. Some of the original air personalities were: Chuck Rigney, Joe Sullivan, Dale Hendrix, Creed Crowder, Roy Wood, Martha Grider, Jim Vernon, Ken Burger, Jim Gilmore, Johnny Hill, Jim Wegner, Murray Chumley, Russ Daniel, Roger Dotson, Libby St John, Don Aaron, Gary Beaty, Fritz Niggeler and Vernon Bogle. Engineers were Bill Spraggins and Norman "Sarge" Reynolds. Football/Basketball Sports Director was Winston Wallace.

The station was known for having the latest and best equipment available, primarily RCA, Collins and Gates. The FM was notable for its pristine audio. In addition to the main studios, WMSR had a fully equipped mobile studio.

As of 2019, WMSR is owned by Josh and Holly Peterson.

Former logo

== Programming ==
WMSR broadcasts a news/talk format to the southern Middle Tennessee area. Local programming on WMSR includes The Morning Show with Holly and Josh Monday through Friday, a tradio program called "Swap and Shop", Connecting Coffee County with Tiffany weekdays from 3-6 p.m.; plus specialty programs which include "Behind the Wheel" on Monday's, The Fan Zone on Saturday's. Specialty weekend programming includes The Coffee Coaches Show on Saturdays from 10-11 a.m.

WMSR provides live broadcasts of Coffee County Central High School athletics, including football, men's and women's basketball, baseball, and softball. The Hometown Sports Series also allows for broadcasts of high school soccer and volleyball, as well as various Coffee Middle School and Westwood Middle School sports. Thunder Radio WMSR also an affiliate of the Atlanta Braves, Tennessee Titans, and Nashville Predators, National news is provided by Fox Radio. Syndicated programming includes Coast to Coast AM, a delayed broadcast of Rick Burgess Show, The Dan Bongino Show and a financial advice talk show hosted by Dave Ramsey.
