= WCBL (AM) =

- Benton, Kentucky; United States
- Broadcast area: Jackson Purchase
- Frequency: 1290 kHz
- Branding: Great Oldies 99.1

Programming
- Format: Oldies
- Affiliations: St. Louis Cardinals Radio Network Titans Radio Network UK Sports Network

Ownership
- Owner: Richard and Laurie Hendrickson and Chris and Lori Freeland; (Freeland Broadcasting Co, Inc.)
- Sister stations: WCCK, WCBL-FM

History
- First air date: December 13, 1954; 71 years ago
- Call sign meaning: Calvert City-Benton-Lakes

Technical information
- Licensing authority: FCC
- Facility ID: 53943
- Class: D
- Power: 5,000 watts (day); 53 watts (night)
- Transmitter coordinates: 36°51′31″N 88°20′11″W

Links
- Public license information: Public file; LMS
- Website: marshallcountydaily.com

Simulcast station
- WCBL-FM
- Grand Rivers, Kentucky; United States
- Frequency: 99.1 MHz

History
- First air date: 1966
- Former frequencies: 102.3 MHz

Technical information
- Facility ID: 53944
- Class: C3
- ERP: 16,000 watts
- HAAT: 127 meters (417 ft)
- Transmitter coordinates: 36°51′31″N 88°20′11″W

Links
- Public license information: Public file; LMS

WCBL (1290 AM) is an oldies-formatted radio station licensed to Benton. Kentucky, United States, and serving the broader Jackson Purchase region of western Kentucky, including Paducah. The station is owned by Jim Freeland in conjunction with Calvert City, Kentucky–licensed classic country station WCCK (95.7 FM) The station's studios and transmitter are located on Eggner's Ferry Road in Benton.

In addition to its primary AM signal, WCBL is also simulcast on full-power station WCBL-FM (99.1 MHz). Licensed to Grand Rivers, it broadcasts from a transmitter in rural southern Livingston County southeast of Smithland.

== History ==
The station began broadcasting on December 13, 1954. It was originally owned by local politician James Shelby McCallum, who also owned a theater in the town of Benton and a few other towns. He also started WCBL-FM (broadcasting at 102.3 MHz at the time) when it was launched in 1966. McCallum once persuaded then-future Kentucky governor Edward T. Breathitt to go into politics at a Hopkinsville-based theater he owned at that time. McCallum was also involved in civic matters locally in Marshall County, where Benton is located, and also served as part-owner of Benton's cable television system. McCallum owned the station under licensee Purchase Broadcasting until his 1987 death. Afterwards, owner Jim Freeland, who became general manager of the station seven years before, bought the stations; he remains owner and president of Freeland Broadcasting.

WCBL mostly played country music for much of its first three decades on the air until 2000, when that format was moved to WCCK. WCBL-AM now simulcasts the oldies format with WCBL-FM.

== In popular culture ==
In 1980, WCBL's name and likeness as well as local restaurant Hutchen's Bar-B-Que was used in the filming of a scene in the Loretta Lynn biography movie, Coal Miner's Daughter. The filming, however, did not take place in the actual WCBL studios. One of that movie's writers was from the area.
