= WOGT =

Coordinates: 35.126°N 85.290°W

- East Ridge, Tennessee; United States
- Broadcast area: Chattanooga metropolitan area
- Frequency: 107.9 MHz
- Branding: New Country 107.9

Programming
- Format: Country
- Affiliations: Westwood One

Ownership
- Owner: Cumulus Media; (Radio License Holding CBC, LLC)
- Sister stations: WGOW, WGOW-FM, WSKZ

History
- First air date: November 9, 1990 (as WJRX)
- Former call signs: WJRX (1990–1993)

Technical information
- Licensing authority: FCC
- Facility ID: 54527
- Class: C3
- ERP: 25,000 watts
- HAAT: 100 meters (328 ft)

Links
- Public license information: Public file; LMS
- Webcast: Listen Live
- Website: 1079country.com

WOGT (107.9 FM) is a commercial radio station licensed to East Ridge, Tennessee. It is owned by Cumulus Media and serves the Chattanooga metropolitan area. The station airs a country music format.

Studios and offices are on Pineville Road in Chattanooga. The transmitter is off Pinehurst Avenue in Red Bank.

== History ==
On November 9, 1990, the station first signed on as WJRX. It broadcast at 3,000 watts and was owned by Virginia Sussex Settler. It aired a Christian contemporary music format, calling itself "RX 107."

In 1993 the station switched its call sign to WOGT. It had an oldies format known as "GT 108" which later changed to "Oldies 107.9" then back to GT 108. On July 29, 2005, it became a country music station called "107.9 The Duke." It was the home of one of America's few married morning show hosts with "Duane & Abby" hosted by Duane Shannon and Abby Summers, later at Country station WGKX in Memphis.

On November 24, 2010, at 12 noon, after playing Garth Brooks' The Dance, WOGT changed its format to classic hits, branded as "107.9 Big FM". The first song on Big FM was "Feelin' Stronger Every Day" by Chicago.

On October 31, 2014, WOGT flipped back to country, joining the Nash Icon network as 107.9 Nash Icon.

On November 5, 2020, WOGT dropped its country music format and began stunting with a Christmas music format, branded as "Christmas 107.9, with the station promoting "something new for Chattanooga" to come on Monday, December 28, at 6AM. At that time, WOGT rebranded as "New Country 107.9" with a shift to a more contemporary playlist.

== Previous logo ==
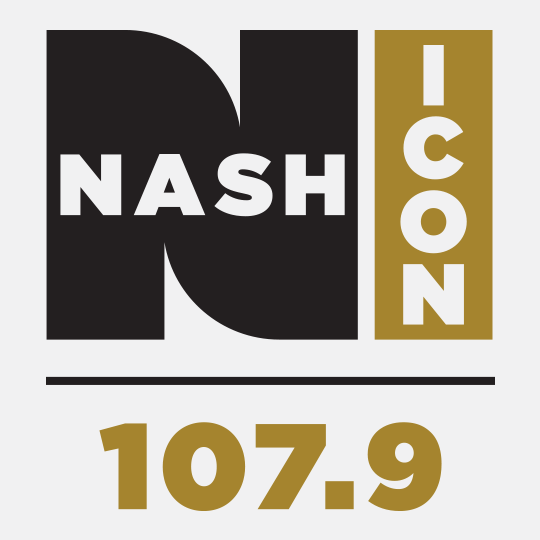
