= WMCP =

- Columbia, Tennessee; United States
- Frequency: 1280 kHz
- Branding: Columbia's Country

Programming
- Format: Country
- Affiliations: Citadel Media

Ownership
- Owner: Radio Maria, Inc.

Technical information
- Licensing authority: FCC
- Facility ID: 40740
- Class: B
- Power: 5,000 watts day 500 watts night
- Transmitter coordinates: 35°37′8.00″N 86°58′52.00″W
- Translator: (98.9 MHz) W255DK (Columbia)

Links
- Public license information: Public file; LMS

WMCP (1280 AM, "Columbia's Country") is a radio station broadcasting a country music format. Licensed to Columbia, Tennessee, United States, the station is currently owned by Radio Maria, Inc., and features programming from Citadel Media.

== History of call letters ==
The call sign WMCP previously was assigned to an FM station in Baltimore, Maryland. It began broadcasting March 14, 1948, and was owned and operated by Belvedere Broadcasting Corporation.
