= Horseleg Lake =

Lake in the state of Minnesota, United States

- Location within Minnesota
- Location: Isanti County, Minnesota
- Coordinates: 45°28′8″N 93°2′59″W
- Type: lake

Horseleg Lake is a lake in Isanti County, in the U.S. state of Minnesota.

Horseleg Lake was so named on account of its outline being shaped like the leg of a horse.

== See also ==
- List of lakes in Minnesota
