= Fox News Radio =

American radio network

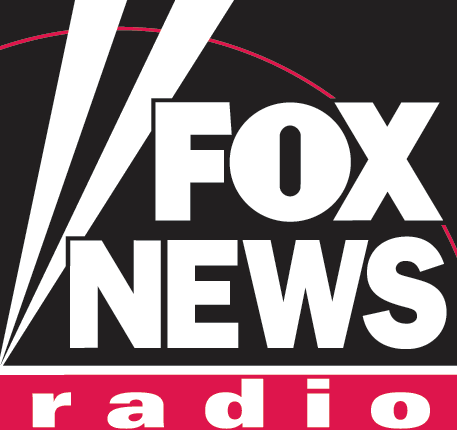
- Type: Satellite-delivered radio network
- Country: United States; Canada

Programming
- Format: News/talk

Ownership
- Owner: Fox Corporation
- Parent: Fox News Media

History
- Launch date: 2003

Coverage
- Availability: Various AM/FM stations, SiriusXM Satellite Radio and streaming

Links
- Website: radio.foxnews.com

Fox News Radio is an American radio network owned by Fox News. It is syndicated to over 500 AM and FM radio stations across the United States. It also supplies programming for three channels on SiriusXM Satellite Radio.

== History ==
In 2003, Fox News began syndicating one-minute radio updates to radio stations via syndication service Westwood One. With the success of the one-minute updates, Fox opted to make a full foray into network radio news services and began hiring a staff of 60 radio professionals.

On June 1, 2005, Fox News Radio began providing hourly five-minute newscasts at the beginning of each hour and a one-minute newscast at the half-hour mark. At its launch, 60 stations were signed up for the network. Many more joined under a deal struck between Fox and Clear Channel Communications (now iHeartMedia), the largest owner of radio stations in America. This allowed many Clear Channel stations to carry Fox News Radio newscasts and allowed Fox News Radio to use and nationally distribute news content produced by Clear Channel. Several of those stations ended decades-long relationships dating back to the Golden Age of Radio with CBS Radio News and ABC News Radio to carry Fox News Radio.

=== Fox News Talk ===
Fox News Talk

Fox also produced Fox News Talk, a long-form network with conservative talk programs featuring Fox News personalities. The programs are broadcast on terrestrial radio stations in the United States and were formerly found at SiriusXM Satellite Radio's digital platform on Channel 450. Channel 450 also carried the five-minute Fox Newscast at the start of each hour and the one-minute Fox News update at 30 minutes after each hour.

After advertising from XM Satellite Radio regarding a new exclusivity deal for Fox News content, FNC's full-time audio simulcast was pulled from Sirius Satellite Radio on January 1, 2006. Fox News Talk launched on XM the next day. After listener demand, along with some FNC hosts wanting listeners of both services to have access, the exclusivity deal was broken and the FNC simulcast returned to Sirius on March 14, 2006, along with the new Fox News Talk channel.

In April 2006, morning show host Tony Snow left the network when he became White House Press Secretary. Replacing him was the duo of Brian Kilmeade, and Andrew Napolitano as Brian and the Judge. Napolitano left the show in 2010, leaving Kilmeade to host solo.

XM Radio Canada added the channel on June 1, 2007.

In September 2007, Tom Sullivan joined Fox News Radio and helped launch Fox Business. 10 years later, Sullivan left Fox News in 2017 to join a national syndicator with his radio show.

Also carried was Westwood One's syndicated The Radio Factor with former FNC personality Bill O'Reilly. O'Reilly was moved out of the live time slot on January 15, 2009, anticipating his departure from the show on February 26 of that year. Fox News announced it would move John Gibson to the noon-to-3 p.m. time slot, after Bill O'Reilly left the time slot. Gibson also left Fox News Talk in June 2017.

On May 4, 2011, Fox News Talk moved to XM 126 from XM 168 and to Sirius 126 from Sirius 145. By the end, it was carried on both Sirius and XM's channel 450. The Fox News Talk service ended on October 12, 2019. However, the Fox News Talk name remains as part of an internal distribution service Fox Corporation provides though its existing audio distribution agreement with iHeartMedia for its talk shows.

=== Fox News Headlines 24/7 ===
In late 2015, Fox News Radio began offering Fox News Headlines 24/7 exclusively to SiriusXM subscribers on Channel 115. It's a live-anchored all news channel with a dedicated editorial staff, providing a panorama of the day's news "from Hollywood to Wall Street to Main Street." News is presented in 15-minute blocks. Six anchors each day are assigned to eight-hour air shifts, with one hour on and one hour off over the course of the shift. Additional features include sports at :05/:35, business at :12/:42 and entertainment news at :21/:51. The station does not suspend its format for breaking news coverage, which is the role of Fox News Channel. The slogans are "The news you want, the moment you want it" and "It's news, ready when you are". It is a companion channel to the audio simulcasts of the Fox News Channel on SiriusXM 114 and Fox Business on SiriusXM 113.

== Newscasts ==
The Fox News Radio Network provides around-the-clock newscasts at the beginning of each hour and at 30 minutes past the hour. Depending on a station's affiliation, it either receives a five-minute newscast at the beginning of each hour or a one-minute newscast which runs at the beginning of the hour or at 30 minutes after the hour. Breaking news reports (dubbed 'Fox News Alerts'), business news updates, correspondent and expert interviews, special broadcasts marking historic or newsworthy events, anchored live coverage and clean feeds of news events complete the affiliate service package. Affiliates also have access to a web site with a constantly updating selection of newsmaker audio and correspondent reports.

The five minute audio version of the hourly newscast consists of two minutes of news, one minute of advertisements or Fox promotions and two more minutes of news. In February 2017, the audio version eliminated the commercial break at the two-minute mark, so that the newscast ran for only four minutes. The commercial minute was restored in May 2017, returning it to a five-minute newscast. It is available as a podcast. As of 2011, typically only one MP3 file, the most recent one, is available at any time. The Eastern Time hour number converted to 24-hour time is incorporated into the file name (for example, 5minpodcast21.mp3 for 9 pm). However, if there has been exceptional news (a "Fox News Alert"), the file for that hour's podcast will be retained for a few hours. The current hour's file is usually available within 10 minutes of its broadcast, i.e., by a quarter past the hour.

=== Anchors ===
- Dave Anthony - Weekday mornings (5-minute newscast)
- Chris Foster - Fill-in
- Lisa Brady - Weekday middays (5-minute newscast)
- Lisa Lacerra - Weekday evenings (5-minute newscast)
- Pam Puso - Weekends
- Paul Stevens - Weekends
- Jack Callaghan - Weekends
- Carmen Roberts - Weekends
- Chris DeMeo - Overnights
- Angelo Bavaro - Overnights
- Ted Lindner - Overnights
- Deborah Valentine - Overnights
- Sue Guzman - Overnights
- Tom Graham - Fill-in

=== Correspondents ===
- New York City: Gurnal Scott, Tonya J. Powers, Lilian Woo, Hilarie Barsky (business), Ginny Kosola (business), Jared Max (sports)
- Washington, D.C.: Jared Halpern, Jill Nado
- Los Angeles: Jessica Rosenthal
- Chicago: Jeff Monosso
- Miami: Eben Brown
- London: Jonathan Savage

== Talk programming ==
Fox News Radio syndicates the following weekday talk radio programs:

- The Brian Kilmeade Show (9 a.m. to 12 p.m. E.T.)
- The Will Cain Show (12 p.m. to 1 p.m. E.T.)
- Fox Across America with Jimmy Failla (12 p.m. to 3 p.m. E.T.)
- The Guy Benson Show (3 p.m. to 6 p.m. E.T.)

In June 2017, Fox News Radio re-organized its talk show line up. After over a decade as "Kilmeade and Friends," the 9 a.m. show was re-branded as "The Brian Kilmeade Show." The noon show, which had been hosted by John Gibson, was turned over to Todd Starnes. The 3 p.m. show, which had been hosted by Tom Sullivan, was turned over to Tom Shillue. Sullivan continues on his flagship Sacramento radio stations KFBK and KFBK-FM, and affiliates via syndication by Talk Media Network.

Alan Colmes, who hosted the 6 p.m. to 9 p.m. slot, died unexpectedly on February 23, 2017.

On May 7, 2018, a new program Benson & Harf debuted from 6 p.m. to 8 p.m.; it was discontinued in May 2019 when Harf left Fox News Radio and Guy Benson replaced Tom Shillue as host of the 3 p.m. show.

Todd Starnes provided weekday commentaries and hosted the 12 p.m. to 3 p.m. show from July 2017 until October 2019 when he was fired by Fox News for remarks made during a Fox Nation discussion in which Starnes agreed with a guest that Democrats worship Moloch, an ancient demon god. Starnes' 12 p.m. to 3 p.m. program was replaced by the Fox Across America program which had a variety of hosts, until March 9, 2020, when Jimmy Failla was named the permanent host of the show.

In January 2024, Fox News Radio added the one-hour Will Cain Show to its talk radio line-up. Cain had been doing a podcast for Fox and is the co-host of Fox & Friends Weekend on the Fox News Channel.

During prime time hours, the AM/FM syndicated version of Fox News Radio carries the audio from Fox News Channel's primetime programs (The Five, Hannity, The Ingraham Angle, Jesse Watters Primetime, and Gutfeld!) on a delay. The SiriusXM version of the Fox News Talk offers these feeds live on Sirius XM channel 114, so the Sirius XM Channel 450 feed instead carries repeats of Fox News Talk's daytime radio shows. Repeats of weekday shows also air over the weekend, along with several once-a-week talk shows, including I'll Tell You What with Dana Perino and Chris Stirewalt, and From Washington with Jared Halpern, and Fox News Sunday.

On September 4, 2019, SiriusXM and Fox News announced a long-term extension of their broadcast agreement for Fox News Channel, Fox Business Network, and Fox News Headlines 24/7 Channel to continue to be distributed via SiriusXM. The agreement also included Fox News primetime programming to be made available on-demand via SiriusXM and Pandora.

On June 8, 2020, Fox News Media and SiriusXM announced the rollout of their planned expansion, with all Fox News Podcasts’ original programming now being available via Pandora. Additionally, the platform’s daily one hour morning news radio program, The Fox News Rundown, is now airing weekday mornings on the SiriusXM Patriot Channel 125.

== See also ==
- Fox News
- Radio broadcasting
- Radio in the United States
