= WSKZ =

Radio station in Chattanooga, Tennessee

Coordinates: 35.162°N 85.318°W

- Chattanooga, Tennessee; United States
- Broadcast area: Chattanooga and Vicinity
- Frequency: 106.5 MHz
- Branding: KZ106

Programming
- Format: Classic rock
- Affiliations: Premiere Networks; Westwood One

Ownership
- Owner: Cumulus Media; (Radio License Holding CBC, LLC)
- Sister stations: WGOW, WGOW-FM, WOGT

History
- First air date: December 1960 (as WLOM); August 19,1978 (as WSKZ)
- Former call signs: WLOM (1960–1974); WYNQ (1974–1978)

Technical information
- Licensing authority: FCC
- Facility ID: 54525
- Class: C
- ERP: 100,000 watts
- HAAT: 329 meters

Links
- Public license information: Public file; LMS
- Webcast: Listen Live
- Website: kz106.com

WSKZ (106.5 FM) is a commercial radio station in Chattanooga, Tennessee. The station operates under a classic rock format and is branded as KZ106. The station is one of four stations operating in the Chattanooga broadcast area by Cumulus Media. Its studios are located on Pineville Road in Chattanooga, and its transmitter is located in Signal Mountain.

== History ==
The station became WSKZ in August 1978. The station was formerly co-owned with their nearby AM station WGOW during its early years, but by 1981 the station became a Top 40/CHR format. WSKZ is the only FM radio station in Chattanooga that broadcasts a fully-fledged Top 40/CHR station. Beginning in 1985, unlike most Top 40 stations, WSKZ began fledging into a similar "Rock-40" format lean (similar to KEGL in the Dallas-Fort Worth Metroplex in Texas). Its "rock" formula was dropped when the format began adding more mainstream titles during the middle of 1987.

The station flipped back to "Rock 40" in connection to its competition against a "new" Top 40/CHR station WBDX in 1989. WSKZ continued its run as a Top 40/CHR station until 1994, when WSKZ decided to change to their current Classic Rock format.

As of 2024, WSKZ is celebrating its 45th year of broadcasting.

WSKZ is an affiliate of the John Boy and Billy morning show and Steve Gorman Rocks! on weeknights.

WSKZ is the home of University of Tennessee Football on the Vol Network for the Chattanooga market.
