= WQMV =

Radio station in Waverly, Tennessee

- Waverly, Tennessee; United States
- Frequency: 1060 kHz
- Branding: WQMV AM 1060

Programming
- Format: Oldies

Ownership
- Owner: DCDL Media

History
- First air date: September 25, 1963
- Former call signs: WPHC (1963–1995)

Technical information
- Licensing authority: FCC
- Facility ID: 41866
- Class: D
- Power: 1,000 watts (day); 4 watts (night)
- Transmitter coordinates: 36°5′15.00″N 87°51′18.00″W
- Translator: 93.5 W228DG (Waverly)

Links
- Public license information: Public file; LMS
- Webcast: Listen live
- Website: wqmvradio.com

WQMV (1060 AM) is a radio station broadcasting an oldies music format. Licensed to Waverly, Tennessee, United States, the station is currently owned by DCDL Media and features live and syndicated programing relating to classic rock & roll music.

== History ==
WPHC signed on the air September 25, 1963. It was owned by the Humphreys County Broadcasting Company, a business of Robert M. McKay, Jr. and managed locally by Dean Bush. WPHC broadcast on 1540 kHz until moving to 1060 kHz in 1965.

Mid-Cumberland Communications, Inc., acquired WPHC in 1984 and sold it to the Reach Satellite Network, a religious broadcaster, in 1996; Reach immediately spun off WPHC to another religious group, Canaan Communications.

In 2003, the station was sold to the C & L Broadcasting Company of Ashland City, Tennessee. After being silent for a year, the station reemerged as WQMV in 2005. In 2006, C & L brought in DCDL Media to manage the daily operations, develop a music format and ensure coverage of the sports teams of the county's two high schools. DCDL selected a classic rock format and also made early use of streaming to carry conflicting high school sporting events.

In 2010, C & L Broadcasting made the decision to cease operational service to Humphreys County and to allow the frequency to go silent again. DCDL then entered into a licensing agreement with C & L to take over the station's operating expenses and other obligations, keeping WQMV on the air. DCDL then bought the entire station in March 2011, including its license, with DCDL officially becoming the owner on July 1, 2011.

In February 2016, DCDL filed to acquire an FM translator and relocate it to Waverly as part of the FCC's AM revitalization program. On July 4, 2016, FM translator W228DG was added, providing FM service in WQMV's coverage area of Humphreys, Houston, Benton and parts of Dickson counties.
