= WJTW =

- Bridgeport, Alabama; United States
- Frequency: 1480 kHz
- Branding: 106.1 K-Win

Programming
- Format: Classic hits
- Affiliations: WKWN, WFLI

Ownership
- Owner: Marshall M. Bandy; (Bridgeport, Inc.)

History
- First air date: 1961 (as WBTS)
- Former call signs: WBTS (1961–1998); WKEA (1998–2001); WYMR (2001–2007); WGNQ (2007–2013); WVOV (2013–2017); WDXW (2017–2019)

Technical information
- Licensing authority: FCC
- Facility ID: 57794
- Class: D
- Power: 1,000 watts day 39 watts night
- Transmitter coordinates: 34.9428°N 85.7072°W
- Translators: 95.7 W239CO (Chattanooga, TN); 106.1 W291CF (Bridgeport, AL)

Links
- Public license information: Public file; LMS
- Webcast: Listen live
- Website: WJTW Online

WJTW (1480 AM) is a radio station licensed to serve Bridgeport, Alabama, United States. The station is owned by Marshall M. Bandy, through licensee Bridgeport, Inc.

== History ==
On April 15, 1998, longtime owner of Bridgeport Broadcasting Company, the licensee for this station, then known as WBTS, Roy C. McCloud died. In June 1998, control of the company passed involuntarily to Remal J. McCloud and Darren W. McCloud, the joint executors of his estate. The Federal Communications Commission approved the transfer on July 9, 1998, and the transaction was formally consummated on August 10, 1998. Later that year in Atlanta, Georgia, they used the WBTS callsign until August 2010.

In July 1998, KEA Radio Inc. (Ronald H. Livengood, president) reached an agreement to acquire WBTS from Remal J. McCloud and Darren W. McCloud. The station sold for a reported $5,000. The deal was approved by the FCC on October 20, 1998, and the transaction was consummated on November 2, 1998. Under the new ownership, this station changed its call letters to WKEA on November 13, 1998.

The WKEA call letters were chosen to match co-owned WKEA-FM in nearby Scottsboro, Alabama. In 2001, in preparation for the sale of this AM station, WKEA's owners petitioned the FCC for new call letters and the station was assigned WYMR on February 13, 2001.

In December 2001, Dade County Broadcasting (Evan E. Stone, president) reached an agreement to purchase WYMR from KEA Radio Inc. (Ronald Livengood, president) for a reported sale price of $36,000. The deal was approved by the FCC on January 18, 2002, and the transaction was consummated on January 31, 2002. At the time of the sale, the station broadcast an adult standards music format.

In April 2003, Stone Collins Communications Inc. (William J. Lord, VP) reached an agreement to purchase WYMR from Dade County Broadcasting Inc. (Evan E. Stone, president/director) for a reported sale price of $45,000. The deal was approved by the FCC on July 31, 2003, but the transaction was never consummated, and the station's license remained with Dade County Broadcasting.

In June 2005, MG Media Inc. (Marvin Glass, owner) reached an agreement to purchase WYMR from Dade County Broadcasting Inc. The deal was approved by the FCC on September 23, 2005, and the transaction was consummated on September 29, 2005.

The station was assigned the WGNQ call letters by the FCC on November 13, 2007.

In April 2013, MG Media sold WGNQ to Anthony Bono's Partners Media Investments LLC for $55,000. The sale was consummated on August 2, 2013.

The station was assigned the WVOV call letters by the FCC on September 7, 2013.

On May 1, 2017, WVOV went silent. The station changed its call sign to WDXW on November 13, 2017, and then to WJTW on September 2, 2019. Is back on the air.

Effective August 31, 2020, Partners Media Investments sold WJTW and its translator to Bridgeport, Inc. for $30,000.

On January 13, 2021, WJTW changed their format from adult contemporary to a hybrid classic country/southern gospel format, still under the "Mix 106.1/95.7" branding.

On January 1, 2022, WJTW changed their format from a hybrid classic country/southern gospel format to a 1970s/1980s based classic hits format as "106.1 The Eagle".

WJTW is an affiliate of the NFL Tennessee Titans, University of Tennessee Football & Basketball, and the MLB Atlanta Braves.

== Previous logo ==
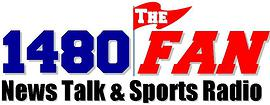
