= Mike Keith (sportscaster) =

American sportscaster (born 1967)

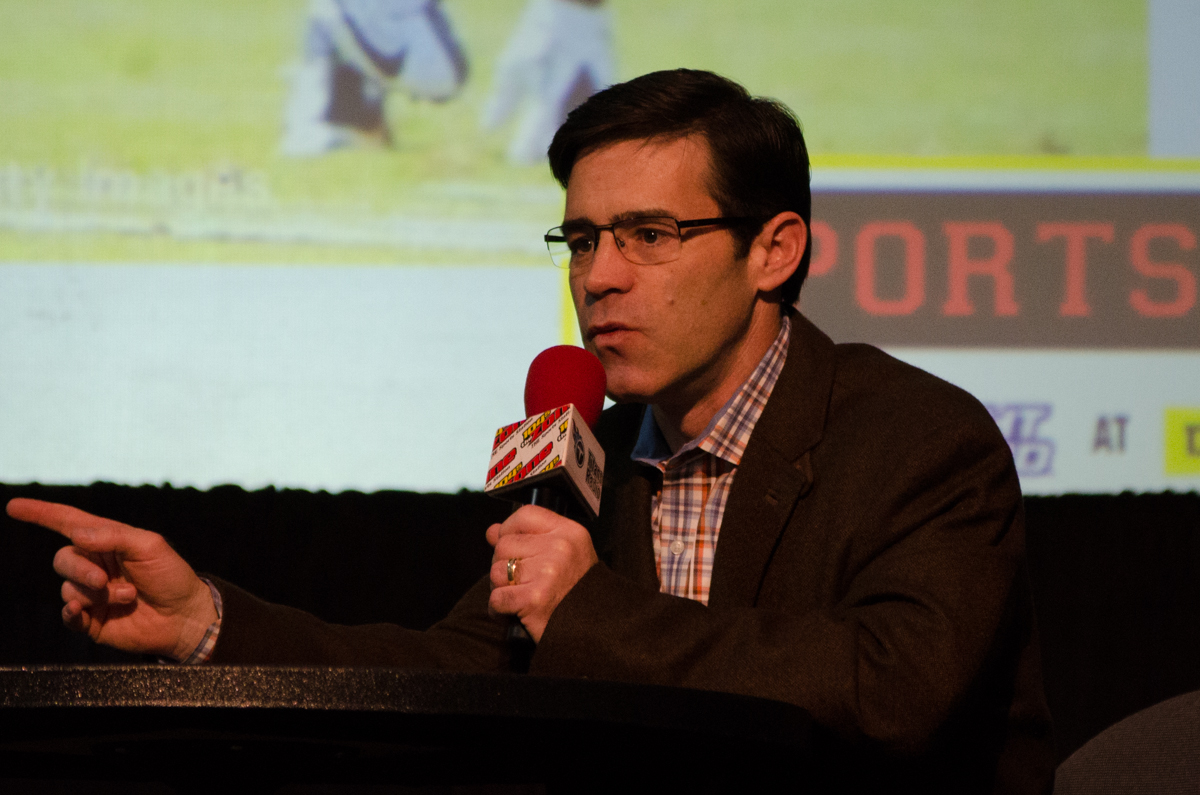
- Keith in 2013
- Born: September 11, 1967 (age 59)
- Education: University of Tennessee
- Occupation: Sportscaster
- Years active: 1984–current
- Awards: Tennessee Sports Hall of Fame (2021); Tennessee Radio Hall of Fame (2020); Tennessee's Sportscaster of the Year, 11-times (2000, 2001, 2003, 2005, 2006, 2007, 2008, 2009, 2010, 2012, 2013, 2023); Edward R. Murrow Award for nationwide excellence in sports reporting (1997)
- Sports commentary career
- Teams: Tennessee Volunteers (1987–1998, 2025–present); Tennessee Titans (1999–2024)
- Genre: Play-by-play

Mike Keith (born September 11, 1967) is the radio play-by-play voice of the University of Tennessee Tennessee Volunteers football team.

== Early life ==
Keith's broadcasting ambitions began at age seven when his father began taking him to University of Tennessee football and basketball games. While attending elementary school in Chattanooga, Tennessee, Keith was part of a reading program where he participated in a mock newscast. In 1977, his family moved to Franklin, Tennessee, a Nashville suburb. Keith attended high school at Battle Ground Academy in Franklin. He played a wide receiver, punter, and defensive back as a member of the school's football team.

== Broadcasting career ==
After high school, Keith attended the University of Tennessee, where he began his broadcasting career as a student and continued after completing school. From 1987 to 1998, Keith worked for John Ward with the Vol Radio Network, a network that covers University of Tennessee athletics. From 1989 to 1998, Keith hosted daily sports talk shows on WIVK, a Knoxville, Tennessee radio station, and he covered University of Tennessee sports in Knoxville for WIVK-FM radio and WBIR-TV television.

In 1996, Bud Adams, the owner of the National Football League's Houston Oilers announced he would move his team to Nashville. That same year, while the team was in still in Houston, Keith began hosting a pre-game show for Tennessee stations that carried the Oilers games. He served as the network's scoreboard host in 1997 before moving into the booth as color analyst in 1998. In 1999, Keith took over the play-by-play duties.

As the voice of the Titans, Keith has consistently announced every Titans touchdown by bellowing, "Touchdowwwwn, Titans!" Keith's most famous call is that of the Music City Miracle, near the end of his first season as play-by-play announcer. The unbelievable play resulted in a last-minute Titans win that kept them alive in the 1999-2000 NFL Playoffs and eventually led the team to Super Bowl XXXIV.

Since 1999, Keith has won the Tennessee Sportscaster of the Year Award 12 times. He hosted the television show Titans All Access, in addition to hosting daily Titans updates on Titans Radio, and hosting the weekly Mike Vrabel Show, a radio show which featured Mike Vrabel as co-host.

In 2025, Keith returned to the Vols as their play-by-play announcer, replacing Bob Kessling. Like Ward, Keith begins every Tennessee football game by saying, "It's football time in Tennessee!" During home games at Neyland Stadium, Keith usually times himself to say it as the Vols run through the "Power T." As he did with the Titans, Keith usually calls a Vols sack by bellowing, "SAAAAACK!"

== Personal life ==
Keith and his wife, Michelle, have two children. Keith was also the play-by-play radio voice of the Arena Football League's Nashville Kats. He also worked as the public address announcer for Battle Ground Academy’s home football games. Keith's father, Bill, was president of FirstExpress, a truckload carrier company based in Nashville.
