= EPB =

Electricity and telecommunications company in Chattanooga, Tennessee

- Type: Public utility
- Industry: Electricity; Telecommunications
- Predecessor: Chattanooga Electric Power Board
- Founded: 1935
- Headquarters: Chattanooga, Tennessee, United States
- Area served: Southeastern Tennessee, Chattanooga, North Georgia
- Key people: David Wade, CEO
- Services: Electricity, Internet, Telecommunications, Cable TV services
- Website: https://epb.com/

EPB of Chattanooga, formerly known as the Electric Power Board of Chattanooga, is an American electric power distribution and telecommunication company owned by the city of Chattanooga, Tennessee. EPB serves nearly 180,000 homes and businesses in a 600-square mile area in the greater Chattanooga area and Hamilton County. In 2010, EPB was the first company in the United States to offer 1 Gbit/s high-speed internet over a fiber optic network, over 200 times faster than the national average. As a result, Chattanooga has been called "Gig City" and held up as a national model for deploying the world's fastest internet and the most advanced Smart Grid electric distribution system in the United States. On October 15, 2015, Chattanooga implemented the world's first community-wide 10-gig Internet service.

In 1935, an act of the Tennessee Legislature established EPB as an independent board of the City of Chattanooga to provide electric power to the Greater Chattanooga area. EPB began serving their customers in 1939.

== History ==
=== 1930s ===
- 1935: EPB was founded as the Electric Power Board, a public distributor of TVA electricity to residents of Chattanooga after a public vote in favor of funding bonds to create public power.
- 1939: EPB paid $10.85 million for its portion of the TEPCO system, acquiring 42,000 customers in the process. The deal makes EPB the prominent electricity provider in the Greater Chattanooga area.

=== 1990s ===
- 1999: EPB celebrated its 60th anniversary by introducing new branding meant to symbolize the company's innovation, strength, and responsiveness. The new brand image allowed EPB to expand into various non-power-related businesses, including telecommunications and internet services.

=== 2000s ===
- 2000: Over a 3-year period, EPB launched its telecommunication services under the name “EPB Telecom”, providing local businesses with affordable, reliable, all-fiber high-speed internet services.
- 2008: EPB secured a bond to begin the construction of the Smart Grid, a project backed by more than 10 years of research and development.

=== 2010s ===
- 2012: EPB completed their Smart Grid construction, one of the first and largest in the United States.
- 2015: EPB made its 10-gigabit internet service available to all residential and commercial customers within their 600 square mile service area, allowing them to access internet speeds roughly 1,000 times higher than the national average. Being the first internet service of its kind and the fastest broadband internet connection in the world, both EPB and the city of Chattanooga, grew in global recognition and media attention.

=== 2020s ===
- 2022: EPB announced 25-gigabit internet service available city-wide.

== Expansions ==
EPB is providing its gigabit internet service in Chattanooga Airport. They set up a demonstration area in the former gift shop. EPB also provides free high-speed Wi-Fi in Miller Plaza. EPB is one of the largest providers of electric power in the US. EPB has petitioned the FCC to allow them to deliver internet to communities outside of the 600 square mile area that they service. Nineteen states in the US have laws that make it difficult or impossible for utility companies to deliver internet outside of the area that they service.

=== Fiber optics, Smart Grid, and smart city ===
In February 2008, the EPB Board of Directors approved a plan to construct a Smart Grid with 100% fiber-optic network as its backbone. It was also expected to be completely automated and a self-healing smart grid electrical distribution system.

In September 2010, EPB completed the construction of a 9,000-mile community-wide, 100% fiber optic network. As a result, EPB became the first connectivity provider in the United States to offer one gigabit-per-second (1,000 Mbit/s) internet speed to more than 175,000 homes and businesses. This has attracted worldwide attention and earned Chattanooga the nickname "Gig City."

The development of Chattanooga's Smart Grid completed in April 2012 with the installation of more than 200,000 sensors and smart devices, including the deployment of about 1,200 automated smart switches and other advanced power management equipment throughout the system. The initial build-out was completed in four years instead of the expected ten years.

In September 2013, EPB increased its starting speed to 100 Mbit/s with no additional charge to current customers. In 2019, EPB raised its starting speed to 300 Mbit/s.

In October 2014, EPB established a partnership with the U.S. Department of Energy and Oak Ridge National Laboratory to use Chattanooga's smart grid to test and develop new energy technologies.

In October 2018, EPB joined with other community partners in the launch of the Chattanooga Smart Cities Community Collaborative, a joint effort to utilize the Chattanooga area's smart city infrastructure and other expertise and assets in the service of smart city research, including the establishment of a mile-long Smart City Testbed Corridor by the University of Tennessee at Chattanooga's Center for Urban Informatics and Progress. As a result of research efforts completed by members of the Chattanooga Smart Cities Collaborative, Chattanooga was named an IDC Smart City in 2020 for a project to predict hotspots for traffic accidents and address them. U.S. Ignite, a national innovation group led by the NSF and the OSTP, also recognized Chattanooga with a Smart 50 Award in 2019.

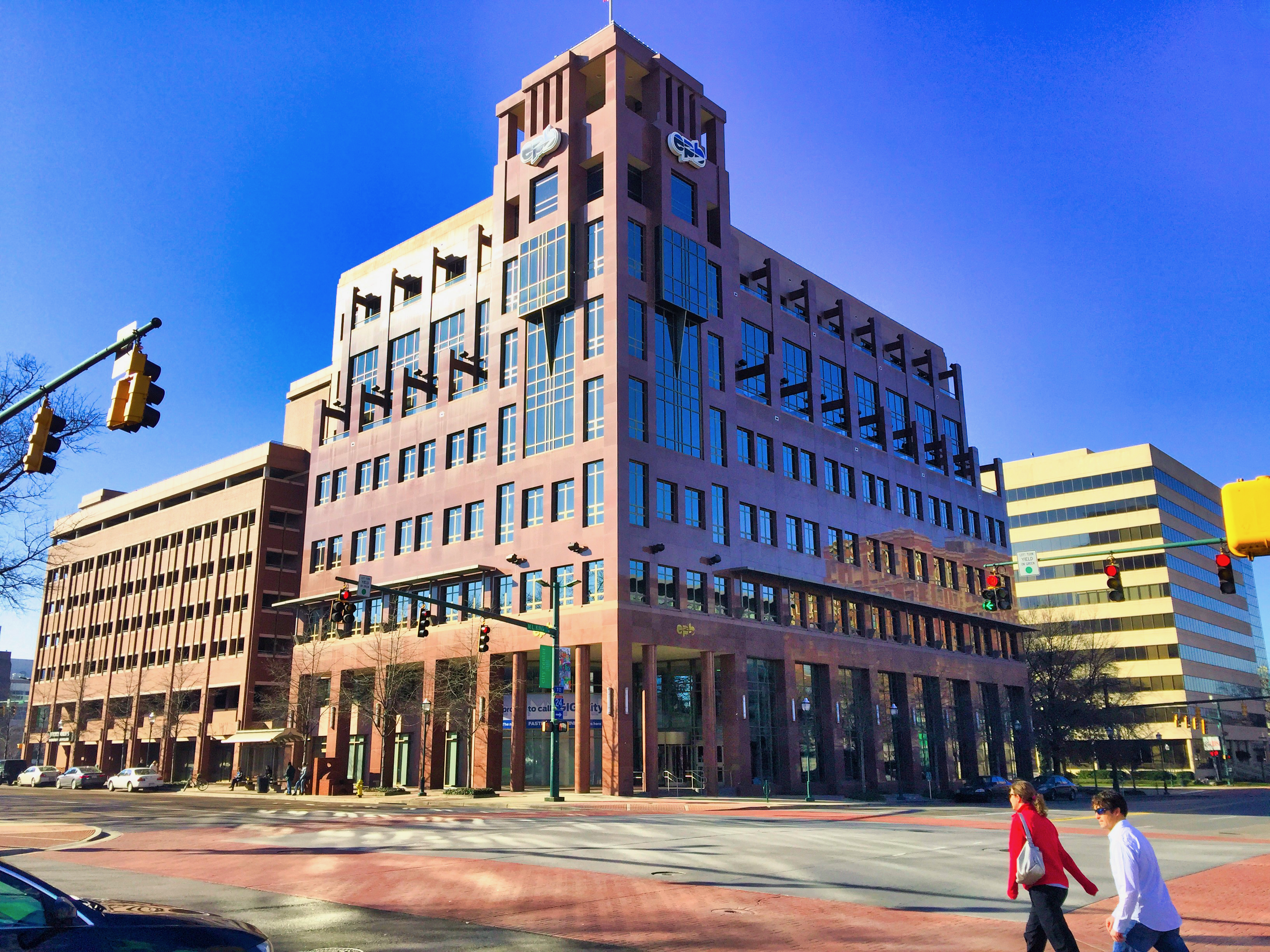
EPB headquarters in Chattanooga pictured on Jan. 17, 2015

== Community impact ==
In July 2020, EPB and its community partners announced HCS EdConnect, a program to provide the families of all economically challenged K–12 students with high-speed internet and a wireless router at no charge. The program was designed to ensure internet access for all K–12 students in need for at least ten years, with plans to raise the funding necessary to continue the program indefinitely.

In January 2021, an independent study conducted by Bento Lobo, Ph.D. of the University of Tennessee at Chattanooga, documented $2.69 billion in benefits to the community during the first ten years after EPB built the community-wide fiber optic network and advanced smart grid. According to the study, the implementation of EPB's fiber optic system has helped generate an estimated 9,516 jobs and $244 million in business ventures using the fiber optic network."

== Environmental efforts ==
According to Dr. Bento Lobo's study in 2021, the construction of Chattanooga's smart grid helped avoid 7,900 tons of CO_{2} emissions from 2014 to 2020 by allowing a significant reduction in road miles driven as well as enhanced power demand management and power factor improvement.

In 2015, EPB partnered with TVA and other partners to provide home energy renovations at no charge to economically challenged homeowners through what is now called the "Home Uplift" program. In April 2021, EPB and its partners announced the completion of its 400th "Home Uplift." According to third-party analysis, each of the 400 homes saves 5,206 kWh on average each year which equates to more than $208,000 in total savings to customers and the avoidance of 1,472 metric tons of carbon emissions.

In July 2017, EPB completed the construction of Solar Share, Chattanooga's first and only community solar installation. The facility consists of 4,408 solar panels that can generate 1.3 megawatts of solar power, which is enough to meet the average energy needs of 130 homes.

In October 2019, EPB's Solar Share community solar installation powered the 3rd International Placemaking Week Conference, making it Chattanooga's first conference with net-zero carbon.

In November 2019, EPB earned the Leadership in Energy and Environmental Design (LEED) certification at the Gold level for an existing building. The certification reflects EPB's success in dramatically reducing its environmental impact through energy efficiency, reduced water use, diverting waste from landfills through composting and recycling, and other measures.

== Community emergency support ==
As part of the government-owned infrastructure in Chattanooga, EPB functions as one of the community's first responders to ensure uninterrupted fiber optic and electric power service in the event of natural disasters.

=== 2020 Easter tornado outbreak ===
On April 12, 2020, the Easter tornado outbreak that took place in the Chattanooga area disrupted the electric and fiber optic grids. More than 106,000 EPB customers lost power initially, with 44,000 regaining power within hours from Chattanooga's smart grid automatic processing. EPB leveraged mutual aid agreements to bring more than 1,500 utility workers from eight states to restore services for the remaining affected customers. In addition to the utility crews, EPB office employees also assisted by volunteering to distribute food and protective gear and coordinate the staging of reconstruction materials.

=== COVID-19 response ===
When COVID-19 began in 2020, EPB provided community support through in-kind services and financial support, suspending disconnections and waiving late fees to ensure their customers could maintain connectivity, in addition to installing more than 130 Wi-Fi hotspots in publicly accessible areas and housing developments. In July 2020, EPB joined Hamilton County Schools in launching HCS Ed Connect to provide home-based internet to all K-12 students and their families at no charge. Although HCS EdConnect ensured that students could continue their studies remotely during the COVID-19 pandemic was the initial impetus for the program, it originally was designed to remain available to eligible families indefinitely so that it could serve as a lasting solution for bridging the digital divide for students in Hamilton County.

EPB engaged TVA in matching donations to United Way of Greater Chattanooga's Restore Hope Fund to support individuals and families experiencing financial strain due to COVID-19, resulting in a total contribution of more than $785,000.

In November 2020, EPB donated 5,000 face coverings to help local students and teachers stay safe amidst the COVID-19 pandemic. The donation of the face coverings benefitted five schools located in Hamilton County and was initiated by an Economic Recovery Group commissioned by Tennessee state Governor, Bill Lee.

=== Awards and recognition ===
- In January 2016, Chattanooga's EPB-operated smart grid became the first major power distribution system to earn Performance Excellence in Electricity Renewal (PEER) certification. This achievement followed a year-long assessment of Chattanooga's smart grid that analyzed system performance and reliability, quality of service, a customer contribution, energy efficiency, and environmental sustainability.
- In July 2018, the Tennessee Department of Environment and Conservation and Governor Bill Haslam recognized EPB as a Pursuit of Excellence Winner for its leadership in environmental stewardship by reducing carbon emissions by 3,340 metric tons and recycling more than 4,600 tons of materials.

== See also ==
- Cities with municipal wireless networks
