= WAKI =

- McMinnville, Tennessee; United States
- Frequency: 1230 kHz
- Branding: 92.1 The One

Programming
- Format: Contemporary Christian

Ownership
- Owner: Main Street Media, LLC
- Sister stations: WBMC, WOWC, WTRZ

History
- First air date: 1947

Technical information
- Licensing authority: FCC
- Facility ID: 17758
- Class: C
- Power: 620 watts day; 1,000 watts night
- Transmitter coordinates: 35°40′0.30″N 85°46′34.90″W
- Translator: 92.1 W221ED (McMinnville)

Links
- Public license information: Public file; LMS
- Webcast: Listen Live
- Website: 921theone.com

WAKI (1230 AM) is a radio station licensed to McMinnville, Tennessee, United States. The station is owned by Main Street Media, LLC.

On October 13, 2025, WAKI changed their format from sports to contemporary Christian, branded as "92.1 The One".
