= Tom Sullivan (radio and television personality) =

American personality

- Born: Atlanta
- Occupation(s): Television and radio personality

Tom Sullivan is an Atlanta, Georgia radio and television personality.

== Biography ==
Sullivan has been in radio since his senior year in high school, and with WSTR Star94 since graduation.

In October 2007 he became the co-host along with Holly Firfer of Atlanta and Company on 11 Alive NBC and broadcast on cable to Jamaica, Costa Rica and North Carolina.

An Atlanta native, Sullivan gave Ryan Seacrest his first gig in radio. Seacrest interned with Sullivan for a year, learning all aspects of radio broadcasting.

In his tenure as the "out there" guy on Star 94's Steve & Vikki Morning Show, Sullivan has performed over 500 individual stunts including wrapping himself in bubble wrap and being rolled down the stairs at Underground Atlanta; showering in a stranger's house; eating off a stranger's plate at a Waffle House; and camping on the roof of Lenox Square Mall under The Great Tree during the 2000 presidential election vote-counting controversy. This stunt was covered nationally by CNN.

== Television appearances ==
Sullivan was co-star on the GPB television show Chick In A Chair. He was selected as a semi finalist for the Oprah Winfrey reality show The Big Give on ABC television. He appeared on the season finale of American Gladiators on NBC and "Live" with Kelly Ripa. Sullivan was invited by Harpo studios to attend the farewell Oprah Winfrey show.

Sullivan is a five-time semi-finalist for Survivor.

== Community ==
Sullivan the first civilian ever to host a "Change of Command" ceremony from one four-star General to the next at Fort McPherson in one of the military's most revered traditions. Sullivan was invited back again 4 years later as host and emcee.

Sullivan works with several charities and helped raise more than $5,000,000 for Children's Healthcare of Atlanta. He is an Eagle Scout.

== See also ==
- WXIA-TV personalities
