= Horseleg Mountain =

Mountain in Georgia, United States

Coordinates: 34.2298165°N 85.2446750°W

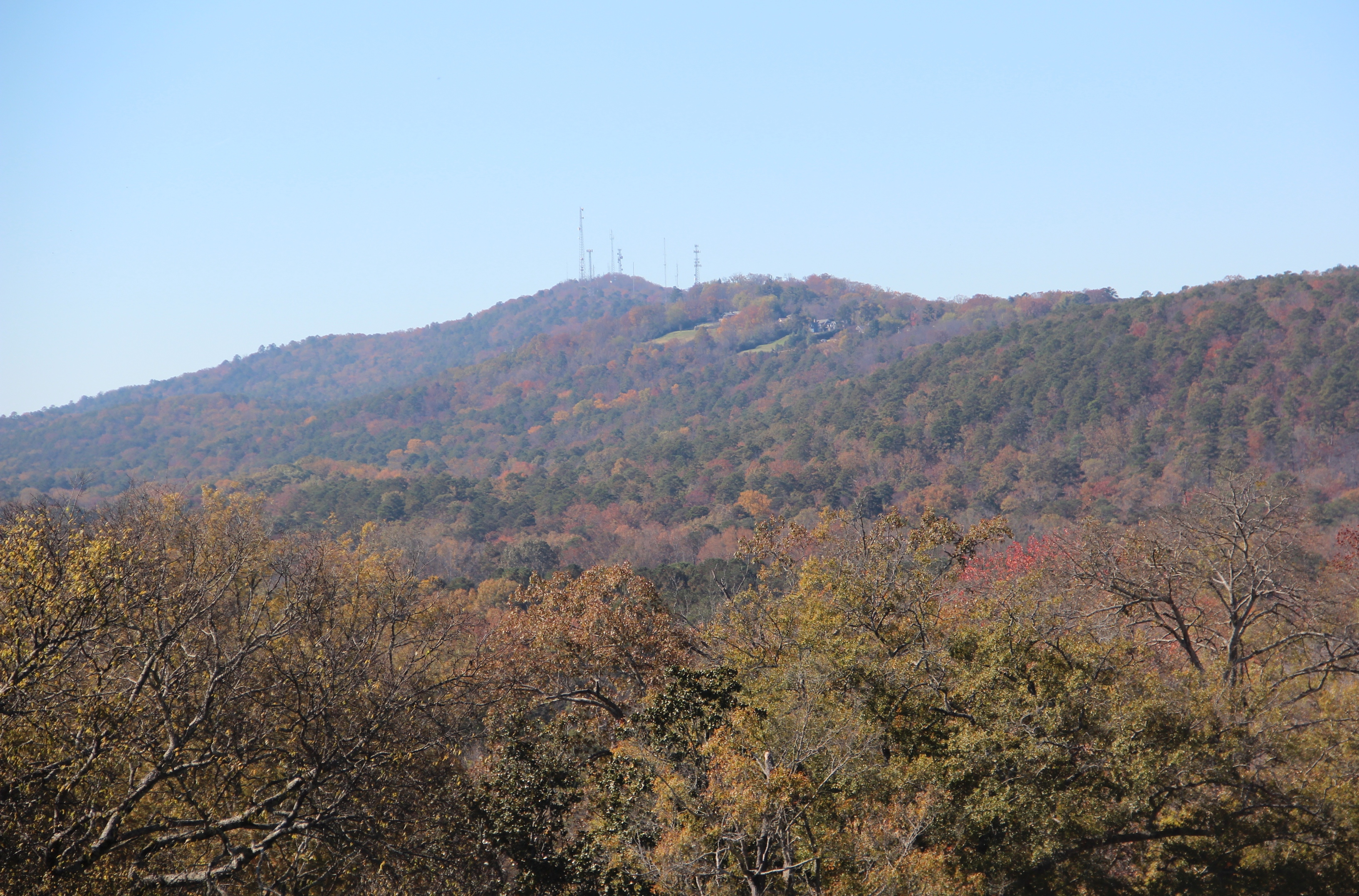
Horseleg Mountain viewed from Myrtle Hill Cemetery

Horseleg Mountain is a summit in Floyd County, Georgia, in the United States. With an elevation of 1,322 feet (403 m), Horseleg Mountain is the 735th highest summit in the state of Georgia.

Horseleg Mountain is said to be shaped like the leg of a horse, hence the name.
