= List of television stations in Tennessee =

This is a list of broadcast television stations that are licensed in the U.S. state of Tennessee.

== Full-power ==
- Stations are arranged by media market served and channel position.

Full-power television stations in Tennessee
Media market	Station	Channel	Primary affiliation(s)	Notes	Refs
Chattanooga	WRCB	3	NBC		
Chattanooga	WTVC	9	ABC, Fox on 9.2		
Chattanooga	WDEF-TV	12	CBS		
Chattanooga	WTCI	45	PBS		
Chattanooga	WFLI-TV	53	The CW, MyNetworkTV on 53.2	(Note: Licensed to Cleveland, Tennessee.)	
Chattanooga	WDSI-TV	61	True Crime Network		
Jackson	WBBJ-TV	7	ABC, CBS on 7.3		
Jackson	WLJT	11	PBS	(Note: Licensed to Lexington, Tennessee.)	
Jackson	WJKT	16	Fox		
Johnson City–Kingsport	WETP-TV	2	PBS	(Note: Licensed to Sneedville, Tennessee.) (Note: Satellite of WKOP-TV.)	
Johnson City–Kingsport	WJHL-TV	11	CBS, ABC on 11.2		
Johnson City–Kingsport	WKPT-TV	19	Cozi TV		
Johnson City–Kingsport	WEMT	39	Fox	(Note: Licensed to Greeneville, Tennessee.)	
Knoxville	WATE-TV	6	ABC		
Knoxville	WKNX-TV	7	Independent		
Knoxville	WVLT-TV	8	CBS, MyNetworkTV on 8.2		
Knoxville	WBIR-TV	10	NBC		
Knoxville	WKOP-TV	15	PBS		
Knoxville	WBXX-TV	20	The CW	(Note: Licensed to Crossville, Tennessee.)	
Knoxville	WTNZ	43	Fox		
Knoxville	WVLR	48	CTN	(Note: Licensed to Tazewell, Tennessee.)	
Knoxville	WPXK-TV	54	Ion Television	(Note: Licensed to Jellico, Tennessee.)	
Memphis	WREG-TV	3	CBS		
Memphis	WMC-TV	5	NBC		
Memphis	WKNO	10	PBS		
Memphis	WHBQ-TV	13	Fox		
Memphis	WTWV	23	Religious independent		
Memphis	WATN-TV	24	ABC		
Memphis	WLMT	30	The CW		
Memphis	WPXX-TV	50	Ion Television		
Nashville	WKRN-TV	2	ABC		
Nashville	WSMV-TV	4	NBC		
Nashville	WTVF	5	CBS		
Nashville	WNPT	8	PBS		
Nashville	WZTV	17	Fox, The CW on 17.2		
Nashville	WCTE	22	PBS	(Note: Licensed to Cookeville, Tennessee.)	
Nashville	WNPX-TV	28	Ion Television	(Note: Licensed to Franklin, Tennessee.)	
Nashville	WUXP-TV	30	MyNetworkTV		
Nashville	WHTN	39	CTN	(Note: Licensed to Murfreesboro, Tennessee.)	
Nashville	WJFB	44	MeTV	(Note: Licensed to Lebanon, Tennessee.)	
Nashville	WPGD-TV	50	TBN	(Note: Licensed to Hendersonville, Tennessee.)	
Nashville	WNAB	58	Roar		

== Low-power ==
Low-power television stations in Tennessee
Media market	Station	Channel	Network	Notes	Refs
Chattanooga	WOOT-LD	6	Various		
Chattanooga	WCTD-LD	22	[Blank]	(Note: Licensed to Ducktown, Tennessee.)	
Chattanooga	WDDA-LD	24	Silent		
Chattanooga	W26ET-D	26	3ABN		
Chattanooga	WTNB-CD	27	CTN		
Chattanooga	W11DM-D	30	3ABN	(Note: Licensed to Collegedale, Tennessee.)	
Chattanooga	WCNT-LP	36	3ABN		
Chattanooga	WYHB-CD	39	Various		
Chattanooga	WDNN-CD	43	Heartland	(Note: Licensed to Dalton, Georgia.)	
Chattanooga	WTVL-CD	49	Telemundo		
Jackson	W12DR-D	17	Silent, QVC on 17.2		
Jackson	W32EV-D	18	Independent	(Note: Licensed to Adamsville, Tennessee.)	
Jackson	W18EW-D	18	Silent		
Jackson	WYJJ-LD	27	Various		
Jackson	WNBJ-LD	39	NBC, The CW on 39.2, MyNetworkTV on 39.3		
Johnson City–Kingsport	WAPK-CD	36	MeTV		
Knoxville	WWWB-LD	3	Silent	(Note: Licensed to Clarkrange, Tennessee.)	
Knoxville	WJDP-LD	11	IBN Television	(Note: Licensed to Pigeon Forge, Tennessee.)	
Knoxville	W14CX-D	14	3ABN		
Knoxville	WDTT-LD	24	Daystar		
Knoxville	W45DF-D	30	HSN		
Knoxville	WKXT-LD	61	Various		
Memphis	WNBA-LD	2	Dabl		
Memphis	WPGF-LD	6	Audio-only on 87.7 FM		
Memphis	WPED-LD	19	Various		
Memphis	WFBI-LD	33	Religious independent		
Memphis	WQEK-LD	36	Various		
Memphis	W15EA-D	42	3ABN		
Memphis	WWWN-LD	46	Estrella TV		
Memphis	WQEO-LD	49	Various		
Memphis	WDNM-LD	59	Daystar		
Nashville	WRTN-LD	6	Daystar	(Note: Licensed to Alexandria, Tennessee.)	
Nashville	WNSH-LD	9	The Country Network		
Nashville	WDHC-LD	11	The Family Channel	(Note: Licensed to Dickson–Nashville, Tennessee.)	
Nashville	WIIW-LD	14	Various		
Nashville	WCKV-LD	22	Right Now TV	(Note: Licensed to Clarksville, Tennessee.)	
Nashville	WNPX-LD	24	Daystar		
Nashville	WNTU-LD	26	Daystar		
Nashville	WTNX-LD	29	Telemundo		
Nashville	WJDE-CD	31	Religious independent		
Nashville	WJNK-LD	34	TBN		
Nashville	WCTZ-LD	35	Various	(Note: Nominally licensed to Bowling Green, Kentucky.)	
Nashville	WKUW-LD	40	Various	(Note: Licensed to White House, Tennessee.)	
Nashville	WLLC-LD	42	Univision, UniMás on 42.2		

== Translators ==
Television station translators in Tennessee
Media market	Station	Channel	Translating	Notes	Refs
Chattanooga	WPDP-CD	25	WTVC		
Johnson City–Kingsport	WOPI-CD	19	WKPT-TV		
Johnson City–Kingsport	WKPT-CD	19	WKPT-TV		
Johnson City–Kingsport	WKIN-CD	36	WAPK-CD		
Johnson City–Kingsport	WKPZ-CD	36	WAPK-CD		
Knoxville	WJZC-LP	28	WEZK-LD	(Note: Licensed to Sevierville, Tennessee.)	
Knoxville	WEZK-LD	28	WLFG		
Memphis	WDDY-LD	5	WMC-TV	(Note: Licensed to Jackson, Tennessee.)	
Memphis	WANF-LD	5	WMC-TV	(Note: Licensed to Dyersburg, Tennessee.)	
Nashville	W14EE-D	29; 4.10	WTNX-LD; WSMV-TV	(Note: Licensed to Algood, Tennessee.)	
Nashville	WFET-LD	29; 4.10	WTNX-LD; WSMV-TV	(Note: Licensed to Lewisburg, Tennessee.)	
Nashville	W35DZ-D	35	WCTE		

== Defunct ==
- WCPT-TV Crossville (1976–1983)
- WEEE-LP Knoxville (1997–2021)
- WETV-CD Murfreesboro (1982–2021)
- WMCV Nashville (1968–1971)

== See also ==
- Tennessee § Media

== Bibliography ==
- "United States TV Stations: Tennessee", Yearbook of Radio and Television, New York: Radio Television Daily, 1964, OCLC 7469377 – via Internet Archive
