= Mike Manuel =

American singer-songwriter

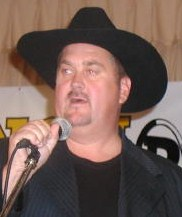
- Mike Performing onstage at the ICGMA Awards

Background information
- Origin: Tennessee, US
- Genres: Gospel music, country, Christian music
- Occupations: Christian music singer, songwriter
- Instrument: Guitar
- Years active: 1972–present
- Label: Jordan Records

Mike Manuel is a Christian country music artist based out of Nashville, Tennessee.

== Singing career ==
Mike traveled with his brothers Greg and Mark as the Manuel Family Band, which had three single radio releases that climbed to the Singing News top forty. They were also charted as number one in the Christian Country and Country Gospel markets. The brothers traveled and sang their original Inspirational Country music in hundreds of churches and concert halls across the United States and in several foreign countries.

In 1996, Mike Manuel relocated his family to Nashville and began a full-time solo career with a progressive country sound and emphasis. Manuel had a succession of fifteen number one radio singles and over twenty awards from various music organizations, including the Country Gospel Music Association 1998 & 1999 National Entertainer of the Year, 1998 National Songwriter of the Year, and 1999 CCMA Male Vocalist of the year. He has also performed at the Inspirational Country Music Awards along with many other well-known Country artists such as Wynonna Judd, Josh Turner, and Diamond Rio, where he won the 2006 Songwriter of the Year award. Manuel is a board member of the International Country Gospel Music Association.

== Federal lawsuit ==
On May 30, 2008, Manuel and his brothers Greg and Mark Manuel were sued in federal court for securities fraud. The lawsuit accused them of setting up a Ponzi scheme to trick investors, including Debbie Smith, a former Christian singer, into giving them money with the promises of large returns and misrepresenting themselves as licensed investment professionals. Mark and Greg Manuel are listed as officers of MPire Holdings, LLC (a.k.a. MRI Holdings). Plaintiffs Jerry and Deborah Smith alleged that the company had been set up as a legal front. On December 23, 2009, the Manuel brothers filed a motion pro se in Federal Court asking for the charges to be dismissed, but the motion was denied by a judge. According to a report by WSMV-TV of Nashville, all three Manuel brothers were disassociating themselves from their legal identities and declaring themselves a "Sovereign Nation". On September 26, 2011, a default judgment in the amount of $187,000 was entered against Mike Manuel, Greg Manuel, and Mark Manuel.
