= Q-Less (game) =

Solo word game played with letter dice

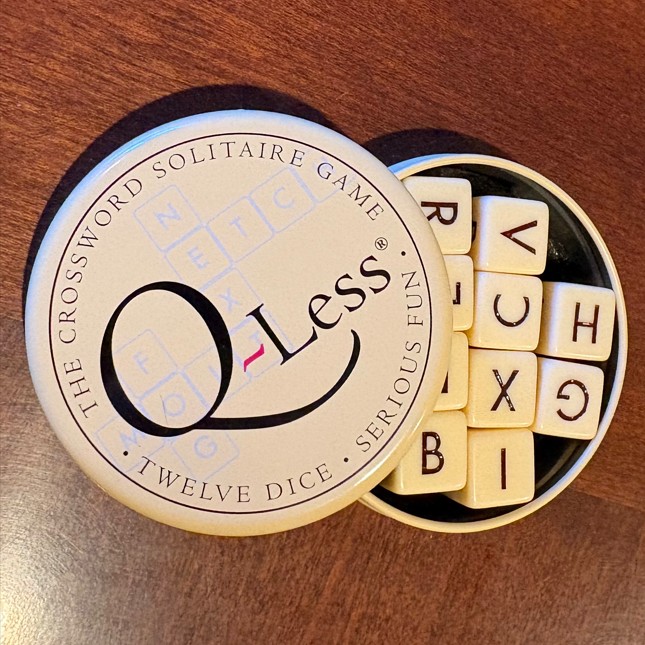
- Components of Q-Less
- Designers: Tom Sturdevant
- Players: 1
- Website: https://qlessgame.com/

Q-Less is a single-player word puzzle game in which the player rolls 12 dice and uses the resulting letters to form connected words in a crossword-style arrangement. It was invented by game designer Tom Sturdevant. Its name comes from the omission of the letter Q from the dice.

== Gameplay ==
According to the game's official rules, the player rolls the dice and attempts to use all 12 letters to make words that connect. Words must be at least three letters long, proper nouns and names are not allowed, and there is no time limit or scoring. Most rolls can be solved, but not all; the player must roll again if no solution can be found.

== History ==
In an interview, inventor Tom Sturdevant said the idea for a solitaire word game played with dice came to him during a road trip in the early 2000s. He began prototyping the game by using press-on letters on blank dice. To make the gameplay smoother, the letter Q was removed, which also informed the game's name. The game was released in 2018.

== Reception ==
Writing for Geeks Under Grace, Spencer Patterson described Q-Less as an "enjoyable challenge" and recommended it as a portable word puzzle. Cathy Duffy Reviews described the game as a simple activity that reinforces spelling and vocabulary skills. The game and its inventor have been featured in local television coverage, including a WSMV segment demonstrating how to play the game. Sturdevant has also been interviewed on the board game podcast Thespokentoken.
