= WNAB =

Television station in Nashville, Tennessee

ATSC 3.0 station
- Nashville, Tennessee; United States
- Channels: Digital: 30 (UHF); Virtual: 58

Programming
- Affiliations: 58.1: Roar; 58.2: The Nest; 58.3: Charge!

Ownership
- Owner: Tennessee Broadcasting; (Nashville License Holdings, L.L.C.)
- Operator: Sinclair Broadcast Group
- Sister stations: WUXP-TV, WZTV

History
- Founded: May 19, 1987
- First air date: November 29, 1995
- Former channel numbers: Analog: 58 (UHF, 1995–2009); Digital: 23 (UHF, 2001–2019)
- Former affiliations: The WB (1995–2006); The CW (2006–2021); Dabl (2021–2025)

Technical information
- Licensing authority: FCC
- Facility ID: 73310
- ERP: 510 kW
- HAAT: 411 m (1,348 ft)
- Transmitter coordinates: 36°15′49.8″N 86°47′38.9″W

Links
- Public license information: Public file; LMS

WNAB (channel 58) is a television station in Nashville, Tennessee, United States, airing programming from the digital multicast network Roar. It is owned by Tennessee Broadcasting and operated by Sinclair Broadcast Group alongside WZTV (channel 17), an affiliate of Fox and The CW, and WUXP-TV (channel 30), an independent station with MyNetworkTV. The three stations share studios on Mainstream Drive along the Cumberland River; WNAB's transmitter is located along I-24 in Whites Creek.

== History ==
=== As a WB affiliate ===
In 1987, Ruth Payne Carmen was awarded a construction permit to build a new television station on channel 58 in Nashville, which took the call letters WNAB. It would be another eight years before it began broadcasting on November 29, 1995, as the WB affiliate for the Nashville market. Prior to WNAB's debut, WB programming was only available on Nashville area cable and satellite providers either through Chicago-based national superstation WGN, or by Cookeville-based WKZX (channel 28, now Ion Television owned-and-operated station WNPX-TV), which served the eastern part of the market. Three months after launching the station, Speer Communications, a company founded by Home Shopping Network co-founder Roy Speer, acquired it; it was from Speer's studios in a former Sam's Club building on Dickerson Road in Nashville that the station had launched.

Offering five hours of live, locally produced programming each weekday, WNAB was quickly a hit among Nashville viewers, although the station lacked cable carriage in many of the suburbs. Controversial former Nashville mayor and U.S. congressman Bill Boner hosted an hour-long interview/call-in show, Prime Talk each weeknight. Its follow-up, Sports Talk, featured Nashville Banner sportswriter Greg Pogue and popular radio personality George Plaster showing highlights and taking calls about the day's sports action. On Friday nights in the fall, Sports Talk was extended by an hour and became Nashville's first television show entirely devoted to high school football scores. Since the 1996 season, at least one of Nashville's television stations has continued this tradition. Overnight, WNAB also carried MOR Music TV, a Speer-owned home shopping/music network that had moved from St. Petersburg, Florida, to the Nashville facility.

In September 1996, all live programming except Sports Talk was cancelled (partly due to budget constraints, and also due to The WB expanding its prime time lineup to additional nights outside of the initial Sunday and Wednesday slots). Plaster left Sports Talk; it was rebranded as Sports Plus and featured news and weather segments in addition to its sports content before being cancelled in 1998. WNAB also aired several Nashville Predators games when the NHL team made its debut during the 1998–99 season, and split time as the television flagship alongside regional cable sports network Fox Sports South (now FanDuel Sports Network South) until the end of the 1999–2000 season.

Speer Communications had planned to use WNAB and its Dickerson Road facility as a base of operations for Tennessee Now, a 24-hour cable news channel covering the entire state. However, by 1996, plans for Tennessee Now had been shelved. Speer would sell WNAB in 1998 to Tennessee Broadcasting, a subsidiary of Beverly Hills, California-based Lambert Broadcasting, LLC. Four years later, citing the downturn in the advertising market of the time and continued losses at WNAB, Lambert outsourced its advertising sales and operations to the Sinclair Broadcast Group.

On August 3, 2002, WNAB's transmitting facilities were relocated from its original Nolensville tower to its present transmitter near Whites Creek near the Interstate 24 interchange with Old Hickory Boulevard (State Highway 45).

=== As a CW/Dabl affiliate ===
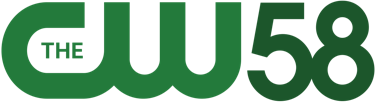
The station's CW-era logo from 2006 until 2021, before the move of that schedule to WZTV-DT2, where the numerical branding was de-emphasized.

On January 24, 2006, Time Warner and CBS Corporation announced that they would partner to launch The CW Television Network, as a replacement for The WB and UPN, initially featuring a mix of programs carried over from those two networks and newer series. Sinclair later signed WNAB as the market's affiliate of the network, as part of a wider deal to affiliate its WB affiliates and independent stations with The CW. The CW launched, with WNAB as its Nashville station, on September 18, 2006.

On July 28, 2021, the FCC issued a Forfeiture Order stemming from a lawsuit against WNAB owner Tennessee Broadcasting. The lawsuit, filed by AT&T, alleged that Tennessee Broadcasting failed to negotiate for retransmission consent in good faith for WNAB. Owners of other Sinclair-managed stations, such as Deerfield Media, were also named in the lawsuit. Tennessee Broadcasting was ordered to pay a fine of $512,228.

On September 14, 2021, Sinclair Broadcast Group announced that Nashville's CW affiliation would move from WNAB to WZTV's 17.2 subchannel beginning September 20 at 10 a.m. On that day, the main channel switched to broadcasting the Dabl digital multicast television network.

=== Switch to Roar ===
On August 1, 2025, WNAB switched affiliations to the Roar network.

== Technical information ==
=== Subchannels ===
The station's ATSC 1.0 channels are carried on the multiplexed signal of CBS affiliate WTVF:

Subchannels provided by WNAB (ATSC 1.0) on the WTVF multiplex
Subchannel	Res.	Short name	Programming	ATSC 1.0 host
58.1	480i	ROAR	Roar	WTVF
58.2	480i	Nest	The Nest	WTVF
58.3	480i	Charge!	Charge!	WTVF

=== ATSC 3.0 lighthouse service ===
Subchannels of WNAB (ATSC 3.0)
Subchannel	Res.	Short name	Programming
2.1	720p	WKRN	ABC (WKRN-TV)
4.1	1080p	WSMV	NBC (WSMV-TV)
8.11		WNPT-VC	PBS (WNPT)
17.10	1080p	T2	T2
17.11		PBTV	Pickleballtv
58.1	480i	WNAB	Roar

Subchannel broadcast with digital rights management
Subchannel streamed via the Internet

=== Analog-to-digital conversion ===
WNAB shut down its analog signal, over UHF channel 58, on February 17, 2009, which was intended to be the official date on which full-power television stations in the United States transitioned from analog to digital broadcasts under federal mandate. The deadline was moved to June 12, 2009, but the station decided to convert on the original deadline. The station's digital signal remained on its pre-transition UHF channel 23, using virtual channel 58.
