= Vanderbilt Television News Archive =

American video archive in Nashville

Coordinates: 36.14990°N 86.80023°W

- Type: Television Archive
- Established: August 5, 1968

Collection
- Items collected: News broadcasts of United States national television networks

Other information
- Director: Jim Duran
- Parent organization: Vanderbilt University
- Website: www.tvnews.vanderbilt.edu

The Vanderbilt Television News Archive, founded in August 1968, maintains a library of televised network news programs. It is a unit of the Jean and Alexander Heard Library of Vanderbilt University, a private research university located in Nashville, Tennessee. It is the world's most extensive and complete archive of television news.

== Collection ==
The archive's collection consists of more than 40,000 hours of video content, including:

- The daily news broadcasts of ABC, CBS and NBC from August 5, 1968, to the present
- A daily one-hour CNN news program beginning in 1995
- A daily one-hour Fox News program beginning in 2004
- The weeknight broadcasts of Nightline by ABC, beginning in 1988
- The networks’ televised coverage of live presidential speeches, press conferences, summit meetings, and other events
- The networks’ televised coverage of live presidential election-related events, including debates, political conventions and election night coverage

Televised coverage of major news events preserved in the archive's collection includes:

- The Vietnam War, 1968–1975
- President Richard Nixon’s 1972 trip to China
- The Watergate hearings preceding the resignation of President Richard Nixon
- The 1979-81 Iran hostage crisis
- The 1981 assassination attempt on President Ronald Reagan
- The 1986 Iran-Contra Hearings
- The 1989 San Francisco earthquake
- The 1991 Persian Gulf War
- The 1991 Clarence Thomas-Anita Hill Hearings
- The 1999 impeachment of President Bill Clinton
- The terrorist attacks of September 11, 2001
- The United States' military operations in Afghanistan from 2001-2016
- The 2003-2011 Iraq War
- The Challenger and Columbia space shuttle disasters of 1986 and 2003

== Internet database and public access ==
An online version of the archive includes abstracts and catalog records for most of the programs in the collection, which can be browsed or searched by subject, date and network. Individuals may request loans of broadcasts or selected items from the archive's collection for reference, study, classroom instruction, and research. Borrowers pay fees for the items loaned to cover the costs of providing this service. The requested items are loaned as DVDs or VHS tapes, which must be returned to the archive by the end of the loan period. Due to copyright considerations, access to streaming video is available only to a limited audience, and only for certain portions of the collection (currently CNN and NBC). Only individuals associated with sponsoring colleges and universities can view streaming video content. Visitors to the archive can view all content from the archive's collection.

== History ==
The Vanderbilt Television News Archive was founded by Paul Simpson, a Nashville businessman. The mission of the archive is to equip students and scholars with the tools necessary to both engage with and critique news coverage by making actual copies widely available. According to the official history of the archive written by Simpson, he watched a news program where Timothy Leary recommended that young Americans find themselves by freeing their mind and experimenting with LSD. Leary's comment shocked and appalled Simpson. After watching the program, Simpson wanted to watch the program again to confirm what he had heard. It was through his attempts to locate a recording of the news program that he discovered that news programs were not being preserved anywhere for future generations to access. At the time, news programs were only preserved for two weeks, after which tapes were erased and then reused.

Simpson was also motivated by a 1967 book in which former president of CBS News Fred Friendly was quoted as having said, “for the most part we were . . . just a bunch of old radio hands learning the hard way that cameras need something more than emulsion and light valves to create electronic journalism. The missing ingredients were conviction, controversy and a point of view”. Simpson's experience watching Leary, together with Friendly's comments, prompted him to think more seriously about the influence of the news on the television audience, particularly within the context of what he perceived to be one-sided news coverage of the Vietnam War that was fueling protest against the war both in the United States and abroad.

These events culminated in Simpson's decision to begin coordinating efforts to preserve news programs. Initially, he sought out funding to begin a nonprofit organization; however, he ultimately decided that a college library would be more ideal because of its expertise in preserving newspapers and magazines. Simpson selected Vanderbilt, because he graduated from the university's law school and resided in Nashville. He approached Frank P. Grisham, the new director of the Joint University Libraries, with the idea. This led to conversations with Vanderbilt chancellor G. Alexander Heard (1917-2009). On July 29, 1968, Chancellor Heard appointed an ad hoc committee to develop a feasibility proposal . Recordings began on August 5, 1968 to coincide with the 1968 Republican National Convention. The first taping was recorded on rented equipment with tape supplied by Simpson and friends of the University.

In 1980, a relationship was established with the Library of Congress to provide copies of tapes for permanent preservation by the Library of Congress. As stated in chapter six of a report of the Librarian of Congress: Television and Video Preservation 1997: “As part of the [1976] Copyright Act, the American Television and Radio Archives (ATRA) legislation authorized the Library of Congress to record off-air regularly scheduled newscasts and on-the-spot coverage of news events. The Television News Archive of Vanderbilt University has worked cooperatively with the Library to help fulfill ATRA’s mandate.” This relationship continues to the present.

In January 1994, the Archive was given a special award by the National Academy of Television Arts & Sciences Nashville/MidSouth Chapter on the occasion of its 25th anniversary. In 2013, the archive was awarded the Governors’ Award for Lifetime Achievement by the National Academy of Television Arts & Sciences Nashville/MidSouth Chapter, the regional academy's highest honor, and received an Emmy.

== Collection characteristics ==
All archive recordings have a network/time/date line added near the top of the picture to facilitate retrieval of specific news items. Broadcasts prior to May 1979 were recorded in black & white on Ampex 1-inch type A video tape recorders. Beginning in May 1979, news programs were recorded in color on 3/4 inch U-matic cassettes. Currently, the broadcasts are recorded as mpeg2, and nearly all the programs recorded in other formats have been digitally converted to that format.

Not every newscast since 1968 is available in the archive, however, due mostly to circumstances beyond control of the curators. Until the 1980s or so, the recordings were made off-air from Nashville's network television affiliates. Because of this, some weekend newscasts from 1968 until that time were not broadcast on the local stations due to station programming practices and network sports pre-emptions. For example, NBC affiliate WSM-TV (which became WSMV in November 1981) did not show the Saturday evening NBC newscast until December 1978, with a break from 1983 to 1984, because of the station's tradition of carrying syndicated country music shows in the 5:30 p.m. Central Time slot on that day of the week. NBC did not in fact begin a Saturday newscast until January 1969, and the Sunday bulletin started in August 1970; WSM did clear the Sunday broadcast, though. Also, CBS affiliate WLAC (WTVF after 1975), from September 1971 until Early 2001, did not carry the Saturday CBS Evening News, in order to broadcast local news and Hee Haw, a syndicated country music program that was produced at the WLAC/WTVF studios, among other syndicated shows and reruns between 5:30 and 7 p.m.

On the network level, between September 1971 and January 1976, CBS did not air a Sunday newscast because that hour was reserved for 60 Minutes, between 5 and 6 p.m. Central. Except for a one-year experiment on Saturdays between July 1975 and June 1976, ABC (local affiliate WNGE, now WKRN) did not begin airing newscasts on Sunday evenings until January 1979, but not in Nashville until 1981, and Saturday evenings until January 1985, with a break from Late 1988 to after the sale of Knight-Ridder to Young Broadcasting in July 1989. Other than those occurrences, most of the weekend pre-emptions were (and still are) due to coverage of sporting events such as college and professional football and golf, protected contractually from being interrupted before their endings (see "Heidi Game" for explanation).

In a number of cases, because of the convergence of preemptions on all three (historic) local network affiliates, some dates on weekends, again mainly in the 1960s and 1970s, have no newscasts at all available in the Archive. Prior to the 1980s, affiliate pre-emption of weekend network newscasts was quite common in many other medium-to-small-sized U.S. media markets, not just Nashville.

On several occasions, malfunctions of either the television set or the Ampex recorder caused a tape to have serious video or audio problems. In some cases, no recording could be made, explaining some of the weeknight date gaps in the 1960s and 1970s. Some of the oldest tapes in the collection, mainly between 1968 and 1973, suffered varying degrees of loss of picture quality due to natural deterioration before they were digitized in the 2000s.

With a few exceptions, the archive does not include recordings of documentaries and magazine shows such as 60 Minutes, 20/20, and Dateline NBC, because they typically are not concerned with immediate issues and events, and because of network policies where transcripts and video of those programs are already sold by the network news organizations for a fee by an outside provider (along with 20/20 and Dateline's drifts towards a format of precompiled true crime stories). They are thus considered not to fall under the category of newscasts included in the archive.
