= WHTN =

Television station in Murfreesboro, Tennessee

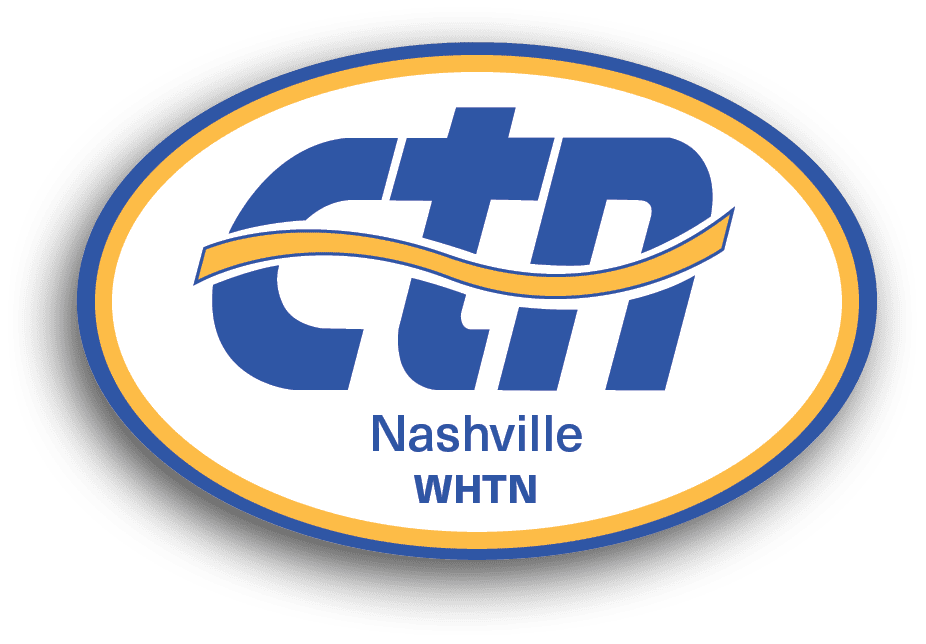
- Murfreesboro–Nashville, Tennessee; United States
- City: Murfreesboro, Tennessee
- Channels: Digital: 16 (UHF); Virtual: 39
- Branding: CTN Nashville

Programming
- Affiliations: 39.1: CTN; for others, see § Technical information and subchannels

Ownership
- Owner: Christian Television Network, Inc.

History
- First air date: December 30, 1983
- Former call signs: WFYZ (1983–1985)
- Former channel numbers: Analog: 39 (UHF, 1983–2009); Digital: 38 (UHF, 2009–2020)
- Former affiliations: Independent (1983–1986)
- Call sign meaning: Said to mean nothing

Technical information
- Licensing authority: FCC
- Facility ID: 11117
- ERP: 900 kW
- HAAT: 250 m (820 ft)
- Transmitter coordinates: 36°4′58″N 86°25′52″W

Links
- Public license information: Public file; LMS
- Website: www.ctnonline.com/affiliate-stations/ctn-nashville/

WHTN (channel 39) is a religious television station licensed to Murfreesboro, Tennessee, United States, serving the Nashville area. The station is owned by the Christian Television Network (CTN). WHTN's studios are located on Lebanon Road in Mount Juliet, and its transmitter is located on Lone Oak Road near Gladeville. The station offers 24-hour religious programming, much of which is produced either locally or at the CTN home base in Clearwater, Florida.

Although CTN has owned WHTN since 1986, it had a turbulent history before that. Channel 39 started broadcasting on December 30, 1983, as WFYZ, a second independent station for Middle Tennessee owned by Focus Communications. However, its plans to market itself were hindered by two factors: a signal that was not clearly received in all areas of Nashville and the launch less than two months later of WCAY-TV (channel 30), which had better programming and ratings. Within months, WFYZ was struggling financially; the station pivoted programming several times, from general entertainment to religious programming to music videos.

As the major investors in Focus Communications decided to focus on another business they owned, the troubled United Press International wire service, WFYZ was sold to a group led by Bob Hudson and rebranded as WHTN in November 1985. The relaunched station, however, continued to face serious economic problems which culminated in the station ceasing broadcasts in April 1986 due to unpaid electric bills. It returned to the air the next month after CTN agreed to buy the station.

== History ==
=== WFYZ: Construction and a delayed start ===
In 1980, two groups applied for Murfreesboro's channel 39: Family Television Inc., proposing a general-entertainment independent station, and Channel 39 of Murfreesboro, which proposed a hybrid independent with subscription television programming. Of the 23 stockholders in Channel 39 of Murfreesboro, 80 percent were minorities, which was expected to provide the group an advantage in the Federal Communications Commission (FCC)'s comparative hearing process. In April 1982, the FCC published its decision favoring Channel 39 of Murfreesboro. Family Television then withdrew, opting not to appeal in exchange for a partial reimbursement of its expenses in proposing the station. At the same time, two of the headline owners of channel 39 parent company Focus Communications, William Geissler and Douglas Ruhe, were part of a successful bid for news agency United Press International. In February 1983, station president John Rattliff announced that the station would sign on August 1 as a family-oriented independent outlet; the subscription programming proposal had been abandoned when the industry began to sour. By June, the deadline had slipped to October, but WFYZ had begun to move into the former Murfreesboro news bureau of Nashville's WNGE-TV in the city's Public Square. Tower installation delays pushed the station's launch date back several more times. The management hoped to launch the station on Christmas Day, but an ice storm and holiday work schedules scuttled those plans.

WFYZ began broadcasting on December 30, 1983. However, it continued to have an abbreviated broadcast day for months after it started. The rush to sign on caused a problem that management spent the early months of 1984 fixing: all the programs were being broadcast off tape machines at the transmitter site at Gladeville instead of the downtown Murfreesboro studio, as a downtown building blocked the line of sight between the two locations until the station raised the height of the tower at its studios. Also a concern was that some areas of Nashville did not get a strong signal from channel 39. However, the station had debuted a local public affairs program as well as a series of music video shows, one featuring The Tennessean music reporter Robert K. Oermann. There was also a change in general manager, as Kaki Holt was hired, making her the first woman to run a Nashville-area TV station.

=== Troubles and programming changes ===
Channel 39 had a disappointing ratings debut. In June 1984, its first ratings book after signing on, WFYZ's audience was too small for A. C. Nielsen or Arbitron to generate a rating; according to Arbitron, its afternoon block of children's programming was the only significant source of viewership. This was in stark contrast to a Nashville station that had signed on less than two months later, WCAY-TV (channel 30), owned by the TVX Broadcast Group. The June 1984 ratings book showed WCAY with three percent of the total viewing audience; this, in turn, was behind Nashville's established independent, WZTV (channel 17). The arrival of WCAY-TV compounded many of the station's problems. Seeking to remedy its technical problems, the station applied in September 1984 to move its tower closer to Nashville, but it could not do so until the allocated but unused channel 42 was moved out of the city. Months after going on the air, it had become apparent that WFYZ would be a challenge. Amid persistent rumors, one of the major stockholders, Bill Geissler, told The Tennessean on September 1 that the station was "here to stay" in spite of its troubles. On September 5, general manager Holt resigned and ownership announced it would cut back the station's hours of operation, most notably going from a 6 a.m. sign-on to a 3 p.m. start-up; local productions were halted as the station adopted a 'lean and mean' operating strategy. Debts were piling up to syndicators, radio stations, and Nashville's two daily newspapers; the latter placed the station on their "stop list" of delinquent accounts not to be given additional advertising. Tim McDonald, president of TVX, doubted his competitor's strategy, noting that programming costs would continue to be the primary expense and telling The Tennessean, "If you're going to be of service to your viewers, you have to be there. There's no television station in the U.S.—nowhere—that's successful with a part-time on-air schedule." Meanwhile, UPI Media put its only other operating television station, WFBN-TV in Joliet, Illinois, on the market.

In late September, a new general manager was hired, and WFYZ pivoted its broadcast schedule again to emphasize religious programming in the late morning and early afternoon hours it had just cut back, in part to generate income from the sale of airtime to religious ministries. Only one local show, Saturday Nite at the Videos, remained—because its host paid to air it. Programming from the short-lived Prime of Life Network, a Nashville-based service with programming for seniors, was added in December, when the station extended its broadcast day and increased its focus on programming for the Murfreesboro area. By this time, some of the station's former movie packages and syndicated shows had been acquired by WZTV and WCAY-TV. Beginning on April 1, 1985, the station filled most of its broadcast day with music videos from the Odyssey service and removed many of the remaining syndicated reruns it aired.

=== WHTN: New owners, same problems ===
In order to devote more time to the troubled UPI wire service, Geissler and Ruhe filed in June 1985 to sell WFYZ to Murfreesboro Television Corporation, a company headed by Bob Hudson. Hudson partnered with Bob Goad; the two already jointly owned two AM radio stations in Tennessee. Hudson had owned a TV station, though it had never broadcast; he owned the then-dark channel 17 in the early 1970s but failed to secure financing to return it to the air.

The station changed its call letters to WHTN on October 18, 1985, ahead of a programming revamp that took place on November 4. Hudson told The Tennessean that the new call letters did not mean "Hudson Television Network", saying, "I'm not that much of an egotist". Channel 39 switched back to a general-entertainment format, discontinuing the music videos, and added classic movies. The first day of the new programming was plagued by technical and other mishaps and filled with last-minute schedule changes. On the first edition of a live talk show hosted by program director Bill Perkins, the butterfly backdrop on the set fell down—twice.

The new programming failed to solve the deeper problems of channel 39's finances. In December 1985 alone, the Murfreesboro water company sought to shut off water to the studios after a bill went unpaid; the local electrical utility, Middle Tennessee Electric Membership Corporation (MTE), threatened the station with disconnection; incoming packages, including tapes of programs, were turned away because the station could not afford shipping costs; and RCA repossessed two of the station's three studio cameras, leaving the station with one camera for all of its studio and commercial production. WHTN's liabilities had risen to $6 million by January 1986. The transmitter experienced problems in cold weather when a heat exchanger failed, causing pipes in the water-cooled equipment to burst. By February 1986, paychecks were bouncing at the two radio stations owned by Hudson and Goad; employees walked out at both stations after they went unpaid. Among the last new programs debuted on the station was a local children's program, the daily Kimbo & Company; the host, Kim Scolaro, was only ever paid one paycheck for six weeks of work.

WHTN's precarious position came to a head at the end of March 1986, when general manager Bill Perkins resigned rather than follow orders from Hudson to lay off six employees. The employees were told Perkins had resigned for health reasons, but Perkins told The Tennessean that "a television station is not a mom-and-pop operation" to be run on a "shoestring". The station was late to sign on on April 9 because the MTE disconnected electric service over an unpaid bill and an expired bond; paychecks for the employees that remained were becoming irregular. A sheriff's sale was scheduled for the contents of the station in order to satisfy a debt that WHTN owed a local construction company, while the station's bank account was garnished.

On April 21, the electricity was cut off once more by MTE. Minority owner Goad announced he had "ended [his] financial support" for Hudson's management several months prior; Hudson approached former owners Geissler and Ruhe seeking additional funds to settle the debt with the utility.

=== CTN ownership ===
On May 6, 1986, the Christian Television Network (CTN) of Clearwater, Florida, agreed to purchase WHTN, and the station returned to air immediately with Christian programming from CTN as well as selected programs from the station's prior inventory. However, by that time, WHTN had already lost its slot on Viacom Cablevision in Nashville. By 1991, the station had relocated its studios from Murfreesboro to Mount Juliet.

WHTN-TV began digital broadcasting by November 2002. In 2009, the station shut down analog broadcasting; WHTN was one of two local stations to cease analog broadcasting before the February 17, 2009, date originally set for the digital transition. The station's digital signal remained on its pre-transition UHF channel 38, using virtual channel 39. WHTN relocated its signal from channel 38 to channel 16 on October 18, 2019, as a result of the 2016 United States wireless spectrum auction.

== Technical information and subchannels ==
WHTN's transmitter is located on Lone Oak Road near Gladeville. Its signal is multiplexed:

Subchannels of WHTN
Subchannel	Res.	Short name	Programming
39.1	1080i	WHTN	CTN
39.2	480i	N2	Newsmax2 (4:3)
39.3	480i	CTNi	CTN International (4:3)
39.4	480i	QVC-2	QVC2 (4:3)
39.5	480i	Biz TV	Biz TV
