= Dan Miller (journalist) =

American television journalist (1941–2009)

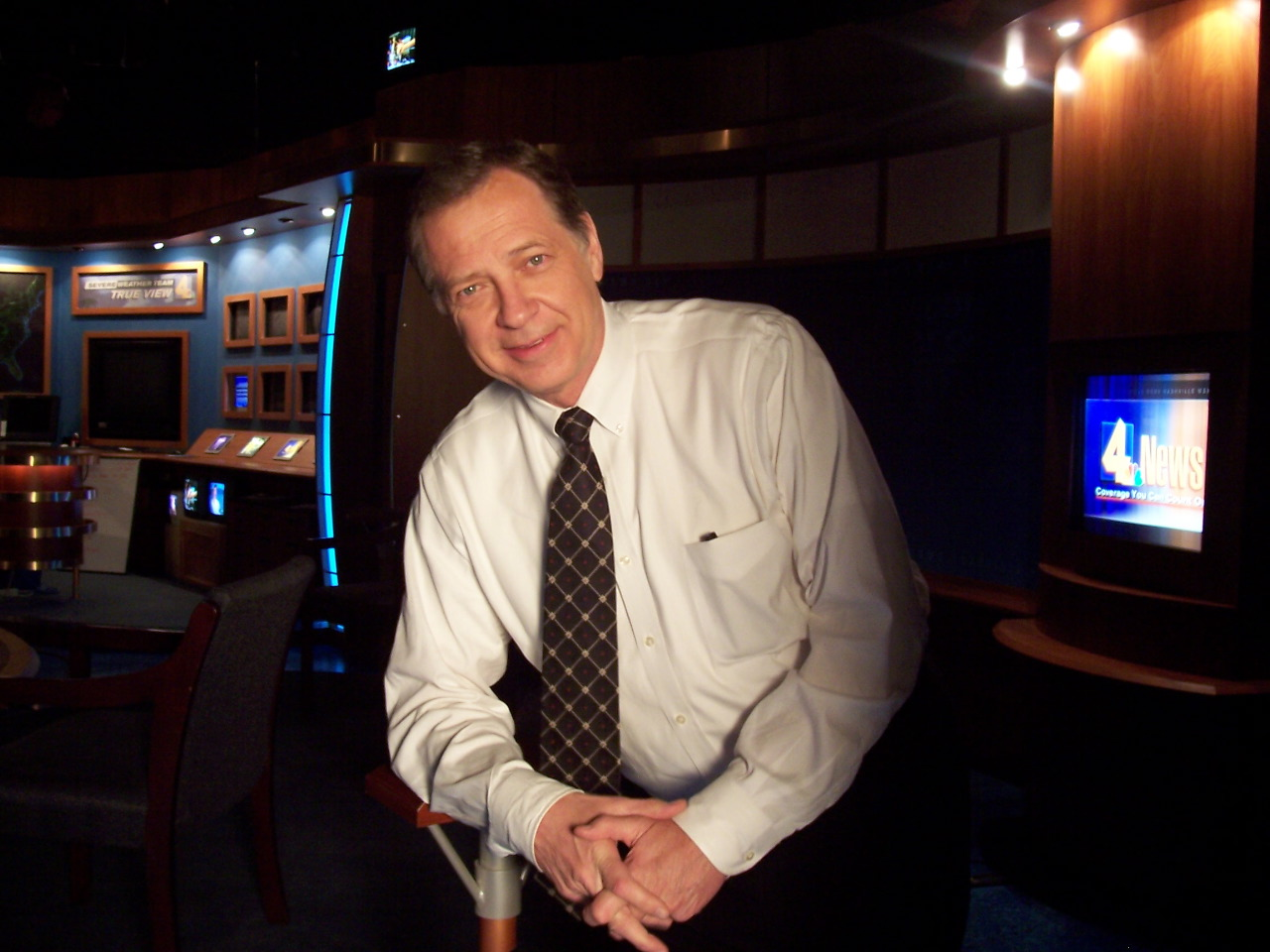
- Miller at WSMV studios
- Born: Zachariah Daniel Miller III; September 30, 1941; Augusta, Georgia, U.S.
- Died: April 8, 2009 (aged 67); Augusta, Georgia, U.S.
- Occupation: News anchor
- Notable credit(s): WSMV-TV (1969–1986, 1992–2009); KCBS-TV (1986–1987); The Pat Sajak Show (1989–1990)
- Spouse(s): Eileen McCoy (divorced), Karen Wedgeworth
- Children: Stephen, Jennifer, Darcy, McKensie
- Parent(s): Frances and Zachariah Miller Jr.

Zachariah Daniel Miller III (September 30, 1941 – April 8, 2009), commonly known as Dan Miller, was an American television personality who grew up in Augusta, Georgia, graduating from the Academy of Richmond County in 1959.

Miller was a longtime news anchorman for WSMV (formerly WSM-TV) in Nashville, Tennessee. Beginning his tenure there as a weathercaster in 1969, he moved to the news anchor desk in 1970. In 1986, Miller left Nashville to serve as principal anchor at KCBS-TV in Los Angeles, a position he held for one year. Miller then gained fame in the United States nationally as the announcer and sidekick for his friend and one-time WSM-TV colleague, Pat Sajak, during Sajak's short-lived CBS late-night talk show, The Pat Sajak Show.

Upon returning to Nashville in 1992, Dan resurrected his own interview show, Miller & Company, which originally aired Sunday nights on WSMV from 1980 to 1986. The Miller & Company revival aired weekday afternoons to a national cable audience on The Nashville Network. When it was discontinued by TNN, it was picked up locally by WSMV. In 1995, WSMV replaced Miller & Company with a 5pm newscast. A few months later, Miller returned to the WSMV anchor desk and continued his work there until his death in 2009.

Miller appeared in the CBS movie, Big Dreams and Broken Hearts: The Dottie West Story, which featured Michele Lee as Dottie West. He appeared as a guest on Hollywood Squares in 1989. In 1999, he was granted an exclusive interview with the parents of murdered six-year-old JonBenét Ramsey, which led to many appearances on nationally televised news programs.

Miller was also a prolific writer of essays about life on and off the television screen, at "Dan Miller's Notebook".

== Personal life ==
Miller was born in 1941 in Augusta, Georgia, to Zachariah Daniel Miller Jr. and Frances Giles Miller (née Scott).

He married and later divorced Eileen McCoy, with whom he had three children: Stephen, Jennifer, and Darcy. Miller later married Karen Wedgeworth, with whom he had daughter McKensie.

== Death ==
Miller died on April 8, 2009, after suffering a heart attack while walking in Augusta, Georgia, with longtime friend and WSMV sports director Rudy Kalis. He had returned to his hometown to attend The Masters golf tournament with Kalis and another friend and colleague, Terry Bulger. He was survived by his three children from his first marriage, his second wife, and their 10-year-old daughter.
