= Jean and Alexander Heard Library =

Jean and Alexander Heard Library Vanderbilt University
- 36.1457°N 86.8002°W
- Location: Nashville, Tennessee, United States
- Established: 1873
- Branches: 10

Collection
- Size: 8 million

Access and use
- Access requirements: depends on library

Other information
- Budget: US$24.3 million
- Director: Jon Shaw, University Librarian
- Employees: 165
- Website: library.vanderbilt.edu

The Jean and Alexander Heard Library system is made up of several campus libraries at Vanderbilt University. These include Eskind Biomedical Library, Central Library, Divinity Library, Alyne Queener Massey Law Library, Walker Management Library, Anne Potter Wilson Music Library, Peabody Library, Sarah Shannon Stevenson Science & Engineering Library, Special Collections and University Archives, and the Television News Archive. It also houses the world's most extensive and complete archive of television news from 1968 to the present day.

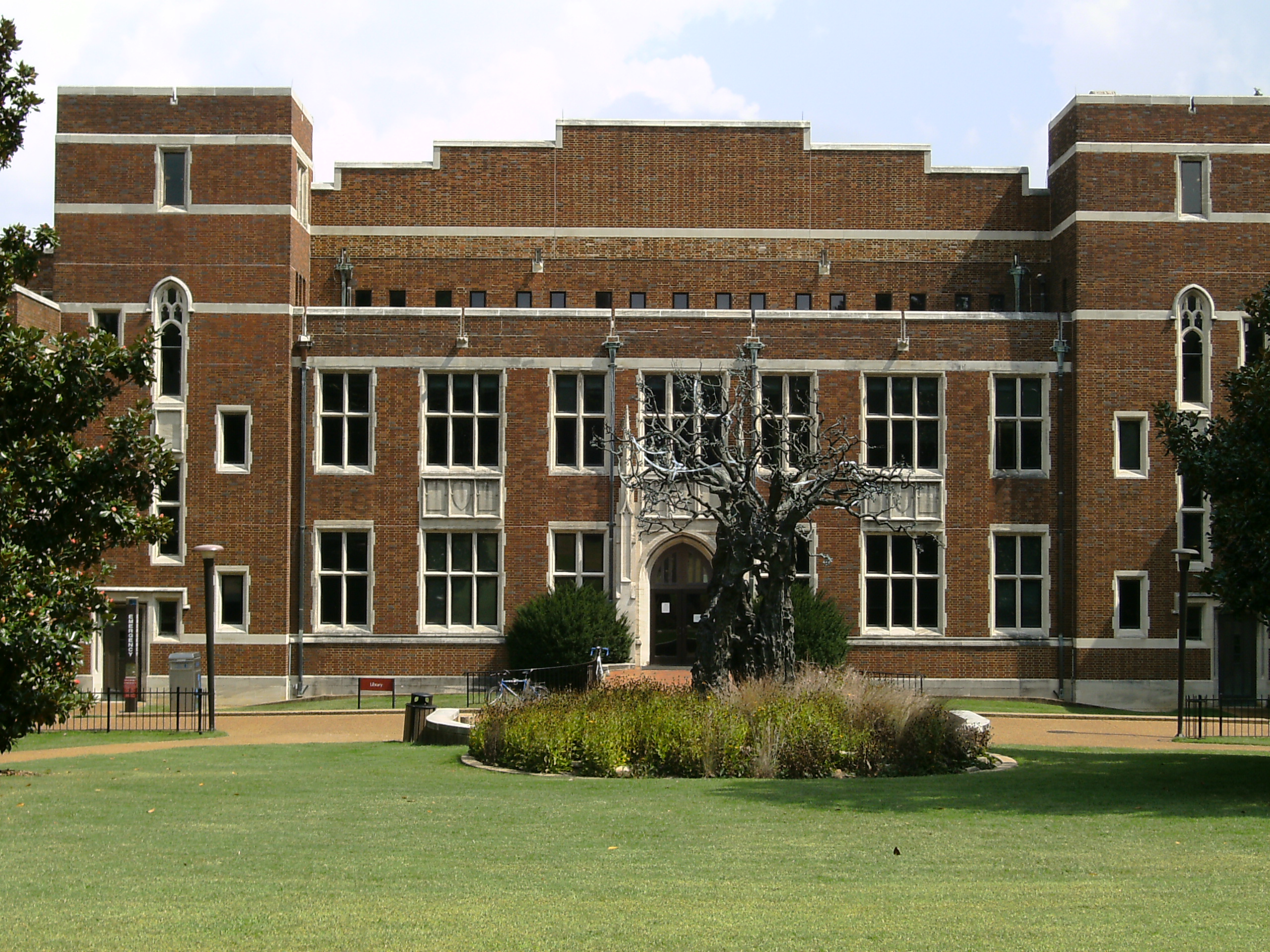
Vanderbilt University Central Library

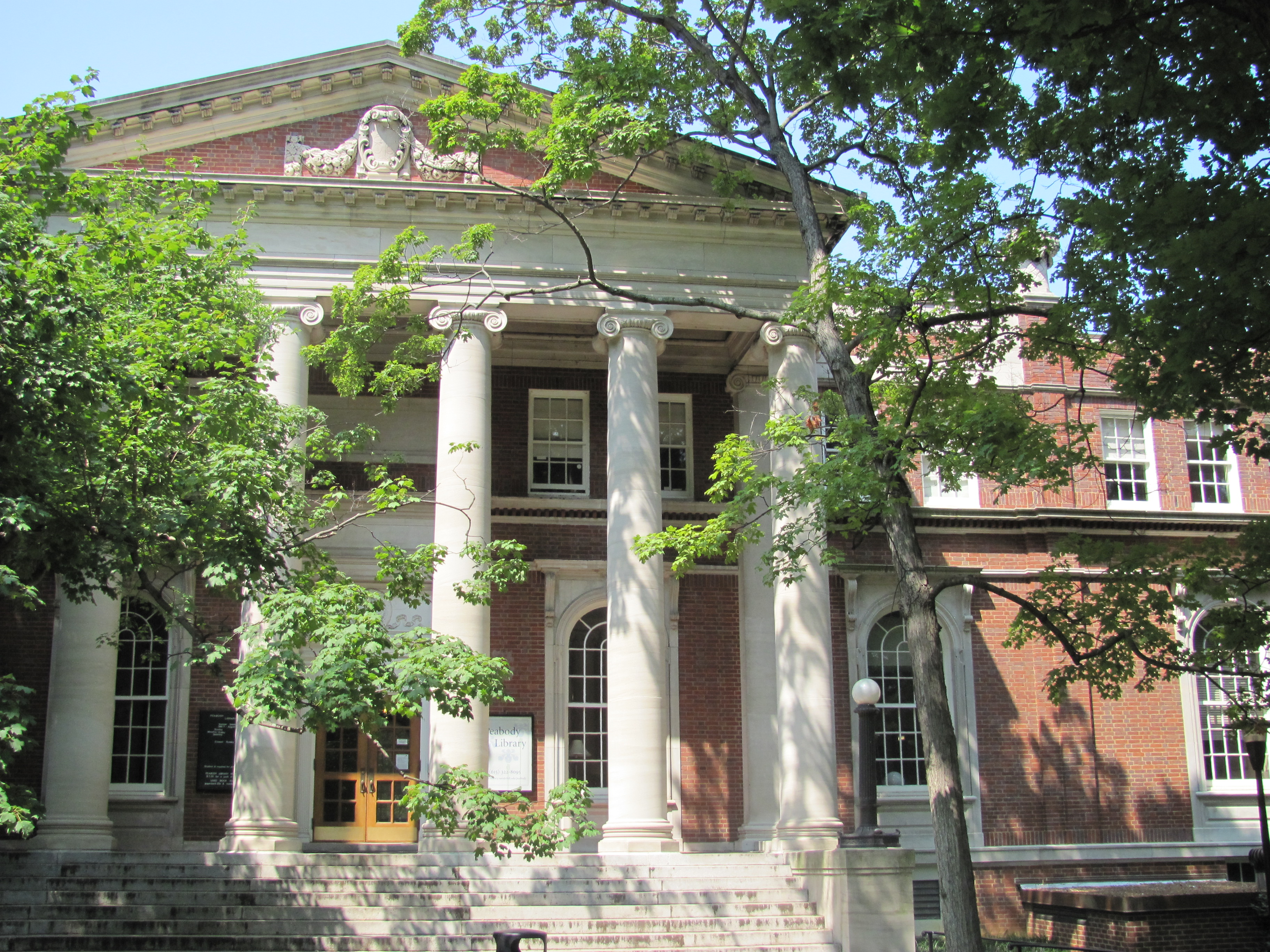
Vanderbilt University Peabody Library

== History ==
The original Vanderbilt Library was housed in the Main Building (later College Hall and now Kirkland Hall) at the time of the university's founding in 1873. The collection held approximately 6,000 volumes and was open from 9:00-2:00 daily under the supervision of a junior faculty member. Over the years, the library grew in size before being gutted by fire in 1905. Efforts to rebuild the library were supported by other universities, with Yale University and the Library of Congress donating thousands of publications to the university. However, another fire in 1932 destroyed almost half of the university libraries.

A major overhaul of the library occurred under A. Frederick Kuhlman as the director of the library. Under him, the Joint University Library Corporation was created by trust indenture. The participating libraries were Vanderbilt University, George Peabody College for Teachers, and Scarritt College for Christian Workers. The Joint University Library was inaugurated in 1941, during Kulman's tenure; the architect was Henry C. Hibbs, with New York architects Githens and Keally consulting as library specialists. At the time of the opening, the library held nearly 400,000 volumes.

In 1961, the library opened the stacks to undergraduate students, a privilege once reserved for graduate students and faculty. In 1968, the Television News Archives was instituted. The Joint University Library Corporation was dissolved in 1979 with the merger of Vanderbilt and Peabody and the system became known as the Vanderbilt University Library. It was renamed the Jean and Alexander Heard Library five years later, in honor of Chancellor Emeritus Alexander Heard and his wife Jean.

== Campus libraries ==
The university library system comprises the following libraries:

- Eskind Biomedical Library
- Central Library
- Divinity Library
- Alyne Queener Massey Law Library
- Walker Management Library
- Anne Potter Wilson Music Library
- Peabody Library
- Sarah Shannon Stevenson Science and Engineering Library

Special collections

- Special Collections and University Archives
- Television News Archive

== Library heads ==
=== First Librarian ===
- Dora Sanders (1914-1923)
- Will Ella Johnson Smith (1923-1930)
- Isabel Howell (1931-1936)

=== Director of Libraries ===
- A. Frederick Kuhlman (1936-1960)
- David Kaser (1960-1968)
- Frank P. Grisham (1968-1984)
- Malcolm Getz (1984-1995)

=== University Librarian ===
- Paul M. Gherman (1996-2009)

=== Dean of Libraries ===
- Connie Vinita Dowell (2009-2014)
- Joseph D. Combs, Jr. [Interim] (2014-2016)

=== University Librarian ===
- Valerie Hotchkiss (2016–2021)
- Hilary Craiglow [Interim] (2021–2022)
- Jon Shaw (2022–present)

== Sol Biderman Collection ==
The Sol Biderman Collection at the library contains Brazilian posters, Brazilian art and architecture exhibition catalogs, engravings, woodcuts, invitations to art exhibitions, handbills, programs, photographs, and cordel literature or literatura de cordel, and other ephemera (e.g. Brazilian post card art, gift cards, and invitations to art exhibits).

The collection was donated by Sol Biderman, a journalist for Time in São Paulo. Following is a list of some of the items in the collection indexed by artist:

- Nelson Aguilar: Art exhibition catalog from an August 1986 exhibit at Montesanti Galleria in São Paulo.
- Antônio Henrique Amaral: Art exhibition catalog from a 1987 exhibit at Montesanti Galleria in São Paulo:
  - Art exhibition catalog from June 1997 at Dan Galeria in São Paulo titled "Works on Paper."
  - Invitation to art exhibition and award ceremony from an October 2000 exhibit at the Pinacoteca do Estado de São Paulo.
- Carla Amaral: Art exhibition catalog for 1995 exhibit at the Museum of Contemporary Art, University of São Paulo.
- J. Amaral: Art exhibition catalog from a 1983 exhibit in São Paulo at the 17th São Paulo Art Biennial. The exhibition was titled "Las vida es una transformación transitoria."
