= The Pat Sajak Show =

American late-night talk show

- Written by: Fred Wolf; Andy Cowan; David S. Williger; Kevin Mulholland
- Starring: Pat Sajak
- Announcer: Dan Miller
- Music by: Tom Scott (bandleader)
- Country of origin: United States
- No. of seasons: 1
- No. of episodes: 298

Production
- Producers: Paul Gilbert, David S. Williger, John Scura
- Production locations: CBS Television City; Hollywood, California
- Camera setup: Multi-camera
- Running time: 60–90 minutes

Original release
- Network: CBS
- Release: January 9, 1989 – April 13, 1990

Related
- Pat Sajak Weekend

The Pat Sajak Show is an American late-night talk show hosted by Pat Sajak (then best known as the host of Wheel of Fortune) that aired on CBS from January 9, 1989, to April 13, 1990. The program was CBS's first network late-night talk show since The Merv Griffin Show ended in 1972.

The program was developed as a competitor to NBC's The Tonight Show Starring Johnny Carson. It initially aired for 90 minutes but was reduced to one hour in October 1989. Ratings remained substantially below Carson's and were also hurt by the success of the syndicated The Arsenio Hall Show. CBS announced the show's cancellation in April 1990.

== Cast ==
The show was hosted by Pat Sajak, best known as host of the game show Wheel of Fortune. To do the talk show, Sajak left the NBC daytime version of Wheel, but remained as host of the syndicated nighttime version.

Sajak's announcer and sidekick on the show was Dan Miller, his friend and former colleague from their time working together in the mid-1970s at WSM-TV (now WSMV-TV) in Nashville, Tennessee. The in-studio band was led by jazz musician Tom Scott, who subsequently served the same role on the short-lived Chevy Chase Show.

The house band members were: Tom Scott (saxes), Jerry Peters (piano), Barnaby Finch (keyboards), Art Rodriguez (drums), Tim Landers (bass), Eric Gale, Carlos Rios, or Pat Kelley (guitar), and Dave Koz (saxes, flute, and the EWI—electronic wind instrument).

== History ==
=== Pre-production ===
Sajak was hired by Michael Brockman, the CBS vice-president for daytime, children's and late-night programming, who wanted to have a late-night talk show established when Johnny Carson eventually announced his retirement from NBC's The Tonight Show. Brockman had known Sajak since the two worked for NBC in the late 1970s. At that time, Brockman had approached Sajak, then a weatherman at KNBC-TV in Los Angeles, about hosting a game show, but Sajak rejected the idea, saying what he really wanted to do was host a talk show. Brockman kept him in mind over the years, and at a lunch meeting in 1986 he reminded Sajak (who by then was hosting Wheel) about the conversation. Sajak confirmed his interest in a talk show, and Brockman went to work getting approvals from his management for the plan and getting network affiliates to commit to the show.

CBS spent more than $4 million for a new soundstage (Studio 42, later re-designated as Studio 56) for the show at its Television City studios located above the four studios on the first floor. A staff of more than 30 was hired, and Sajak signed a guaranteed two-year contract for what was reportedly $60,000 a week.

In an interview held a month before the show premiered, Sajak said he was "not looking to raise the level of TV"; he summarized the elements planned for the show, a plan that "steal[s] liberally" from talk shows past and present.

==== Premiere ====
Chevy Chase was the show's first guest; his interview was followed by one with Joan Van Ark, a performance by and brief interview with The Judds, an interview with the outgoing commissioner of baseball, Peter Ueberroth (interrupted briefly when Chase, who followed late-night talk show conventions of the time and remained seated on stage during the show's other guest appearances, raised his hand and asked if he could go to the bathroom). There was an interview with Michael Gross, and then the show ended with a performance by stand-up comic Dennis Wolfberg.

==== Format ====
The show's set was similar to that of The Tonight Show Starring Johnny Carson. Its format emulated Carson's model, featuring a monologue, comedy bits, interviews with celebrities, and performances by musicians and comedians. The Pat Sajak Show began as a 90-minute show, but was reduced to 60 minutes in October 1989. CBS executives said the show was shortened because the late-night talk show format was better suited for a 60-minute time slot.

=== Rush Limbaugh guest-host appearance ===
On March 30, 1990, radio host Rush Limbaugh guest-hosted the program. During a discussion of abortion, Limbaugh entered the studio audience and became involved in heated exchanges with audience members who opposed his views. Further heckling occurred during a discussion of affirmative action, and the audience was eventually cleared before the final segment.

Limbaugh later claimed that some of the protesters had been placed in the audience by the show's producers as a publicity stunt.

=== Cancellation ===
The program struggled in the ratings throughout its run. By April 1990, The Pat Sajak Show was averaging a 2.6 Nielsen rating and a 10 percent audience share, substantially below The Tonight Show Starring Johnny Carson. The syndicated The Arsenio Hall Show, which premiered shortly before Sajak's program, also drew many of the younger viewers CBS had hoped to attract.

Some CBS affiliates delayed the program in favor of more profitable syndicated programming, further reducing its national audience. CBS attempted to improve the program in early 1990 with a redesigned set and changes to its format, but the revisions did not improve its ratings.

CBS announced the cancellation on April 9, 1990, following that week's broadcasts. The final episode aired on April 13. The network temporarily replaced the program with off-network reruns while preparing new late-night programming for the fall.

== Legacy ==
The Pat Sajak Show was CBS's last attempt to establish a traditional network late-night talk show before the network signed David Letterman in 1993. Late Show with David Letterman premiered that August and established a long-running CBS presence in the 11:35 p.m. time period.

The program also overlapped with the rise of syndicated late-night programming. The Arsenio Hall Show, which began in January 1989, became a stronger competitor for younger viewers and was carried by some CBS affiliates in preference to Sajak's program.

Sajak returned his full attention to Wheel of Fortune after the talk show's cancellation.

== See also ==
- List of late-night American network TV programs
