= WTNX-LD =

Television station in Nashville, Tennessee

WTNX-LD and WFET-LD

WTNX-LD: Nashville, Tennessee; WFET-LD: Lewisburg–Columbia, Tennessee; United States
- Channels for WTNX-LD: Digital: 15 (UHF); Virtual: 29
- Channels for WFET-LD: Digital: 29 (UHF); Virtual: 29
- Branding: Telemundo Nashville

Programming
- Affiliations: 29.1: Telemundo; 4.10: NBC; for others, see § Subchannels

Ownership
- Owner: Gray Media; (Gray Television Licensee, LLC)
- Sister stations: WSMV-TV

History
- Founded: WFET-LD: 2003
- First air date: WTNX-LD: June 22, 2021; WFET-LD: 2005
- Former call signs: WTNX-LD: W15ER-D (2021–2022); WFET-LD: W34DB (2003–2012); W29DM-D (2012–2019)
- Former channel number: WFET-LD: Analog: 34 (UHF, 2003–2012)
- Former affiliations: WTNX-LD: Religious independent (2021); NBC (as a rebroadcast of WSMV-TV, 2021–2022); WFET-LD: America One (2005–2014); GBN (2005–2015); Independent (2005–2016, 2019–2022); FETV (2020–2021)
- Call sign meaning: WTNX-LD: "Telemundo Nashville"; WFET-LD: "We're Family Entertainment Television" (From former affiliation)

Technical information
- Licensing authority: FCC
- Facility ID: WTNX-LD: 187449; WFET-LD: 168849
- Class: LD
- ERP: 15 kW
- HAAT: WTNX-LD: 103.2 m (339 ft); WFET-LD: 198 m (650 ft)
- Transmitter coordinates: WTNX-LD: 36°10′37.3″N 86°46′41.2″W; WFET-LD: 35°37′45.2″N 86°55′30.1″W
- Translators: W14EE-D 14.1 (UHF) Algood–Cookeville; W29FR-D 29.1 (UHF) Lebanon–Nashville

Links
- Public license information: WTNX-LD: LMS

WTNX-LD (channel 29) is a low-power television station in Nashville, Tennessee, United States, affiliated with the Spanish-language network Telemundo. Owned by Gray Media, it also functions as a repeater for its full-power sister station, NBC affiliate WSMV-TV (channel 4). The two stations share studios on Knob Road in West Nashville; WTNX-LD's transmitter is located on Oldham Street near downtown.

WTNX-LD is relayed on WFET-LD (channel 29) in Lewisburg (also serving Columbia, with transmitter on Cranford Hollow Road east of Columbia).

== History ==
=== First incarnation of Telemundo Nashville (2006–2010) ===
From 2006 to 2010, Telemundo was broadcast as a second digital subchannel of WSMV-TV, making it the first full-power Spanish-language TV service in the city. However, after five years on the air, the subchannel went defunct on December 31, 2010, leaving Nashville at the time with only one Spanish-language television station, WLLC-LP (channel 42), the area's Telefutura (now UniMás) outlet; WLLC had been the first Spanish-language TV station in the city upon affiliating in 2004.

=== Origins and as a translator station ===
Landover 2, LLC, applied for and was granted a construction permit to build a new low-power TV station on channel 41, W41EI-D, at Algood (a suburb of Cookeville). As a result of the repack, the permit sat for several years. The station would be purchased by Lowcountry 34 Media, LLC (owned by Jeffrey Winemiller) on July 30, 2021; Winemiller relocated the facility to channel 15 at Nashville, with the new call sign W15ER-D, and completed construction of the station, airing two subchannels of religious programs.

Winemiller initially filed to sell W15ER-D to Marquee Broadcasting in August 2021, but he instead opted to sell another low-power station, W09DM-D (now WNSH-LD), to the group. Winemiller then filed to sell the channel 15 station to Gray Television, which was in the process of merging with the Meredith Corporation, owner of WSMV-TV. The $3.75 million transaction between Lowcountry 34 and Gray included 24 different low-power facilities, including two in Tennessee. On December 30, 2021, W15ER-D converted from airing religious programming to a rebroadcast translator of the WSMV-TV multiplex. As WSMV-TV is broadcast on the VHF band, the additional UHF facility improves reception with smaller indoor antennas—which more easily receive UHF—in the Nashville metro area.

=== Telemundo conversion ===
Gray announced on May 3, 2022, that it had reached an agreement with Telemundo to start Telemundo channels, primarily as adjuncts to Gray stations, in 22 additional Southern markets and renew existing affiliations in 12 others. The new service launched August 29, 2022, with the renamed WTNX-LD also carrying the main WSMV 4.1 subchannel as 4.10.

== WFET-LD history ==
On January 8, 2022, the Bailey family signed a deal to sell WFET-LD to Gray Television for $125,000. The sale of the station was finalized on February 22, 2022. Gray did not reveal future plans of WFET-LD before the sale of the station was finalized.

WFET-LD would return to the air on September 13, 2022, as a repeater of Telemundo affiliate WTNX-LD.

== Newscasts ==
In the 5 p.m. CT timeslot on weekdays, the station airs a locally-oriented newscast, Telemundo Noticias Tennessee, produced at Gray Television headquarters in Atlanta. The station's statewide-oriented newscast aired its debut edition on November 28, 2022.

== Subchannels ==
The stations' signals are multiplexed:

Subchannels of WTNX-LD and WFET-LD
| Subchannel | Res. | Short name | Programming |
|---|---|---|---|
| 29.1 | 1080i | WTNX-LD | Telemundo |
| 29.2 | 480i | The365 | 365BLK |
| 29.3 | 480i | Outlaw | Outlaw |
| 4.10 | 1080i | WSMV-HD | NBC (WSMV-TV) |

Simulcast of subchannels of another station
