= WUXP-TV =

Television station in Nashville, Tennessee

ATSC 3.0 station
- Nashville, Tennessee; United States
- Channels: Digital: 21 (UHF); Virtual: 30
- Branding: MyTV30

Programming
- Affiliations: 30.1: Independent with MyNetworkTV; 30.2: Quest; 30.3: Comet

Ownership
- Owner: Sinclair Broadcast Group; (WUXP Licensee, LLC)
- Sister stations: WNAB, WZTV

History
- First air date: February 18, 1984
- Former call signs: WCAY-TV (1984–1989); WXMT (1989–1996)
- Former channel numbers: Analog: 30 (UHF, 1984–2009)
- Former affiliations: Independent (1984–1986, 1990–1995); Fox (1986–1990); UPN (1995–2006)
- Call sign meaning: Station was an affiliate of UPN

Technical information
- Licensing authority: FCC
- Facility ID: 9971
- ERP: 1,000 kW
- HAAT: 413 m (1,355 ft)
- Transmitter coordinates: 36°15′49.8″N 86°47′38.9″W

Links
- Public license information: Public file; LMS
- Website: mytv30web.com

WUXP-TV (channel 30) is a television station in Nashville, Tennessee, United States. It is programmed primarily as an independent station, but maintains a secondary affiliation with MyNetworkTV. WUXP-TV is owned by Sinclair Broadcast Group alongside WZTV (channel 17), an affiliate of Fox and The CW, and co-managed with WNAB (channel 58). The three stations share studios on Mainstream Drive along the Cumberland River; WUXP-TV's transmitter is located along I-24 in Whites Creek.

Channel 30 in Nashville began broadcasting in February 1984 as WCAY-TV. Built by the TVX Broadcast Group, the station competed as Nashville's second independent outlet with WZTV for most of the 1980s. It was the Fox affiliate in Nashville from 1986 to 1990 before selling most of its programming inventory to WZTV amid a competitive market. Renamed WXMT in 1989 after being purchased by MT Communications, the station remained the second independent in Nashville and affiliated with UPN in 1995. WZTV began managing channel 30's operations in 1996, a year in which the license was sold and the station renamed WUXP-TV. Sinclair assumed control of the station in 1998, when it acquired WZTV, and purchased it outright in 2000; when UPN folded in 2006, the station switched to MyNetworkTV. WUXP-TV and WNAB are Nashville's two ATSC 3.0 (NextGen TV) stations.

== History ==
=== The TVX years ===
In November 1981, the Federal Communications Commission (FCC) designated 13 competing applications for UHF channel 30 in Nashville for comparative hearing. The very large field featured names well-known in other cities, including Carolina Christian Broadcasting, Golden West Broadcasters, and American Television and Communications (the cable TV division of Time, Inc.). By January 1982, only five of the applicants were still seeking for the construction permit: Television Corporation of Tennessee, a company headquartered in Norfolk, Virginia, in which mayor Richard Fulton became a minority investor; Music City Thirty, owned primarily by Methodists; Satellite Broadcasting Systems of Tulsa, Oklahoma; Nash Broadcasting; and Page Broadcasting.

The FCC granted the construction permit to Television Corporation (TVX, later known simply as TVX Broadcast Group) in August 1983. By that time, the call letters of WCAY-TV had been selected, as had a tower site. Meanwhile, the Nashville market—already having WZTV, an independent in service since 1976—gained a second independent station with the launch of WFYZ in Murfreesboro on December 31. What was once a mid-April launch target moved up to February as TVX signed for studio space at Third Avenue South and Peabody Street.

WCAY-TV began broadcasting on February 18, 1984. It immediately entered into a money-losing competition with WFYZ; however, TVX outlasted the Murfreesboro station, with its limited financial resources. In September 1984, WFYZ executed the first of several rounds of cutbacks. That station, sold and renamed WHTN in 1985, exited the battle by converting to a Christian format in May 1986.

In January 1986, TVX—already having relegated WHTN to the status, per company chairman J. Timothy McDonald, of showing "freebies no one else wants"—refocused its attack on WZTV, Nashville's leading independent. While TVX's independents had mostly risen to lead their markets, WCAY-TV was the exception. The station became affiliated that fall with the new Fox network, but TVX continued to need to devote additional attention to improving channel 30's ratings against WZTV, hiring new management and increasing its promotional efforts.

Despite the fact that WCAY-TV was not TVX's most successful station, the company expressed its resolve to stick with the Nashville market. However, financial circumstances combined to change that policy. In 1987, TVX acquired five major-market independent stations from Taft Broadcasting. This purchase left TVX highly leveraged and highly vulnerable. TVX's bankers, Salomon Brothers, provided the financing for the acquisition and in return held more than 60 percent of the company. The company was to pay Salomon Brothers $200 million on January 1, 1988, and missed the first payment deadline, having been unable to lure investors to its junk bonds even before Black Monday. As a result, TVX sought buyers for some of its smaller stations to reduce its debt load. That May, TVX announced the sale of WCAY-TV to SouthWest MultiMedia Corporation of Houston for $6 million. However, this deal fell apart over the intervening months.

=== MT Communications ownership ===
In the wake of the SouthWest MultiMedia sale effort stalling, TVX found another buyer for WCAY-TV: MT Communications, the company of Michael Thompson. Thompson already had a history with independent television in Nashville; he had been one of WZTV's executives when it went back on the air in 1976. The call letters were changed to WXMT in October 1989 as part of the insertion of "MT" into the call signs of its stations.

MT Communications assumed the challenge TVX had faced in its entire history running channel 30: passing WZTV in the ratings. As MT was buying WCAY-TV, Act III Broadcasting acquired WZTV. Act III would make a reputation as a consolidator of independents in medium markets. In 1988, Act III simultaneously acquired Richmond, Virginia, independent WRLH-TV and the programming of competitor WVRN-TV, incorporating the latter's programming and physical assets into the former as the latter went off the air permanently. The next year, it agreed to acquire WUTV in Buffalo, New York, along with the programming inventory of competitor WNYB-TV, which then was sold to a Christian broadcaster; the deal was not completed until June 1990 owing to ownership complications in the market. Act III clearly coveted the Fox affiliation of WXMT; vice president Bert Ellis stated in 1989 that "we bought ZTV figuring it would eventually get a Fox affiliation", even though Fox's vice president of affiliate relations for the central region characterized such a move as "very unlikely".

Two factors worked in favor of Act III. The Nashville market was not large enough at the time to support what were essentially two competing independents; like most early Fox affiliates, WXMT was mostly programmed as an independent. Additionally, Fox had a clause in its TVX affiliation agreements, inherited by MT Communications, that allowed it to review its affiliation status after one year of the station being sold. Fox was known to prefer to affiliate with the top-rated independent in a market, and speculation arose as to how long WXMT could maintain the Fox affiliation in Nashville. Negotiations began in 1989, originally with the intent that WXMT buy WZTV's inventory, but that deal fell apart. On February 6, 1990, after negotiations that had been in progress for a week, Act III acquired the Fox affiliation and the vast majority of WXMT's programming inventory from MT Communications. With immediate effect, Fox programming, The Disney Afternoon, Cincinnati Reds baseball, and syndicated programs including The Arsenio Hall Show and Star Trek: The Next Generation moved to WZTV; WXMT, which was initially to surrender all of its programming inventory, maintained some children's programs and filled much of its air time with the Home Shopping Network. Nashville became the first of four markets, all in the South, where Fox moved its affiliation during 1990; of the other three, two (Little Rock, Arkansas, and Memphis) involved ex-TVX stations, with the Memphis station losing its Fox affiliation also owned by MT.

In the subsequent years, WXMT rebuilt itself. From 1992 to 1994, it aired The Scene at 9, a prime time newscast produced by Nashville NBC affiliate WSMV-TV and the first such broadcast in the market. The station made an early commitment to the United Paramount Network (UPN), signing on to become an affiliate in November 1993—more than a year before it began programming in 1995.

=== Sullivan and Sinclair management ===
In 1996, Sullivan Broadcasting, which had purchased WZTV from Act III the year prior, entered into a local marketing agreement—with an option to buy—to run most of the operations of WXMT, concurrent with Mission Broadcasting acquiring WXMT's license assets. The call letters were changed that August to WUXP-TV, reflecting the UPN affiliation. In 1998, Sinclair Broadcast Group acquired Sullivan Broadcasting, including WZTV and its agreement to manage WUXP-TV. In 1998, Sinclair announced its intent to purchase Sullivan outright; the LMA with WUXP was included in the deal. Two years later, after the FCC legalized outright duopolies, Sinclair acquired WUXP-TV from Mission as well as three other stations it had been programming. Sinclair began managing WNAB (channel 58) in 2002.

In 2006, UPN and The WB merged to form The CW. Sinclair was first a partner of MyNetworkTV, and WUXP was signed as its Nashville affiliate in early March, shortly after MyNetworkTV was announced in late February. Two months later, Sinclair signed an affiliation agreement covering eight markets with The CW in May; this included WNAB.

== Local programming ==
=== News and public affairs ===
WUXP-TV airs Comments with Dr. Haney, a local interview program featuring retired Tennessee State University professor Dr. James Haney, on Saturday mornings. The station has no dedicated newscasts but does air morning and late evening blocks of The National Desk, Sinclair's national news service.

=== Sports ===
WUXP-TV began airing a Thursday Night Lights package of local high school football games in 2008. This expanded to include weekly high school basketball telecasts in 2014; that same year, the football package shifted to Fridays under the label Friday Night Rivals. In 2013, WUXP-TV began airing the state championship football games of the Tennessee Secondary School Athletic Association (TSSAA) as part of a statewide network.

From 2018 to 2022, spanning the team's shift from the United Soccer League to Major League Soccer, WUXP-TV was the primary broadcaster of Nashville SC matches, an arrangement that only ended when Apple assumed all local and national television rights in MLS.

== Technical information and subchannels ==
The station's ATSC 1.0 channels are carried on the multiplexed signals of other Nashville television stations:

Subchannels provided by WUXP-TV (ATSC 1.0)
Subchannel	Res.	Short name	Programming	ATSC 1.0 host
30.1	720p	WUXP-MY	Main WUXP-TV programming	WKRN-TV
30.2	480i	Quest	Quest (4:3)	WZTV
30.3	480i	Comet	Comet	WSMV-TV

=== ATSC 3.0 ===
From its transmitter along I-24 in Whites Creek, WUXP-TV broadcasts these subchannels in ATSC 3.0 (NextGen TV) format:

Subchannels of WUXP (ATSC 3.0)
Subchannel	Res.	Short name	Programming
5.1	1080p	WTVF	CBS (WTVF)
8.11		WNPT-VC	PBS (WNPT)
17.1	720p	WZTV	Fox (WZTV)
17.10	1080p	T2	T2
17.11		PBTV	Pickleballtv
17.2	720p	CW	The CW (WZTV)
30.1	720p	WUXP	Main WUXP-TV programming

Subchannel broadcast with digital rights management
Subchannel streamed via the internet

=== Analog-to-digital conversion ===
WUXP-TV shut down its analog signal, over UHF channel 30, on February 17, 2009, which was intended to be the official date on which full-power television stations in the United States transitioned from analog to digital broadcasts under federal mandate. The deadline was moved to June 12, 2009, but WUXP decided to convert on the original deadline. The station's digital signal remained on its pre-transition UHF channel 21, using virtual channel 30.
