= WZTV =

Television station in Nashville, Tennessee

- Nashville, Tennessee; United States
- Channels: Digital: 20 (UHF); Virtual: 17
- Branding: Fox 17; Nashville CW (17.2)

Programming
- Affiliations: 17.1: Fox; 17.2: The CW; for others, see § Subchannels

Ownership
- Owner: Sinclair Broadcast Group; (WZTV Licensee, LLC)
- Sister stations: WNAB, WUXP-TV

History
- First air date: August 5, 1968 (Note: The station launched as WMCV on August 5, 1968, and remained on the air until March 14, 1971, when its owners left the air for financial reorganization. The station was sold twice before returning to the air on March 6, 1976, as WZTV.)
- Former call signs: WMCV (1968–1974); WTLT (1974–1975)
- Former channel numbers: Analog: 17 (UHF, 1968–2009); Digital: 15 (UHF, 2001–2019)
- Former affiliations: Independent (1968–1971, 1976–1990)
- Call sign meaning: The "Z" does not stand for anything, the "TV" indicates that it is a television station.

Technical information
- Licensing authority: FCC
- Facility ID: 418
- ERP: 1,000 kW
- HAAT: 427 m (1,401 ft)
- Transmitter coordinates: 36°15′49.8″N 86°47′38.9″W

Links
- Public license information: Public file; LMS
- Website: fox17.com; cwnashville.tv

WZTV (channel 17) is a television station in Nashville, Tennessee, United States, affiliated with Fox and The CW. It is owned by Sinclair Broadcast Group alongside WUXP-TV (channel 30), an independent station with MyNetworkTV, and co-managed with WNAB (channel 58). The three stations share studios on Mainstream Drive along the Cumberland River; WZTV's transmitter is located along I-24 in Whites Creek.

Channel 17 in Nashville was first activated in August 1968 as WMCV, owned by local consortium Music City Video. It was the first ultra high frequency (UHF) station in Nashville and its first independent station, but it was unable to sustain itself financially and left the air in March 1971. Two years later, it was sold at bankruptcy auction to radio executive Bob Hudson, who attempted to return channel 17 to air as WTLT. Had Hudson been able to resume service, channel 17 would have been the first Black-owned television station in the United States. However, an economic downturn prevented him from raising sufficient capital to begin operations, and it fell to Reel Broadcasting Corporation, owned by Robert K. Zelle, to put the station back on air as WZTV in March 1976. In 1980, Zelle sold WZTV to Multimedia, Inc., which used Nashville as a base to distribute country music-related TV series. WZTV also remained the market's leading independent despite competition from two new startups in the decade.

Act III Broadcasting acquired WZTV in 1988 and purchased the Fox affiliation for the Nashville market in 1990, moving it from WCAY-TV (channel 30), where it had been since the network's inception. Act III was purchased in 1995 and became Sullivan Broadcasting, during which time the station began airing a local newscast for the first time. Sinclair purchased the Sullivan stations, including WZTV, in 1998 and has continued to expand the station's local news programming. The CW programming moved to a subchannel of WZTV from WNAB in 2021.

== History ==
=== WMCV ===
On January 25, 1966, Music City Video, Inc., a consortium of local investors with connections to several local radio stations, applied to the Federal Communications Commission (FCC) for a construction permit to build a new TV station on channel 24 in Nashville. The application was spearheaded by Alven S. Ghertner, who proposed to build studios on land he owned that was occupied by a service station. At the time, Nashville had no independent station, nor did it have any stations in the ultra high frequency (UHF) band; the Music City Video station was intended to fill both voids with a heavy emphasis on live programming. The FCC granted the permit application on July 7, 1966, by which time channel 24 had been switched to channel 17 because of a national overhaul of the UHF table of allocations.

WMCV was not built for another two years. In 1968, however, activity increased with the construction of studios and a transmitter facility on 38th Avenue North. There had been turnover in investors in the intervening years, with new investors including congressman Richard Fulton and secretary of state Joe C. Carr, but the station continued to promise a series of new local programs, including a dance show and professional wrestling produced in the studios. The station began broadcasting on August 5. WMCV owned a mobile production unit, the "Jolly Green Giant", which allowed it to produce the first regular local telecasts of high school basketball games. Channel 17 also brought viewers such local programs as auto racing from the Nashville Fairgrounds Speedway, interviews with visiting celebrity athletes on Celebrities and Sports, the first regular coverage of Tennessee State University and Fisk University sports, and all-night movies.

However, two and a half years after WMCV began telecasting, Music City Video entered into financial difficulties. It announced it would leave the air on March 14, 1971, for what it hoped would be a period of no longer than 90 days to reorganize or find new investors. Instead of finding new investors and returning to the air, it filed for bankruptcy protection in May 1971 and was adjudicated bankrupt in January 1973. A receiver was appointed and became the licensee.

=== The "Total Local Television" that was not ===
On July 9, 1973, a bankruptcy court approved the sale of the WMCV license and some office furniture to the Hudson Broadcasting Corporation, a company owned by local radio executive Bob Hudson. The purchase held the prospect of ensuring the station's place in television history; if he put WMCV back on the air, it would be the first Black-owned television station in the United States. While Hudson promised to return channel 17 to use by January 1974 and later by June, the FCC did not approve the transaction until July 31, 1974, conditioning approval on a return to service within 90 days.

The call letters on the permit were changed to WTLT, for "Total Local Television", on September 6. Hudson had previously promised that the station would serve the entire community with a special emphasis on minority issues and also on training minorities for careers in broadcasting, later describing his program lineup as "60 percent Black-oriented, 40 percent other". Work also began on updating equipment, with color cameras being ordered to replace the black-and-white units that WMCV used. The studio also needed attention; when Hudson's team first entered, they found cigar and cigarette butts on the floor, coffee cups untouched since 1971, and a half-opened letter.

Hudson's dream, however, ran into unexpected trouble. WTLT was able to broadcast test patterns in February 1975, and programming and staff had been secured, but Hudson Broadcasting was unable to assemble the capital necessary to begin full-time operations of the station, owing to an ongoing recession, high interest rates, and the unwillingness of banks to support a new speculative television venture. In July 1975, the entire facility was put up for sale, with Bob Hudson telling The Tennessean that his firm was "in the right place at the wrong time".

=== WZTV: The independent years ===
Hudson Broadcasting announced the sale of WTLT to Reel Broadcasting Corporation, a company headed by Robert K. Zelle, in August 1975. The FCC granted approval on September 30, and the sale closed in early November, with new WZTV call letters selected nearly immediately. After months of construction and equipment delays, WZTV began broadcasting again on March 6, 1976. The program lineup included several professional and college sports packages, syndicated shows, and movies. The first program aired was a local show, a game show titled Beat the Bidders and taped at Opryland USA. Equally noteworthy was its executive team, which included Michael Thompson—later an owner of independent television stations in Tennessee—as vice president and station manager and general manager Ian "Sandy" Wheeler, who would later start Family Group Broadcasting.

In December 1978, Reel Broadcasting agreed to sell WZTV to Multimedia, Inc., whose television station holdings consisted of network affiliates in the Midwest and South. While WZTV would be the group's only independent, it would be part of a larger Multimedia operation in the city. The company published the monthly Music City News, covering Nashville's country music industry, and it was interested in building a Nashville presence for the production and syndication of country music TV programs. The $7 million sale was not approved until January 1980 and completed in March.

Multimedia's ownership tenure was one of growth for the station. By 1982, the company was attempting to secure additional space for WZTV's operations beyond the increasingly cramped 38th Avenue North plant; as a temporary move, administrative and sales staff were moved into a downtown office building in the MetroCenter area. In addition, the station improved its technical facilities by agreeing to lease space on WSMV-TV's tower. WZTV was also the television home of Nashville Sounds baseball from 1982 to 1991, and from 1986 to 1989 and again in 1991, it was the television home of Vanderbilt Commodores football.

At the same time, a market in which WZTV had been the only independent station suddenly turned competitive. In the span of four months, WFYZ (channel 39) started from Murfreesboro on December 30, 1983, and WCAY-TV (channel 30), owned by TVX Broadcast Group, debuted on February 18, 1984. WFYZ was purchased by Hudson and renamed WHTN in 1985, but it lost money, went off the air in April 1986, and returned the next month in the process of being sold to the Christian Television Network.

In 1987, Multimedia announced a commitment to build a new facility in MetroCenter that would end the split of its staff between two offices. By 1988, Multimedia's Nashville-based entertainment division was producing and syndicating the Music City News Awards telecast from the Grand Ole Opry and Christmas specials with the Statler Brothers.

In 1988, Multimedia sold WZTV to Act III Broadcasting, a company owned by Norman Lear. The sale moved WZTV from Multimedia, which owned no other independents, to a broadcasting company that specialized in running such stations. The sale included WZTV as well as the Nashville division of Multimedia, an archive of 4,000 programs, and Multimedia's music publishing business; Act III described WZTV as its "flagship station" after the purchase. Most of the program archive, consisting of programs produced between 1968 and 1982 by Showbiz Productions, was sold to Willie Nelson the next year for a proposed cable channel, The Cowboy Network. Act III also completed the relocation to the Mainstream site in early 1989.

Meanwhile, in 1986, WCAY-TV had affiliated with the newly launched Fox network. However, the station initially did not get a substantial ratings boost and continued to trail WZTV in the ratings. Two years later, WCAY was purchased by MT Communications—the MT standing for the same Michael Thompson that had been WZTV's vice president in 1976—and became WXMT in 1989. However, WXMT's Fox affiliation agreement contained a clause allowing the network to review its affiliation after one year of the station being sold. As Fox was known to prefer to affiliate with the top-rated independent in a market, speculation arose as to how long WXMT could maintain the Fox affiliation in Nashville. It was also becoming apparent that the Nashville market was not large enough for what were essentially two directly competing independent stations—at the time, Fox stations were still generally considered independents. Additionally, Act III openly coveted the Fox affiliation. Act III vice president Bert Ellis stated in 1989 that "we bought ZTV figuring it would eventually get a Fox affiliation", even though Fox's vice president of affiliate relations for the central region characterized such a move as "very unlikely".

=== As a Fox affiliate ===
On February 6, 1990, after negotiations that had been in progress for a week, Act III acquired the Nashville Fox affiliation and the vast majority of WXMT's programming inventory from MT Communications. With immediate effect, Fox programming, The Disney Afternoon, Cincinnati Reds baseball, and syndicated programs including The Arsenio Hall Show and Star Trek: The Next Generation moved to WZTV; WXMT maintained some children's programs and filled much of its air time with the Home Shopping Network. The deal also made Act III the largest owner of Fox affiliates in the United States, with seven. Nashville became the first of four markets, all in the South, where Fox moved its affiliation during 1990; of the other three, two (Little Rock, Arkansas, and Memphis) involved ex-TVX stations. It also became the third city in which Act III purchased much of another station's programming inventory, having previously done so at stations in Richmond, Virginia, and Buffalo, New York. Less than a year earlier, in July 1989, MT Communications had offered to purchase WZTV's programming inventory, a deal that fell apart late in negotiations.

WZTV was almost affected by an affiliation switch in 1994. New World Communications, a company looking to acquire WSMV-TV, agreed on May 23, 1994, to affiliate most of its stations with Fox, setting off what turned into a multi-year national affiliation realignment. WZTV would have had to find a new affiliation, such as NBC, which Fox would have displaced on WSMV-TV. New World continued to negotiate to acquire WSMV-TV, but despite being described as a near-done deal, talks fell apart, leaving the affiliation status quo in place in Nashville.

In 1995, Act III was acquired by ABRY Broadcast Partners; the Boston buyout firm named Dan Sullivan, president of the TV division of Clear Channel Communications, to run Sullivan Broadcasting, a joint venture with ABRY to manage the former Act III portfolio. The next year, Sullivan Broadcasting entered into a local marketing agreement—with an option to buy—to run most of the operations of WXMT, by then a UPN affiliate (renamed WUXP-TV later that year), concurrent with Mission Broadcasting acquiring WXMT's license assets. In addition, under Sullivan, WZTV began airing its first local newscast.

In 1998, Sinclair Broadcast Group acquired Sullivan Broadcasting, including WZTV and its agreement to manage WUXP-TV. The deal made the company the largest owner of Fox affiliates outside of the network.

On September 20, 2021, WZTV's second digital subchannel became Nashville's affiliate of The CW, inheriting the programming that had been on Sinclair-managed WNAB.

== Local programming ==
=== News operation ===
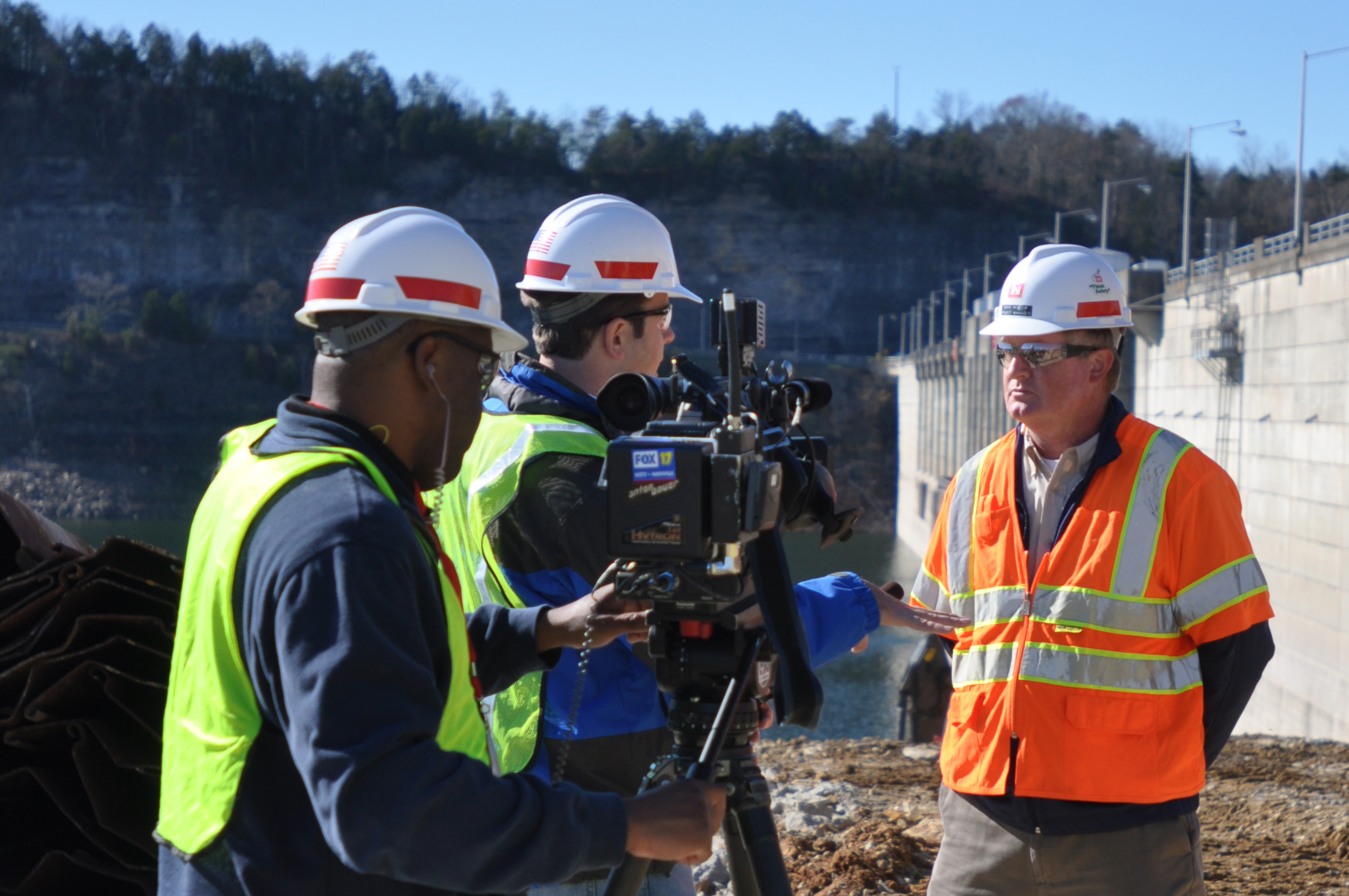
WZTV reporter John Dunn interviews a project manager at the Wolf Creek Dam in 2011

In the 1990s, Fox began to encourage its affiliates to develop local news programs. In response, in 1997, WZTV began hiring anchors and reporters to produce a 9 p.m. newscast in collaboration with Nashville ABC affiliate WKRN-TV. WKRN-TV would not produce the newscast, but it did provide studio space, equipment, and some news stories. Fox News @ Nine began airing on July 7, 1997; notable among the initial hires was news anchor Ashley Webster, later of the Fox Business Network. It was the first full newscast in the time slot in Nashville since the WSMV-produced The Scene at 9 aired on WXMT from 1992 to 1994. Weekend newscasts were initially not included in the agreement, but six months later, on January 4, 1998, the station began airing Sunday night newscasts in response to the popularity of lead-in The X-Files.

The program remained a half-hour in length until July 6, 2000, when WZTV brought news production in-house and expanded it to an hour. Sinclair invested $3 million and increased WZTV's own news staff from six to 43 people.

In September 2001, WZTV expanded its local programming with a new, entertainment-oriented morning show, originally titled Mornings with Ralph Emery and later Tennessee Mornings; the program became a radio simulcast with WLAC in 2004 and expanded to two hours. By 2013, when the program was relaunched and retitled Fox 17 This Morning, it had grown to four hours. A 4:30 a.m. half-hour was added in 2014 alongside a 5:30 p.m. newscast competing against network newscasts on the ABC, CBS, and NBC affiliates.

=== Sports programming ===
In 2003, WZTV began producing and airing Titans All Access, a weekly half-hour program during football season covering the activities of the Tennessee Titans.

== Technical information ==
=== Subchannels ===
WZTV's transmitter is located along I-24 in Whites Creek. The station's signal is multiplexed:

Subchannels of WZTV
Subchannel	Res.	Short name	Programming
17.1	720p	FOX17	Fox
17.2	720p	CW	The CW
17.3	480i	Antenna	Antenna TV (4:3)
17.4	480i	TCN	True Crime Network
30.2	480i	Quest	Quest (WUXP-TV) (4:3)

Broadcast on behalf of another station

WZTV hosts a subchannel of WUXP-TV as part of the ATSC 3.0 deployment plan for Nashville, in which WUXP-TV and WNAB broadcast several local stations (including WZTV) in 3.0 format.

=== Analog-to-digital conversion ===
WZTV shut down its analog signal, over UHF channel 17, on February 17, 2009, which was intended to be the official date on which full-power television stations in the United States transitioned from analog to digital broadcasts under federal mandate. The deadline was moved to June 12, 2009, but the station decided to convert on the original deadline. The station's digital signal remained on its pre-transition UHF channel 15, using virtual channel 17.
