= WKRN-TV =

Television station in Nashville, Tennessee

- Nashville, Tennessee; United States
- Channels: Digital: 27 (UHF); Virtual: 2
- Branding: News 2

Programming
- Affiliations: 2.1: ABC; for others, see § Subchannels

Ownership
- Owner: Nexstar Media Group; (Nexstar Media Inc.)

History
- First air date: November 29, 1953
- Former call signs: WSIX-TV (1953–1973); WNGE (1973–1983)
- Former channel number: Analog: 8 (VHF, 1953–1973), 2 (VHF, 1973–2009)
- Former affiliations: CBS (1953–1954); ABC (secondary, 1953–1954)
- Call sign meaning: "Knight Ridder-Nashville"

Technical information
- Licensing authority: FCC
- Facility ID: 73188
- ERP: 1,000 kW
- HAAT: 411 m (1,348 ft)
- Transmitter coordinates: 36°2′50″N 86°49′49″W

Links
- Public license information: Public file; LMS
- Website: www.wkrn.com

WKRN-TV (channel 2) is a television station in Nashville, Tennessee, United States, affiliated with ABC and owned by Nexstar Media Group. The station's studios are located on Murfreesboro Road (U.S. Routes 41 and 70S) on Nashville's southeast side, and its transmitter is located in Forest Hills, Tennessee.

== History ==
=== The early years on channel 8 as WSIX-TV ===
The station first signed on the air on November 29, 1953, as WSIX-TV, broadcasting on VHF channel 8; it was the second television station in Nashville. WSIX-TV was originally licensed to WSIX, Inc., which was owned by Louis and Jack Draughon, along with WSIX (980 AM). Initially licensed to nearby Springfield, WSIX radio was launched on January 7, 1927, and based in the Draughon brothers' 638 Tire and Vulcanizing Company auto supply business in downtown Springfield. The "638" was the auto supply business' mailing address and did not allude to the assigned frequency for the radio station, nor would it for the television station. The station's original studio facilities were located on Old Hickory Boulevard, south of Nashville at the transmitter site, which was shared with WSIX-FM.

Originally a CBS affiliate that shared the ABC affiliation with WSM-TV (channel 4, now WSMV), it became a full-time ABC affiliate after only one year when WLAC-TV (channel 5, now WTVF) signed on and took the CBS affiliation due to WLAC radio's long history as a CBS radio affiliate. During the late 1950s, the station was also briefly affiliated with the NTA Film Network. In 1961, WSIX-AM-FM-TV moved to a new studio located at 441 Murfreesboro Road, where the television station remains located today.

The current WKRN studio facility is where the Wilburn Brothers' television program was produced during the 1960s and 1970s (however, WSM-TV had the rights to air the show in the Nashville market). WSIX-TV, however, did not have much luck against WSM-TV and WLAC-TV. Part of the problem was a weak signal, as its transmitter was short-spaced to channel 8 in Atlanta – occupied first by WSB-TV (currently occupied by WGTV). WSIX-TV was also hampered by a weaker network affiliation (ABC was not truly competitive with CBS and NBC until well into the 1970s).

=== Channel swap of 1973 and the General Electric years ===
December 1973 ad announcing the move of WNGE's channel allocation from channel 8 to channel 2.

The Draughons sold the WSIX stations to General Electric in 1966. In 1973, GE agreed to a deal with Nashville's PBS member station, WDCN-TV (now WNPT), then on channel 2, to swap frequencies. GE participated in the channel trade because the analog channel 2 facility was better suited for a network affiliate as opposed to a non-commercial educational station. The swap occurred on December 11, 1973, at 9 pm, in the middle of prime time programming, between that night's Movie of the Week, The Cat Creature, and Marcus Welby, M.D.. At the same time, the station's calls were switched to WNGE (for "Nashville's General Electric") to emphasize both a fresh start on channel 2, and to end any confusion (especially for those households with Nielsen diaries) regarding call letters which never resided on channel 6 (WSIX-FM and AM remained unchanged). This was only the third facility swap in American television history.

In 1979, General Electric almost filed to sell WNGE to Nashville Television Inc., a subsidiary of North Carolina Mutual Life Insurance Company during a proposed General Electric merger with Cox Broadcasting, with its new group being led by president William J. Kennedy, for $25 million, but the deal apparently fell through due to a lack of Federal Communications Commission approval.

=== As WKRN-TV ===
General Electric pared down its broadcasting holdings during the early 1980s (possibly in preparation for its purchase of then-NBC parent company RCA in late 1985), selling WNGE to Knight Ridder Newspapers in 1983. The new owners changed the calls on November 29 to the current WKRN-TV. Knight Ridder sold off all of its television stations in 1989, at which point channel 2 (along with its sibling WTEN in Albany, New York, which Knight Ridder purchased in 1977) was sold to Young Broadcasting. Merely by coincidence, the call letters reflect the former Young Broadcasting flagship outlet, KRON-TV in San Francisco.

Like all other ABC affiliates that were owned by Young Broadcasting, WKRN preempted ABC's broadcast of the movie Saving Private Ryan in 2004.

On June 6, 2013, Media General announced that it would acquire Young Broadcasting in an all-stock deal. The merger was completed on November 12, 2013, resulting in WKRN and its Knoxville sister station WATE-TV becoming sister stations of Johnson City-based WJHL-TV.

However, less than two years after that merger was finalized, the station's ownership appeared as though it was once again put into flux, as on September 8, 2015, Media General announced that it would acquire the Meredith Corporation for $2.4 billion, with the combined group to be renamed Meredith Media General once the sale was finalized. Because Meredith already owned WSMV, and the two stations rank among the four highest-rated stations in the Nashville market in total day viewership, the companies would have been required to sell either WSMV or WKRN to comply with FCC ownership rules as well as recent changes to those rules regarding same-market television stations that restrict sharing agreements.

The overlap issue was later rendered moot as the deal collapsed, and on January 27, 2016, it was announced that Nexstar Media Group would acquire Media General for $4.6 billion. The sale was completed on January 17, 2017.

== Subchannel history ==
=== WKRN-DT2 ===
WKRN-DT2 is the Ion Mystery–affiliated second digital subchannel of WKRN-TV, broadcasting in standard definition on channel 2.2).

==== As Nashville WX Channel ====
WKRN launched the subchannel in 2008 as a local 24-hour weather channel for the Nashville area. It was branded on-air as the "Nashville Weather Channel", but stylized as the "Nashville WX Channel". The subchannel also simulcast the main channel's wall-to-wall severe weather coverage when a tornado warning was issued for any part of WKRN's coverage area. The Channel was somewhat of a locally oriented version of the AccuWeather channel, except that it implemented a backward L bar for its screen orientation, with an information crawl on the bottom of the screen. It provided pre-recorded weather segments produced by the WKRN Weather Team, and it featured radar imagery, the current time, temperature, and precipitation count in the Downtown Nashville area. This subchannel was also ad-supported, for commercials were shown between a replay of the taped weather segments, and the next time they showed the weather slides with music in the background. Like the digital weather channels of other stations formerly owned by Young Broadcasting, the channel was produced in-house with no outside assistance from any national services (such as The Local AccuWeather Channel) and is fully automated using the station's weather computers. This format was similar to that of WBAY-DT2, the local weather-oriented second subchannel of Green Bay, Wisconsin area ABC affiliate WBAY-TV, then one of WKRN's sister stations.

In addition, some syndicated programming aired on this channel, most notably on Sunday mornings where E/I programming was offered through syndication, mainly including Canadian-imported syndicated show, Edgemont. The syndicated version of Storm Stories was also shown on WKRN-DT2 on weeknights at 7 pm. CT. Both Edgemont and Storm Stories were discontinued a month before WKRN-DT2 switched to the MeTV affiliation.

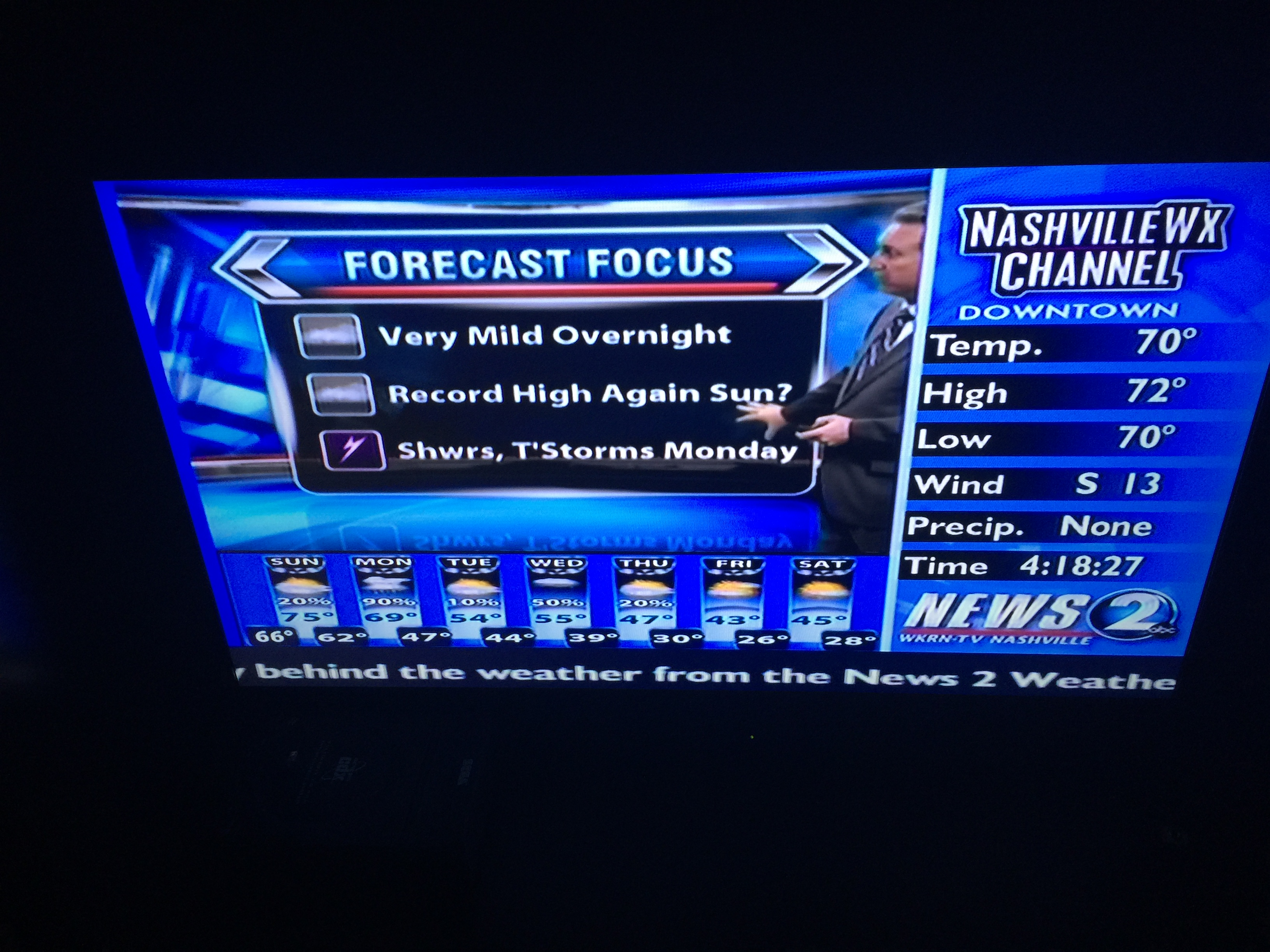
Nashville WX Channel on December 27, 2015.

It previously showed Atlantic Coast Conference basketball and football games from Raycom Sports from 2012 until late August 2014, when MyNetworkTV affiliate WUXP took over those rights for the purpose to serve as a replacement for the syndicated Southeastern Conference football and basketball packages by ESPN Plus-produced SEC TV (those were previously provided by Jefferson-Pilot/Raycom Sports until 2009), which were discontinued because of the launch of the new cable-exclusive SEC Network.

In 2014, a Wikipedia user listed WKRN-DT2 as an affiliate of WeatherNation TV, but it never aired programming from that network. WZTV-DT2, the second subchannel of local Fox affiliate WZTV (channel 17), became a WeatherNation affiliate in November 2014.

WKRN-DT2's programming was simulcast on WKRN-DT3, beginning on May 30, 2015, when the Live Well Network (which was previously broadcast on WKRN-DT3) ceased national distribution outside of ABC's owned-and-operated stations. This ended on December 30, 2015, when WKRN added Justice Network (now True Crime Network) to the third subchannel.

==== MeTV affiliation ====
It was reported that WKRN-DT2 would affiliate with MeTV, and did so at the stroke of midnight on February 1, 2016, replacing The Nashville WX Channel. MeTV was first carried on low-power station WJDE-LD on 31.1 from 2012 until 2016. WJDE also carried all of MeTV's programming full time, since that station did not broadcast any local programming whatsoever. Since WJDE signed on in 1986, it carried the full-time satellite feed of the Home Shopping Network, before it switched to MeTV in 2012. At the same time on February 1, 2016, when WKRN-DT2 switched from the Nashville WX Channel to carry MeTV, WJDE-LD's main channel switched from MeTV to Heroes & Icons.

Until January 1, 2018, WKRN-DT2 was the default MeTV affiliate for viewers in at least the southern half of the Bowling Green, Kentucky market area who can receive the signal. In spite of WKRN-DT2 being the closest MeTV outlet, Louisville CBS affiliate WLKY, along with its main channel, was carried on the South Central Rural Telephone Cooperative cable system, which serves cable subscribers in the Caveland area of Barren, Metcalfe, and Hart counties. This ended on January 1, 2018, when Bowling Green-area NBC primary/CBS subchannel-only affiliate WNKY launched their third subchannel to carry the entire MeTV schedule.

==== Bounce TV affiliation ====
In September 2019, WKRN started running advertisements on WKRN-DT2 stating that the subchannel would switch to Bounce TV on September 23, with MeTV moving to WJFB (channel 44.1). A WKRN spokesperson stated the decision was made "at the corporate level." WKRN-DT2 officially switched from MeTV to Bounce TV at the stroke of midnight on September 23, 2019. Bounce TV continued to be seen on low-powered station WLLC-LP 42.3 until December 2, when it was replaced with AMGTV.

=== WKRN-DT3 ===
On August 26, 2012, WKRN began carrying the Live Well Network on its third digital subchannel. Originally announced to launch on July 18, 2012, LWN's carriage on the new subchannel was part of an agreement announced in January 2012, between Young Broadcasting and Live Well Network in which the network will be carried as a digital multicast service on Young-owned stations in seven markets. Live Well Network was scheduled to be shut down in January 2015, but ABC decided to continue broadcasting the Live Well Network for an estimated two to three months beyond the reported January 15, 2015, shutdown date. On May 29, 2015, Comcast reported that they had been informed by Media General that as of May 30, 2015, Media General would discontinue carrying Live Well Network on their channels, including WKRN. On May 30, 2015, WKRN began broadcasting the Nashville WX Channel on WKRN-DT3, the same feed as they carry on WKRN-DT2. On December 30, 2015, WKRN began broadcasting The Justice Network on WKRN-DT3. As of December 1, 2024, it switched to Defy.

== Programming ==
=== Sports programming ===
WKRN-TV has an agreement with the Tennessee Titans to broadcast Bridgestone Titans on 2, the team's coach's show that originally aired from 8 to 9 p.m. on Tuesdays, preempting ABC programming in that timeslot during the NFL season (which featured low-rated and critically derided sitcoms for the majority of the 2000s). The show now airs Mondays and Saturdays at 6:30 pm, preempting Wheel of Fortune in that timeslot during football season. It moved to that timeslot after viewer criticism during the early episodes first season of the 2009 series V where it was pushed to late Tuesday evenings one week, then to a day-and-date airing on WKRN-DT2 the next. WKRN's then-sister station in Green Bay, WBAY-TV, also faced the same situation with a locally produced football program covering the Green Bay Packers, but after a week moved that program to air before prime time to accommodate V (later affiliation agreements eventually made preempting programming in this manner impossible outside breaking news and severe weather situations).

WKRN is also the flagship station of the Tennessee Titans Preseason Television Network, which broadcasts Titans preseason football games during August. These games often prompt WKRN to broadcast the night's ABC prime time programming on a tape delay in the overnight hours of the following morning.

Since 2006, WKRN also simulcasts ESPN's Monday Night Football any time the Tennessee Titans are involved in a Monday night match-up during the regular season whenever it does not conflict with an ABC broadcast of a Monday night game whenever two games are played, in which case, WZTV would simulcast the ESPN telecast of the Titans game while WKRN airs the ABC-exclusive game.

=== News operation ===
WKRN broadcasts 45 1/2 hours of locally produced newscasts each week (with 7 1/2 hours each weekday and four hours each on Saturdays and Sundays). In addition, the station produces a half-hour public affairs program, This Week with Bob Mueller, which airs Sundays at 11 pm. WKRN is the only Big Three network affiliate in Nashville that does not run an hour-long newscast at 6 pm, although its early evening newscasts on weekdays begin at 4 pm, including ABC World News Tonight at 5:30 p.m.

Before the advent of satellite technology in the 1980s, the Vanderbilt Television News Archive taped all ABC News broadcasts from the airwaves of WSIX/WNGE/WKRN. Some of the recordings prior to that time include local cut-ins to ABC coverage of national elections, which represent the only preservations of the station's news broadcasts of that time; a 1979 recording of a late night ABC News broadcast also included the station's signoff sequence.

On October 11, 2011, WKRN began broadcasting its local newscasts in high definition, becoming the last Nashville television station to make the upgrade. This included a brand new news set that was built in a separate studio that was based on a design shared by all Young stations that have upgraded to HD, replacing the "working newsroom" set that had been used for the newscasts since 1986.

On March 29, 2014, WKRN added an additional hour of newscasts on both Saturday and Sunday mornings beginning at 5 a.m.

On September 8, 2023, WKRN became the market's second station to debut a 3 p.m. newscast.

== Technical information ==
=== Subchannels ===
The station's signal is multiplexed:

Subchannels of WKRN-TV
| Subchannel | Res. | Short name | Programming |
|---|---|---|---|
| 2.1 | 720p | WKRN-DT | ABC |
| 2.2 | 480i | MYSTERY | Ion Mystery |
| 2.3 | 480i | DEFY | Defy |
| 2.4 | 480i | 365BLK | 365BLK |
| 30.1 | 720p | WUXP-MY | MyNetworkTV (WUXP-TV) |

Broadcast on behalf of another station

=== Analog-to-digital conversion ===
WKRN's former logo, which had been used (with minor modifications) from 1998 until 2016. Variants of the "Circle 2" had been used since 1981 (this particular variation was first seen in 1994).

WKRN shut down its analog signal over VHF channel 2 on June 12, 2009, the official date on which full-power television stations in the United States transitioned from analog to digital broadcasts under federal mandate. The station's digital signal remained on its pre-transition UHF channel 27, using virtual channel 2.

== Cable carriage ==
WKRN is available to every Middle Tennessee cable provider, including Xfinity channels 2 (SD) and 1002 (HD). Those channel allocations also apply to U-verse. WKRN is also available on Charter Spectrum channels 2 (SD) and 702 (HD).

In Clarksville, it is available to subscribers of CDE Lightband Cable channels 2 (SD) and 902 (HD). WKRN is also available on Mediacom and Charter in the Hopkinsville, Kentucky, area.

== Out-of-market coverage ==
=== Southern Kentucky ===
Due to Nashville's close proximity to the Bowling Green area, WKRN's over-the-air (OTA) signal can be picked up in some areas of the Bowling Green media market, the home territory to fellow ABC affiliate WBKO (channel 13). WKRN's signal can reach as far north as an area along the Green River in areas just north of Bowling Green.

As with the other "Big Three" Nashville stations, WKRN also has had presence in southern Kentucky, even after Arbitron collapsed Bowling Green into its own media market in 1977 because of WBKO's success and growth, thus putting WSIX-TV/WNGE/WKRN in competition with WBKO for viewing allegiances in southern Kentucky. From 1967 until 1981, channel 13 (as WLTV at the time of its initial affiliation deal with ABC) relied on reception of WSIX-TV/WNGE/WKRN's signal through off-air reception and/or a private microwave link to air ABC programming as that station did not receive network programming through the satellite feed at the time. Before WLTV affiliated with ABC, WSIX-TV's 1966 application for the construction permit for a low-power translator on the south side of Bowling Green was approved in December of that year; those plans were since cancelled once WLTV's ABC affiliation was announced. WKRN-TV was dropped from cable systems in Bowling Green in 1998 to make room for WBWG, a WBKO-operated cable-only WB affiliate as part of The WB 100+ Station Group, which has since relaunched over-the-air as CW Plus affiliate WBKO-DT3 in 2006.

In addition to the Bowling Green area, WKRN was also previously available on CATV in Glasgow, the Barren County seat, via the Glasgow Electric Plant Board. This ended during the 2000s as more of their customers watched WBKO than WKRN as subscribers preferred news from within Kentucky over news from an out-of-state outlet; this was also due to part of controversial issues that occurred concerning the carriage of both stations. WKRN was permanently dropped from the Glasgow EPB's channel lineup in 2003 because WBKO wanted to be the sole ABC affiliate to be carried. However, WHAS-TV, the ABC affiliate in Louisville, is still available on that system as a backup ABC affiliate if one or the other preempts network programming for severe weather coverage, but carriage of both stations on the system is subject to the FCC's syndication exclusivity rules.

=== Lincoln County, Tennessee ===
WKRN was carried on Fayetteville Public Utilities' cable system in the Fayetteville, Tennessee, area in Lincoln County, the only Middle Tennessee county that is considered to be in the Huntsville, Alabama media market. This ended on December 31, 2021, when WAAY-TV claimed market exclusivity.

=== Northern Alabama ===
From 1957 through the 1970s and 1980s, WKRN, along with WSMV, WTVF, and eventually independent station WZTV (now a Fox affiliate), was also available on CATV systems in other areas of the Huntsville media market in northern Alabama, including TelePrompter (later Group W Cable, now Comcast) and Knology (now WOW!). They were eventually dropped as more national cable channels were launched throughout the mid- and late 1980s.

| Preceded by None | Channel 8 Nashville occupant 1953–1973 | Succeeded by WNPT |
| Preceded by WDCN-TV (now WNPT) | Channel 2 Nashville occupant 1973–present | Succeeded by Incumbent |
