= WSMV-TV =

Television station in Nashville, Tennessee

- Nashville, Tennessee; United States
- Channels: Digital: 10 (VHF); Virtual: 4
- Branding: WSMV 4

Programming
- Affiliations: 4.1: NBC; for others, see § Subchannels

Ownership
- Owner: Gray Media; (Gray Television Licensee, LLC)
- Sister stations: WFET-LD, WTNX-LD

History
- First air date: September 30, 1950
- Former call signs: WSM-TV (1950–1981)
- Former channel numbers: Analog: 4 (VHF, 1950–2009)
- Former affiliations: All secondary: CBS (1950–1953); ABC (1950–1954); DuMont (1950–1956)
- Call sign meaning: "We Shield Millions" ("V" for "Vision" added to differentiate from WSM radio)

Technical information
- Licensing authority: FCC
- Facility ID: 41232
- ERP: 60 kW
- HAAT: 413 m (1,355 ft)
- Transmitter coordinates: 36°8′27″N 86°51′56″W
- Translator(s): see § Translators

Links
- Public license information: Public file; LMS
- Website: wsmv.com

WSMV-TV (channel 4) is a television station in Nashville, Tennessee, United States, affiliated with NBC. It is owned by Gray Media alongside low-power Telemundo affiliate WTNX-LD (channel 29). The two stations share studios on Knob Road in west Nashville, where WSMV-TV's transmitter is also located.

== History ==
=== Early years ===
WSMV first signed on the air as WSM-TV on September 30, 1950, at 1:10 p.m. CT. It was Nashville's first television station and the second in Tennessee, behind fellow NBC affiliate WMCT (now sister station WMC-TV, then also on channel 4) in Memphis. As a result of the WSM-TV sign-on, WMCT was forced to switch to channel 5 to avoid co-channel interference. WSM-TV was owned by WSM, Inc., a subsidiary of the locally based National Life and Accident Insurance Company, which also owned WSM radio (650 AM) and the original WSM-FM (103.3; shut down in 1951); the AM station is renowned for broadcasts of the country music show The Grand Ole Opry, which has been heard on the station since 1925. The station took its call letters from its parent's slogan, "We Shield Millions".

The television station has been an NBC affiliate from its sign-on, although it also carried some programming from CBS, DuMont, and ABC. Its secondary affiliation with CBS ended in 1953, when WSIX-TV (channel 8, now WKRN-TV on channel 2) signed on as a primary CBS affiliate. WSM-TV shared ABC programming with WSIX-TV for a year until WLAC-TV (channel 5, now WTVF) signed on in 1954 as the market's new primary CBS affiliate, leaving WSIX-TV to take the ABC affiliation. In the late 1950s, the station also shared a short-lived affiliation with the NTA Film Network with WSIX-TV by airing one of its programs, Sheriff of Cochise. During the first few years of operation, AT&T would not run telephone lines for WSM-TV to receive network programming until there was another TV station in town. This problem was solved by the station running a private microwave relay transmission from fellow NBC affiliate and now sister station WAVE-TV in Louisville, Kentucky; this was the longest privately-operated microwave relay link at the time.

WSM-TV's studios were originally located at 15th Avenue South and Compton Avenue in south Nashville, near the present Belmont University. In 1957, the station attempted to a build a larger tower in west Nashville, near Charlotte Avenue. During the construction process, the new tower's supporting wires failed. This caused the tower to collapse, which took the lives of several people. Afterward, WSM-TV purchased its present property on Knob Road (farther west than the previous site, and allowable since WMCT in Memphis had switched to channel 5 from channel 4) and built a tower there in a forested section away from potential damage to life and property.

=== Growth into the 1960s and 1970s ===
For a brief period, WSM-TV shared its broadcast facilities with non-commercial station WDCN-TV (channel 2, now WNPT on channel 8) when that station signed on in 1962. In 1963, National Life and Accident Insurance built new studios for WSM-TV and its AM radio sister station adjacent to the transmission tower on Knob Road. This left WDCN-TV as the sole occupant of the south Nashville building, where that station remained until 1976. WSM-TV was the first station in Nashville to begin broadcasting in color in 1965. In 1974, NL&AI reorganized itself as a holding company, NLT Corporation, with the WSM stations (by then including a new WSM-FM at 95.5) as a major subsidiary.

=== Ownership changes ===
Beginning in 1980, Houston-based insurer American General—which owned the WLAC stations until 1975—began purchasing blocks of NLT stock, eventually becoming NLT's largest shareholder and setting the stage for an outright takeover. However, American General was not interested in NLT's non-insurance businesses. It opted to sell off the broadcasting interests, the Grand Ole Opry, the then-decrepit Ryman Auditorium, and the now-defunct Opryland USA. Gillett Broadcasting (operated by George N. Gillett Jr.) bought WSM-TV on November 3, 1981, and changed the station's callsign to WSMV on the same day (officially modified to WSMV-TV on July 15, 1982). The new callsign allowed channel 4 to continue trading on the well-known WSM calls while at the same time separating it from its former radio sisters. The change was brought on due to an FCC rule in place at that time forbidding TV and radio stations in the same city but with different owners from sharing the same call letters. However, channel 4 would later engage in news department cross promotions with WSM-AM-FM.

Gaylord Entertainment Company purchased the remainder of WSM, Inc. nearly two years later, in 1983. Soon afterward, the radio stations moved out of the Knob Road facility into new studios on the Opryland Hotel campus.

WSMV-TV was sold on June 8, 1989, to Cook Inlet Television Partners, an Alaska-based company which was a subsidiary of Cook Inlet Region, Inc., an Alaska Native Regional Corporation.

=== Meredith Corporation ownership ===
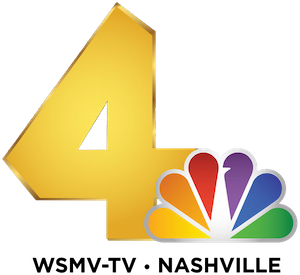
WSMV's former logo, variations of which have been used since its introduction in 1978. This particular variation was first seen in 1994 and would be used until May 2020, when the golden 4 would be retired.

This variation of the 4 logotype was introduced in May 2020 and would be displayed in either solid white or black, depending on the background contrast. The NBC Peacock was also rendered flat. Gray Television retired this logo in December 2023, when the company began the nationwide process of purging network logos from their affiliate stations' logos.

Cook Inlet sold WSMV on January 5, 1995, to the Meredith Corporation. WSMV was not part of the affiliation deal between several Meredith stations and CBS (which included Meredith's only other NBC affiliate at the time, WNEM-TV in Bay City, Michigan) because the purchase was announced after the affiliation deal had been finalized. As a result, WSMV became the only NBC affiliate in Meredith's portfolio until their 2021 sale.

In early March 2009, it was announced that WSMV's master control operations would be hubbed at Meredith-owned sister station WGCL-TV (now WANF) in Atlanta. The new hub operation launched in summer 2009.

On September 8, 2015, Media General announced that it would acquire Meredith for $2.4 billion, with the combined group to be renamed Meredith Media General. Because Media General owned WKRN-TV, and the two stations rank among the four highest-rated stations in the Nashville market in total day viewership, the companies would have been required to sell either WSMV-TV or WKRN to comply with FCC ownership rules as well as recent changes to those rules regarding same-market television stations that restrict sharing agreements. On January 27, 2016, Nexstar Broadcasting Group announced that it had reached an agreement to acquire Media General. This resulted in the termination of the acquisition of Meredith by Media General.

=== Sale to Gray Television ===
On May 3, 2021, Gray Television announced its intent to purchase the Meredith Local Media division for $2.7 billion. The sale was completed on December 1.

Gray also immediately changed the station's positioning from "News 4" to "WSMV 4" and implemented a new graphics scheme, resulting in the 4 logo switching from primarily black to primarily white. In 2022, the station launched a heavily localized imaging campaign, reviving the "Nashville's Station" nickname, and inviting viewers to "Come On Back" after years of ratings losses.

In December 2023, the NBC Peacock was removed from WSMV's logo as part of a company-wide initiative within Gray to strip network marks from station logos.

== Programming ==
=== Country music programming ===
The WSM stations' close ties to Nashville's country music business has meant that the Knob Road facility and/or its personnel was, from time to time, used for the recording of network and syndicated programs featuring Nashville-based performers. This was especially the case during the 1960s and 1970s. Most if not all of these shows were packaged by Show Biz, Inc., headquartered in Nashville and a subsidiary of Holiday Inn. Show Biz, Inc. produced The Porter Wagoner Show, That Nashville Music, The Bill Anderson Show, Dolly! and several other programs seen throughout the United States, especially on stations in the South and rural Midwest. The company dissolved in the late 1970s when its president, Jane Grams, became vice president and general manager of WTVC-TV in Chattanooga, Tennessee. However, the Show Biz programs were seen on some stations well into the early 1980s.

=== Sports programming ===
Since 2006, channel 4 airs any Sunday Night Football games that involve the market's NFL team, the Tennessee Titans. The station also aired Nashville Predators games via NBC's broadcast contract with the NHL that lasted until 2021; this includes the team's appearance in the 2017 Stanley Cup Finals.

From 1987 until March 2002, WSMV-TV was the primary Nashville home to syndicated Southeastern Conference football and men's basketball games (including those of the locally-based Vanderbilt Commodores) originating from Jefferson Pilot Sports, but sharing some broadcasts with WZTV (channel 17) from 1987 to 1990, and WXMT (channel 30, now MyNetworkTV affiliate WUXP) from 1990 onward. All of those games moved to WUXP in 2002, and stayed with that station until 2009, when Raycom Sports (now a subsidiary of Gray Media) lost the syndication rights to ESPN Regional Television. WUXP carried ESPN Plus-oriented SEC TV until 2014, when the SEC Network was launched. Several of these Raycom/JP broadcasts, through the station's DT2 subchannel, are rebroadcast on weekdays through the Tennessee Valley Sports and Entertainment Network, of which WSMV is the flagship. While originally under contract with Jefferson Pilot Sports for SEC games, the station often preempted NBC's broadcasts of Notre Dame Fighting Irish football games; in the event of those scheduling conflicts, WXMT/WUXP would carry the Notre Dame games.

=== Past programming preemptions and deferrals ===
In 1982, WSMV dropped the Tonight Show to air sitcom reruns such as Three's Company, Alice, Barney Miller, Family Ties, and Rosie. NBC was able to get the show on in Nashville on WNGE (now WKRN), which would later give the program to then-independent station (now Fox affiliate) WZTV. WSMV re-added The Tonight Show in January 1989.

In early 2006, WSMV attracted some attention by becoming the largest NBC affiliate in terms of market size to refuse to carry the controversial NBC show The Book of Daniel on its schedule, after the premiere episode. This action, along with that of several smaller affiliates in the Midwest and South, as well as low ratings, prompted NBC to cancel the series after only three episodes.

On October 26, 2014, WSMV accidentally preempted parts of the first half of the Manchester United–Chelsea Premier League match and instead aired Poppy Cat from the NBC Kids block. This triggered negative responses from social media.

=== News operation ===
WSMV-TV broadcasts 53 hours of locally produced newscasts each week (with nine hours each weekday and four hours each on Saturdays and Sundays); in regards to the number of hours devoted to news programming, it is currently the highest local newscast output among all broadcast television stations in the Nashville market.

WSM-TV's news department was the first in the United States to receive satellite photographs when it first used them in 1964. Beginning in the mid-1970s, WSM-TV developed a strong news division that, in the 1980s through the 1990s, won numerous regional and national awards (Peabody Awards among them) for in-depth and investigative reporting. Mike Kettenring was the news director for much of that period along with Alan Griggs and Al Tompkins. For most of the last two decades, WSMV has been a solid runner-up to WTVF in the Nashville ratings. Generally speaking, the station takes a softer approach to news than WTVF. The reverse was true in the 1980s, as WSMV earned awards for hard-hitting investigative stories, while WTVF took a more cautious approach. While WTVF usually leads the way in the city of Nashville itself, WSMV generally leads in Nashville's more conservative suburbs, as well as outlying rural parts of the market, many of whose residents recall readily the station's past association with WSM-AM. In recent years, however, ABC affiliate WKRN has steadily increased its ratings, particularly in the evening and late newscasts. In the November 2017 sweeps, WKRN passed WSMV as runner-up in the 5 p.m. and 6 p.m. newscasts, and tied WSMV for second place in the 10 p.m. newscast.

On March 5, 1973, the Vanderbilt Television News Archive, known for its vast archive of televised network news programs, recorded off the air of WSM-TV a special broadcast of Today aimed toward veterans of the Vietnam War returning home to the U.S. Two months later, on May 1, another broadcast of Today was recorded concerning the Watergate scandal. On both of these broadcasts, Pat Sajak, who had recently joined the WSM radio and TV staff, anchored the five-minute cut-in local newscasts. As it was not the general policy of the Archive to record special programs such as these or local Nashville programming, these probably represent the only known broadcasts of WSM-TV news before 1980 or so available for public viewing, prior to the widespread popularity of consumer-level video cassette recorders in the late 1970s. The only other ones were local cut-ins to NBC coverage of national elections. Because of the equipment at the time, though, the broadcasts were recorded in black and white. The Archive, prior to the advent of satellite technology in the 1980s, taped all NBC News broadcasts from the airwaves of WSM(V).

In September 1973, WSM-TV decided to fill the 6:30–7 p.m. time slot opened up by the Prime Time Access Rule in 1971 by expanding its 6 p.m. newscast to one hour. This has proven so successful that to this day WSMV programs a newscast from 6 to 7 p.m. (although it is now broken up into two 30-minute segments). Upon the success of the expanded 6 p.m. newscast on channel 4 (and after years of low-rated syndicated offerings in the 6:30 slot), WTVF followed suit in 1989 by expanding its 6 p.m. newscast to one hour. WSMV and WTVF are among the few stations in the Central Time Zone to run newscasts at 6:30 (stations elsewhere have attempted it since the 1970s with varying degrees of success). WKRN is the only traditional network affiliate in the Nashville market to run only a half-hour of news at 6 p.m., with Wheel of Fortune (hosted by former WSM personality Pat Sajak from 1981 to 2024) airing at 6:30.

In the 1982-83 winter season, WSMV introduced the Snowbird character, a scarf- and earmuff-wearing anthropomorphic penguin, as a brand for its weather-related school closing reports. Snowbird appears on-air in both animated and puppet form, the latter of which premiered in 1984. Snowbird reports are shown on the station primarily in the winter, but the branding is also used for unexpected school closings caused by other natural and man-made events, not necessarily limited to snow and ice. Due to the character's popularity, Snowbird serves as a year-round mascot for the station, with a six-foot (1.8 m)-tall costumed version making appearances at community events and station promotions. The station has also engaged in giving away Snowbird-themed apparel and tchotchkes as prizes during sweeps promotions. The Snowbird character has since been licensed to television stations in other markets, including WMC-TV in Memphis, WRCB in Chattanooga, WBOY-TV in Clarksburg, West Virginia, WTOV-TV in Steubenville, Ohio, all NBC affiliates, and since 2025, sister station WBKO in Bowling Green, Kentucky, an ABC affiliate.

During the May sweeps period that began on April 26, 2007, WSMV debuted its own news helicopter known as Air 4, becoming the second station in Nashville to do so (WTVF's news helicopter Sky 5 debuted a year earlier, in 2006). On September 15, 2008, beginning with the 5 p.m. newscast, WSMV became the second television station in Nashville (after WTVF) to begin broadcasting its local newscasts in high definition.

On May 26, 2011, WSMV debuted an hour-long 4 p.m. newscast, serving as a replacement for The Oprah Winfrey Show, which ended its 25-year run the day before; this came on the heels of the expansion of other non-news local programming such as More at Midday and Better Nashville, indicating a decreased reliance on syndicated programming. On January 25, 2014, WSMV was the first station to expand its weekend morning newscast to 5 a.m. in the Nashville TV market.

On July 17, 2017, WSMV changed its newscast branding from Channel 4 News to News 4. In January 2018, the station's news graphics and music were updated.

On August 18, 2022, it was reported that WSMV would drop all syndicated programming and air expanded newscasts and locally produced programming outside of network hours. On September 5, 2022, WSMV became the first station in Nashville to offer local news at 3 p.m., while also expanding its midday newscast to two hours, and moving Today in Nashville to 2 p.m., replacing the canceled Wendy Williams Show.

==== Past on-air staff ====
The station's former staff include Pat Sajak (announcer and weekend weatherman from 1974 to 1977), Robin Roberts (sports anchor and reporter from 1986 to 1988), John Tesh(news anchor from 1975 to 1976), John Seigenthaler Jr. (weekend anchor in the late 1980s) and Huell Howser (features reporter in the 1970s).

Ralph Emery, the longtime country music disc jockey on WSM radio for many years, hosted morning (and at times, afternoon) shows on channel 4 from the mid-1960s until 1993; for much of that time, The Ralph Emery Show was the highest-rated locally produced early morning shows on American television. Although the show included regular news briefs, its main focus was on general entertainment, including a heavy emphasis on live country music performed in studio. It featured acts by prominent country stars like Tex Ritter and current star Lorrie Morgan; also, the studio band consisted of top-notch Music Row session musicians. Emery would achieve widespread fame by hosting a national version of the show, entitled Nashville Now, weeknights on The Nashville Network from 1983 to 1993. Upon Emery's retirement, WSMV briefly produced a local version of NBC's Today to serve as a lead-in to the national show. As Nashville Today failed to live up to expectations, WSMV finally programmed full-scale newscasts in early mornings, becoming the last of the three major Nashville stations to do so.

Larry Munson, WSM-TV's sports director from 1956 to 1967 and later known as the play-by-play announcer for radio broadcasts of Georgia Bulldogs football (and, for a time, the NFL's Atlanta Falcons), created and hosted a long-running hunting and fishing show called The Rod & Gun Club. Paul Eells replaced Munson as sports director in 1967. Like his predecessor, Eells served as the voice of the Vanderbilt Commodores football team during his time at WSM. Eells left to become the sports director at KATV in Little Rock, Arkansas in 1978. There, he also served as radio play-by-play announcer for the Arkansas Razorbacks for 28 years until his death in 2006. Munson died in 2011.

Dan Miller was co-anchor of the main evening newscasts for nearly 40 years, except from August 1986 to March 1995. During this period, Miller spent time in Los Angeles as a news anchor at KCBS-TV, and as sidekick to friend and former WSM-TV colleague Pat Sajak on his short-lived CBS late-night talk show The Pat Sajak Show. Miller returned to WSMV in 1992 to host 5 O'Clock with Dan Miller, which ran from 1992 to 1993. Miller returned to anchoring duties for the evening newscasts in March 1995, and continued until his sudden death in 2009.

In 1974, Bill Hall joined the staff as a weather reporter and morning news anchor. He briefly worked as a weekend news anchor in 1976 before moving into his role leading the weather team in 1977. His unique style and personality made him one of Middle Tennessee's most well known local television personalities. He punctuated his weather discussions with comments about gardening, cooking, and hunting and fishing. During his channel 4 career, Hall also hosted Land and Lakes, an outdoors show focusing on local hunting and fishing adventures. Hall retired in 2005, and later died on December 23, 2011.

Rudy Kalis began anchoring the morning newscasts in 2014 after working in the sports department for 40 years. He was the second sportscaster in Nashville to move to anchoring the morning news in the past year. He retired in November 2017, after 43 years with channel 4.

Longtime anchor Demetria Kalodimos was let go after her contract expired at the end of 2017.

===== Notable former on-air staff =====
- Charlie Chase (1970s)
- Huell Howser (1970s)
- Demetria Kalodimos – anchor (worked with station from 1984 to 2017)
- Sondra Locke (1960s)
- Carol Marin – investigative reporter/anchor (1976–1978)
- Dan Miller – anchor (died April 8, 2009)
- Robin Roberts – sports anchor/reporter (1986–1988)
- Pat Sajak – weather reporter (1972–1977)
- John Tesh – reporter/anchor (1975–1976)

== Technical information ==
=== Subchannels ===
The station's signal is multiplexed:

Subchannels of WSMV-TV
Subchannel	Res.	Short name	Programming
4.1	1080i	WSMV-HD	NBC
4.2	720p	TSN	Tennessee Valley SEN
4.3	480i	COZI	Cozi TV
4.4	480i	Oxygen	Oxygen
4.5	480i	Shop LC	Shop LC
30.3	480i	Comet	Comet (WUXP-TV)

Broadcast on behalf of another station

=== Analog-to-digital conversion ===
WSMV-TV ended regular programming on its analog signal, over VHF channel 4, on June 12, 2009, the official date on which full-power television stations in the United States transitioned from analog to digital broadcasts under federal mandate. The station's digital signal remained on its pre-transition VHF channel 10, using virtual channel 4.

As part of the SAFER Act, WSMV-TV kept its analog signal on the air until June 26 to inform viewers of the digital television transition through a loop of public service announcements from the National Association of Broadcasters.

=== Translators ===
- W14EE-D 14 Algood
- W29FR-D 15 Lebanon–Nashville
- WFET-LD 15 Lewisburg–Columbia
- WTNX-LD 15 Nashville

== Out-of-market coverage ==
=== South-central Kentucky ===
For its first 50 years on the air, WSMV had been the default NBC affiliate of record for the Bowling Green media market in south-central Kentucky, since it did not have an NBC affiliate of its own, especially after Arbitron first assigned Bowling Green into its own media market in 1977 following the success and growth of that area's ABC affiliate (and now sister station) WBKO, which, until 1989, was the only commercial television station in the Bowling Green area at the time. The station, as WSM-TV, once applied to set up a low-powered translator on the campus of Western Kentucky University in Bowling Green in 1968 as part of an arrangement with the University; it lasted a short time in the 1970s. WSMV's historical monopoly in providing NBC programming for that area over-the-air and on local cable systems ended on March 27, 2001, when WKNT (channel 40, now WNKY) was forced to drop its Fox network affiliation due to that station's violation of the terms in its affiliation agreement. Immediately after losing Fox, that station became an NBC affiliate as it was renamed as WNKY, causing many Bowling Green area cable systems to drop WSMV. However, even after WNKY switched to NBC in 2001, WSMV remains on Mediacom cable systems serving the Morgantown (Butler County) and Brownsville (Edmonson County) areas. The Glasgow Electric Plant Board also still carried WSMV and its associated subchannels on their lineup until WNKY claimed market exclusivity on that system in terms of NBC and CBS affiliates in late 2017.

Mediacom also carries WSMV on its systems in Hart and Metcalfe Counties (including Munfordville and Edmonton, respectively).

=== Western Kentucky ===
In addition to the station's cable coverage in south central Kentucky, WSMV-TV, and the other two "Big Three" stations are also carried in Murray, Kentucky, in the Paducah, Kentucky–Cape Girardeau, Missouri–Harrisburg, Illinois media market, via Murray Electric Systems. Cornerstone Connectivity also carries both WSMV and WTVF on its cable lineup for its customers in Calloway County. WSMV, along with WTVF, are also available to Mediacom's customers in Caldwell and Crittenden counties, respectively including the communities of Princeton and Marion, along with the village of Fredonia. All of those areas are also within the Paducah/Cape Girardeau market, which is the home market to fellow NBC affiliate WPSD-TV.

WSMV was also previously available in some southern areas of the Evansville, Indiana, media market, mainly including northwestern Kentucky towns such as Madisonville, Central City, Beaver Dam, and Owensboro and their corresponding counties. The Owensboro Messenger-Inquirer still lists WSMV on its TV listings page. Cable systems in those areas have since dropped the station making Evansville NBC affiliate and sister station WFIE the sole NBC affiliate on cable and over-the-air in those areas.

=== West Tennessee ===
WSMV, along with WMC-TV in Memphis, was historically carried on cable systems in the Jackson, Tennessee, market on the Jackson Energy Authority's EPlus Broadband system. In November 2014, WSMV was dropped from that cable system when WNBJ-LD (channel 39) signed on as that area's own NBC affiliate. WNBJ replaced WSMV on JEA channel 4, with WMC-TV being left intact. In spite of the existence of WNBJ-LD in Jackson, WSMV remains on Cornerstone Connectivity's cable system in Gibson County, in the northernmost area of the Jackson market. WSMV is also still available on cable in Carroll County, as well as Lake, Obion and Weakley counties, the three Tennessee counties that are in the Paducah market.

=== Huntsville/Northern Alabama ===
At sometime from 1957 until the 1980s, cable television systems in northern Alabama, including Knology (now Wide Open West) and TelePrompTer (later Group W Cable, now Comcast Xfinity), carried all of Nashville's Big Three stations, only to be dropped from those systems in the 1980s amid the gradual increase of the launches of new national cable channels. The Nashville stations were once seen as far south as Decatur.
