= WDEF =

WDEF may refer to:

- WDEF-FM, a radio station (92.3 FM) licensed to serve Chattanooga, Tennessee, United States
- WDEF-TV, a television station (channel 8, virtual 12) licensed to serve Chattanooga, Tennessee
- WXCT, a radio station (1370 AM) licensed to serve Chattanooga, Tennessee, which held the call sign WDEF from 1940 to 2016
