= Cy Bahakel =

American politician (1919–2006)

Member of the North Carolina State Senate
- In office 1972–1976

Personal details
- Born: April 12, 1919 Birmingham, Alabama, U.S.
- Died: April 20, 2006 (aged 87) Charlotte, North Carolina, U.S.
- Party: Democratic
- Education: University of Alabama (AB, LLB)

Cy Nesbe Bahakel (April 12, 1919 – April 20, 2006) was an American politician. He was a North Carolina state senator and a media magnate. He was a member of the Democratic Party. His son-in-law is former US Representative Robert Pittenger (R-NC).

Bahakel was born to a poor Lebanese family in Birmingham, Alabama on April 12, 1919. He helped pay his way through University of Alabama School of Law by doing sports play-by-play and other announcing duties at Tuscaloosa's WJRD radio, a sideline that made him question his goals to become a lawyer. He practiced law for six months, but the lure of the microphone was too strong. He and a friend put up $12,500 each and launched WKOZ, a radio station in Kosciusko, Mississippi. Within a year, Bahakel bought out his partner and found that one of the best investments in business was an hour spent talking to customers over a cup of coffee. He went on to build radio stations from scratch in Greenwood, Mississippi, Kingsport, Tennessee, and Roanoke, Virginia. One of his larger-market radio purchases was WDOD-FM, Chattanooga and its now-defunct counterpart, WDOD, and later WDEF and WDEF-FM, also Chattanooga, all still owned by Bahakel Communications. As the era of television dawned in the 1950s, Bahakel tried his hand in this new fad as well, and founded WABG-TV in Greenwood, the Mississippi Delta's first TV station, in 1959. Bahakel later acquired stations in Charlotte, North Carolina, Columbia, South Carolina (WCCA-TV), and Montgomery, Alabama.

Bahakel was instrumental in bringing the Charlotte Hornets National Basketball Association franchise to Charlotte in 1987. He was a primary investor in the team and was the guarantor of the $32 million loan for the franchise fee to bring the team to Charlotte.

Bahakel ran unsuccessfully as a Democrat for the U.S. House of Representatives in 1970, losing to incumbent Republican Charles R. Jonas. Bahakel served in the North Carolina Senate from 1972 until 1976.

Bahakel died at his home in Charlotte on April 20, 2006, at the age of 87. He is survived by his wife, six children, and five grandchildren.

North Carolina Senate
Preceded by Harry Stroman Bagnal; Hamilton C. Horton Jr.	Member of the North Carolina Senate from the 22nd district 1973–1977; Served alongside: Haden Edward Knox, Herman Aubrey Moore, Michael P. Mullins, Frederick Douglas Alexander, James Doyle McDuffie	Succeeded by William Craig Lawing; Carolyn Williamson Mathis
