= WKXJ =

- Rossville, Georgia; United States
- Broadcast area: Chattanooga metropolitan area
- Frequency: 105.5 MHz (HD Radio)
- Branding: 105.5 KISS Chattanooga

Programming
- Language: English
- Format: Contemporary hit radio
- Affiliations: Premiere Networks; Westwood One

Ownership
- Owner: Audacy, Inc.; (Audacy License, LLC)
- Sister stations: WLND; WRXR-FM; WUSY

History
- First air date: June 23, 1964
- Former call signs: WRIP-FM (1966–73); WQUD (1973); WOWE (1973–78); WOWE-FM (1978–86); WLMX (1986–89); WLMX-FM (1989–99); WRXR-FM (1999-2025)
- Call sign meaning: "Kiss FM"

Technical information
- Licensing authority: FCC
- Facility ID: 14735
- Class: A
- ERP: 5,300 watts
- HAAT: 106 meters (348 ft)
- Transmitter coordinates: 34.956°N 85.292°W

Links
- Public license information: Public file; LMS
- Webcast: Listen live (via Audacy)
- Website: www.audacy.com/kisschattanooga

WKXJ (105.5 FM) is a commercial radio station licensed to Rossville, Georgia, United States, and serving the Chattanooga, Tennessee, area. The station operates a Top 40 (CHR) music format and is branded as "105.5 KISS FM." It is owned by Audacy, Inc. Its studios are located on Old Lee Road in Chattanooga, and its transmitter is located in Rossville, GA.

== Station history ==
The 103.7 frequency is a newly assigned signal to the area, where it relocated from McMinnville, Tennessee and had been at 103.9 MHz, where its previous format was Country, now relocated to sister station WTRZ. But before WTRZ played country music as "Hot Country 103.7," the station, known as "Z-104" during the mid-1980s to early 1990s, was a mix of Adult contemporary, AOR, and CHR. As WBMC in the early 1980s aired an adult contemporary format. The move to Chattanooga had been in the works since 2003. In a statement from the online website The Chattanoogan on June 18, 2008, Clear Channel VP/Market Manager Mark Bass said, "This is going to be a carefully researched radio station that reaches a huge number of listeners in the Chattanooga area with a unique format that is not in this market anywhere, and something new and unique to the country, we're taking it first step forward."

Old KISS FM logo.

On June 23, 2008, after playing a ticking clock for a few minutes, the station flipped to a Disco format branded as "Boogie 103.7". However, a few weeks later, the disco music was replaced with clips of The Rick and Bubba Show played around the clock. On August 29, 2008, the station flipped to an Adult Contemporary format branded as "103.7 The River," featuring "Delilah" at night. However, after a year in the format, Clear Channel decided to bring the KISS-FM brand back to Chattanooga for the first time in 2 years, which was previously used at sister station WLND.

On November 1, 2017, iHeartMedia announced that WKXJ, along with all of their sister stations in Chattanooga and Richmond, would be sold to Entercom (now Audacy, Inc) due to that company's merger with CBS Radio. The sale was completed on December 19, 2017.

On January 22, 2021, WKXJ replaced Elvis Duran & The Morning Show with The Bert Show.

On May 16, 2025, Audacy announced that WKXJ's top 40/CHR format would be moving to 105.5 on May 23, Swapping frequencies with 103.7 resulting in a stronger signal for the Active Rock format on WRXR and a weaker signal for WKXJ. Like WRXR, WKXJ had been failing to overtake Bahakel's WDOD-FM, registering only a 2.7 share in the March 2025 ratings books, compared to WDOD-FM's 6.0.
