= WDOD =

WDOD may refer to:

- WDOD-FM, a radio station (96.5 FM) licensed to Chattanooga, Tennessee, United States
- WDOD (AM), a defunct radio station (1310 AM) licensed to Chattanooga, Tennessee, United States
