= WDEF-TV =

Television station in Chattanooga, Tennessee

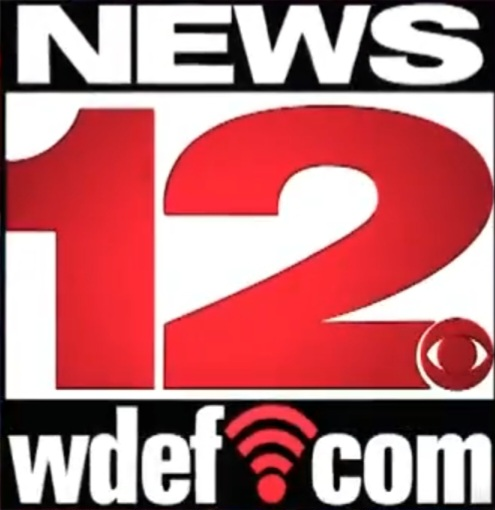

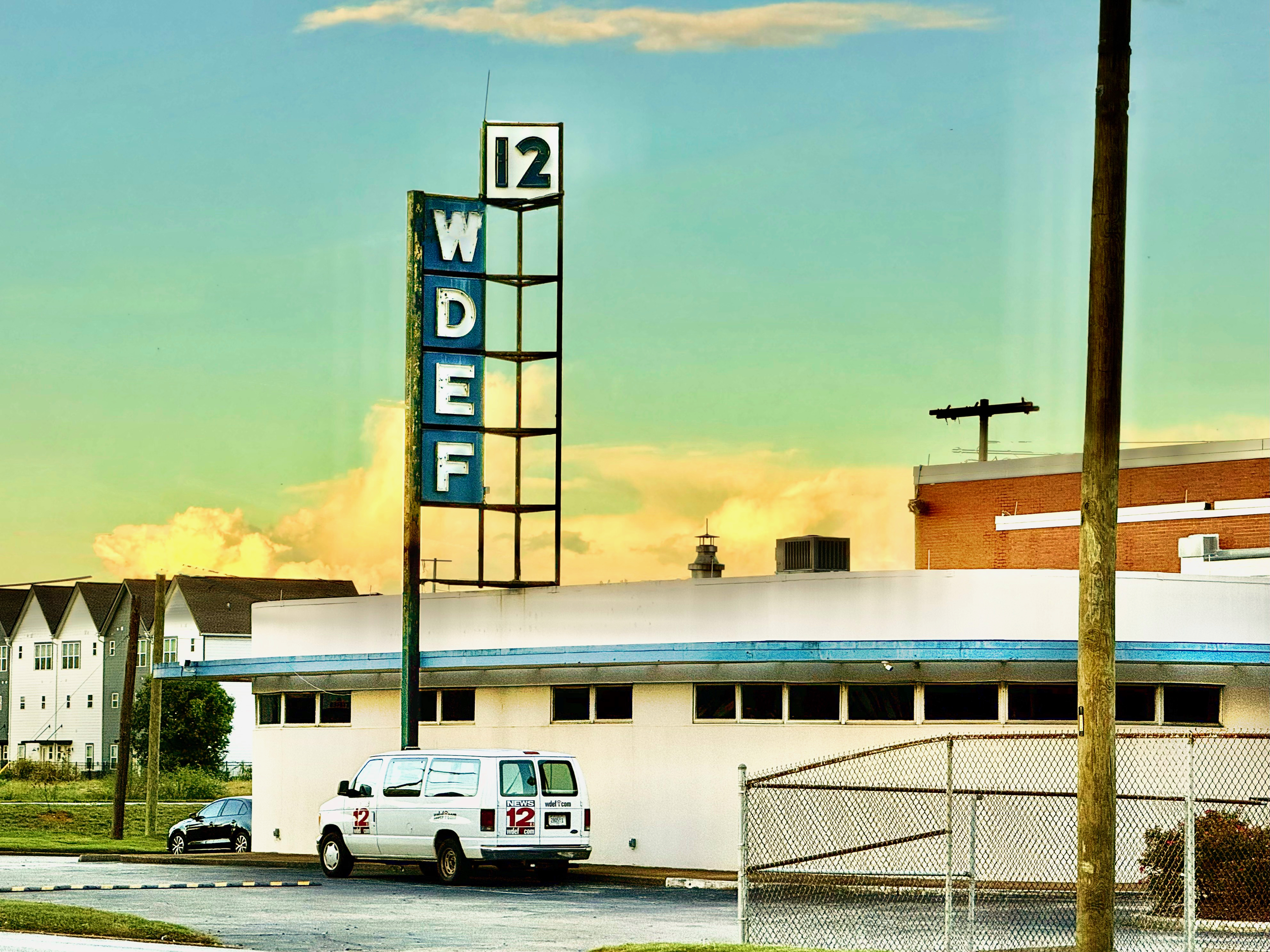
- WDEF-TV studios on Broad Street in Chattanooga
- Chattanooga, Tennessee; United States
- Channels: Digital: 8 (VHF); Virtual: 12
- Branding: News 12

Programming
- Affiliations: 12.1: CBS; for others, see § Subchannels

Ownership
- Owner: Morris Multimedia; (WDEF-TV, Inc.)

History
- First air date: April 25, 1954
- Former channel numbers: Analog: 12 (VHF, 1954–2009); Digital: 47 (UHF, 2001–2009), 12 (VHF, 2009–2020)
- Former affiliations: NBC (1954–1956); DuMont (secondary, 1954–1955); CBS (secondary, 1954–1956); ABC (secondary, 1954–1958); UPN (secondary, 2004–2006)
- Call sign meaning: Random assignment when WDEF radio was permitted in 1940

Technical information
- Licensing authority: FCC
- Facility ID: 54385
- ERP: 35.9 kW
- HAAT: 384 m (1,260 ft)
- Transmitter coordinates: 35°8′6″N 85°19′25″W

Links
- Public license information: Public file; LMS
- Website: wdef.com

WDEF-TV (channel 12) is a television station in Chattanooga, Tennessee, United States, affiliated with CBS. Owned by Morris Multimedia, the station maintains studios on Broad Street in Chattanooga. Its transmitter is on Hampton Road in nearby Signal Mountain, along Walden Ridge.

WDEF-TV was the first television station to sign on in Chattanooga, debuting on April 25, 1954. It was built by a consortium of the owners of WDEF radio and two competing applicants for the channel, which merged to avoid a hearing. Originally a primary NBC affiliate, it switched to CBS in 1956 ahead of the arrival of a second local station. Popular WDEF radio personalities were seen on the new station, among them talk show host Drue Smith and Luther Masingill, whose career in Chattanooga broadcasting spanned more than 70 years.

In its first decades on air, WDEF-TV was the market leader, including after the 1964 acquisition of the WDEF stations by Roy H. Park. However, the station's ratings gradually declined due to disinvestment as competing stations invested in their news departments. After selling off the WDEF radio stations in 1996, Park Communications was acquired by Media General in 1997, but there was no change in WDEF's ratings fortunes under Media General or Morris, which purchased the station in 2006.

== History ==
=== Construction and early years ===
When the Federal Communications Commission (FCC) lifted its multi-year freeze on new television station applications in April 1952, Chattanooga was assigned two VHF television channels, 3 and 12, and several Chattanooga stations began considering filing for them. The FCC received applications for channel 12 from three firms. Southern Television, Inc., had connections to the movie theater industry. Chattanooga radio station WDEF, which had placed an order for television equipment in 1951, proposed a station twice as powerful as any then on the air. Tri-State Telecasting Corporation was a group of local residents who also offered stock in the firm to the public; among its stockholders were the owners of radio station WAGC.

The FCC designated the three applications for hearing in April 1953. With the process dragging on and Chattanooga still without a local TV station, negotiations began on merging the applications, which was first reported in late November. The merger was made official on December 11. It saw Tri-State and Southern withdraw their applications in favor of buying 27.5% each of the stock in the parent company of WDEF radio and television. On January 20, 1954, an FCC examiner issued an initial decision favoring the combined WDEF application. Construction began after the commission issued the construction permit on January 28.

WDEF-TV began broadcasting a test pattern on April 15, 1954, with program service beginning on April 25. It broadcast from a transmitter on Signal Mountain, with studios on the fourth floor of the Volunteer Life Building downtown. It was a primary affiliate of NBC, in keeping with WDEF radio, though as the only station in Chattanooga it also aired programs from CBS, ABC, and DuMont Television Network. Much of the station's staff came from Nebraska, having been hired by Harold "Hap" Anderson, who had started KOLN-TV there the year before; when KOLN-TV merged with that city's KFOR-TV, much of the staff became redundant, allowing many of them to follow Anderson to Chattanooga.

The new television station drew on personalities Chattanoogans already knew from WDEF radio. Among them were Luther Masingill, who had been on WDEF radio since its start in 1941 and hosted matinee movies; sportscaster Herschel Nation; and Drue Smith, public affairs director and interviewer. Smith hosted a talk show, Drue at Two. A local children's program, Chickarooney and Friends, aired on weekdays; other programs included a variety show, Jalopy. Also among the early programming was news coverage. The original program plans called for an evening newscast consisting of ten minutes of wire service copy and five minutes devoted to local news. Mort Lloyd was one of the original news anchors and the most popular in the city, remaining with the station through 1958.

In 1956, the FCC approved Chattanooga's second television station, WRGP-TV (now WRCB) on channel 3. Even though WDEF radio and television had been NBC affiliates, WDEF-TV opted at that time to become a primary CBS and secondary ABC affiliate. The station also invested in improved facilities, increasing its effective radiated power to 316,000 watts in December 1956 and buying the former Glass House restaurant at South Broad and 33rd streets to serve as the basis for a new studio complex in 1957. The station converted the former restaurant into offices and built a two-story addition to house radio and television studios, which was dedicated in December 1958. That same year, Chattanooga gained a third TV station and primary ABC affiliate: WTVC (channel 9), which moved in from Rome, Georgia.

=== Park Broadcasting ownership ===
Roy H. Park of Ithaca, New York, agreed in October 1963 to buy WDEF radio and television for $2.78 million. The transaction received FCC approval in February 1964. Initially, WDEF remained the market leader for news in Chattanooga. In 1970, Lloyd returned to the station after 12 years at channel 3. He departed in 1974 to run for the U.S. House of Representatives; he won the primary election but was killed in a plane crash, and his widow, Marilyn Lloyd, replaced him on the ballot and was elected. Park's general lack of investment came to catch up to the station. Under Sarkes Tarzian and Belo Corporation ownership, respectively, WRCB and WTVC caught up to and surpassed WDEF in the ratings, leaving WDEF in decline. WDEF had commanded an audience share as high as 46 percent in 1978, but this had dwindled to 16 percent by 1983, as WTVC aggressively retooled its newscasts. Then, WRCB rode the popularity of Wheel of Fortune to ratings increases for its early evening news. At one point in 1982 and 1983, WDEF had four news anchors in the span of a year. By 1986, the CBS Evening News, nationally the top-rated evening network newscast, was third in Chattanooga.

In 1987, Park Communications (Note: Park Broadcasting renamed itself by 1983.) reinvested in the WDEF stations. It canceled the long-running The Morning Show, which had aired from 6:30 to 8 a.m. since 1969, and reallocated its resources to the evening newscasts. New station manager Mark Keown noted that the commitment to refocus on news was long overdue. In spite of the improvements, the Chattanooga TV news ratings race remained defined by a close battle between WRCB and WTVC, with WDEF attracting a third to half the viewers of those stations for its 6 and 11 p.m. newscasts by 1992. One exception was during the 1994 Winter Olympics, when WDEF won the sweeps period.

Park Communications sold itself in 1994 to Donald R. Tomlin and Gary B. Knapp in a deal backed by the Retirement Systems of Alabama pension fund. As part of a plan to concentrate on its newspapers and television stations, Park Communications ended the common ownership of WDEF radio and television by selling the radio stations to Bahakel Communications in 1996; they remained in the same building until 1998, when Bahakel opened new studios for WDEF-AM-FM and WDOD-AM-WDOD-FM. Though they were now separately owned, Luther Masingill continued his association with both stations. In his later years, he hosted WDEF-FM's morning show and feature segments on WDEF-TV's noon and 6 p.m. newscasts. He remained active until his death in 2014 at the age of 92.

=== Media General and Morris ownership ===
Media General, a broadcaster and publisher based in Richmond, Virginia, announced it would purchase Park Communications in July 1996, creating a company focused on media holdings in the Southeast. Media General relaunched the station in 1998 with a new logo, news set, and anchor talent. The competitive position of WDEF did not change much; by 2006, WRCB and WTVC were nearly tied for first both in ratings and in revenue.

Prior to 2006, WDEF and Fox affiliate WDSI-TV (channel 61) split a secondary affiliation with UPN. When UPN and The WB merged to form The CW that year, the former WB affiliate, WFLI-TV (channel 53), became the market's CW affiliate.

In 2006, Media General agreed to buy four stations from NBC. To help finance the transaction, WDEF-TV was one of several stations in smaller markets the company put up for sale. Morris Multimedia acquired the station for $22 million. Under Morris, WDEF remained in third place in news even as CBS network programming was more competitive.

== Notable former on-air staff ==
- Dan Howell – reporter, to 1992
- Milissa Rehberger – anchor
- Ducis Rodgers – weekend anchor, to 1995
- Drue Smith – public affairs director and host of Drue at Two, 1950s
- Lara Spencer – reporter, 1992–1993
- Alison Starling – anchor-reporter

== Technical information and subchannels ==
WDEF-TV's transmitter is located on Hampton Road in Signal Mountain, Tennessee. Its signal is multiplexed:

Subchannels of WDEF-TV
Subchannel	Res.	Short name	Programming
12.1	1080i	WDEF	CBS
12.2	480i	Bounce	Bounce TV
12.3	480i	Mystery	Ion Mystery
12.4	480i	Grit-TV	Grit
12.5	480i	CourtTV	Court TV
12.6	480i	LaffTV	Laff

WDEF-TV was the first Chattanooga station to broadcast a digital signal, on UHF channel 47, which was first activated in April 2002. WDEF and WTCI were the only Chattanooga stations to shut off analog broadcasts on the original digital transition date of February 17, 2009. At that time, WDEF switched from broadcasting on channel 47 to channel 12. It relocated its signal from channel 12 to channel 8 on July 2, 2020, as a result of the 2016 United States wireless spectrum auction.
