= WKOZ =

Radio station in Kosciusko, Mississippi (1947–2012)

Kosciusko, Mississippi; United States
- Frequency: 1340 kHz

Ownership
- Owner: Boswell Media, LLC

History
- First air date: October 1947
- Last air date: July 13, 2012
- Call sign meaning: Similar to Kosciusko

Technical information
- Facility ID: 6480
- Class: C
- Power: 1,000 watts (unlimited)
- Transmitter coordinates: 33°3′51.5″N 89°36′12.3″W

WKOZ was a radio station licensed to Kosciusko, Mississippi, United States, which operated at 1340 AM from 1947 to 2012. Last owned by Boswell Media, LLC, the station featured an urban adult contemporary format known as "1340 The Groove", which transferred to co-owned WKOZ-FM at closure. WKOZ's studios and transmitter were located in Kosciusko, west of the city's downtown. It was the first station to be owned by lawyer-turned-broadcaster Cy Bahakel.

== History ==
WKOZ was started by Cy Bahakel, then a lawyer working in Tuscaloosa, Alabama, and James W. Arendale, Sr. The partnership, known as Kosciusko Broadcasting Company, obtained a construction permit from the Federal Communications Commission on July 10, 1947, and the 250-watt station on 1340 kHz signed on in October. It was the second attempt at a radio station in Kosciusko; the first, WHEF, folded for economic reasons. Bahakel, who later went on to be a broadcasting magnate and North Carolina state senator, credited starting WKOZ with teaching him about business fundamentals. In the first year, he was a salesman and announcer; he liked sales, telling The Charlotte News in 1983, "I loved people and, in order to sell advertising, you had to sit down over a cup of coffee for an hour. It was like campaigning." After he bought Arendale out in 1948, he focused on cutting costs, training new announcers himself.

WKOZ was authorized to move to 1350 kHz in March 1955, switching to daytime-only operation. It moved back to 1340 kHz in March 1962, operating with 1,000 watts during the day and 250 at night.

In 1962, Bahakel agreed to buy WDOD in Chattanooga, Tennessee. He already owned the maximum of seven AM radio stations, requiring him to dispose of one. He sold WKOZ to H. Mims Boswell, its general manager, who had worked for WKOZ since before it signed on the air. This was one of three station sales in 1962 to trade up for larger markets—the only sales in the first 30 years of Bahakel Broadcasting. Boswell applied in 1964 for an FM station in Kosciusko, and WKOZ-FM began in late June 1965. The FM station operated from Kosciusko until moving to Madison County in 1996; Boswell owned the facility until a 1998 swap.

WKOZ flipped from oldies to news/talk on October 29, 2001. In 2009, it flipped to urban adult contemporary as "1340 The Groove".

On July 13, 2012, WKOZ ceased broadcasting after 65 years on the air, and Boswell Media surrendered its broadcast license. By this time, "The Groove" was airing on WKOZ-FM 98.3.
