= WLMX =

WLMX may refer to:

- WJNX-FM, a radio station (106.1 FM) licensed to serve Okeechobee, Florida, United States, which held the call sign WLMX from 2019 to 2023
- WZEZ (FM), a radio station (104.9 FM) licensed to serve Balsam Lake, Wisconsin, United States, which held the call sign WLMX-FM from 2000 to 2018
- WRXR-FM, a radio station (105.5 FM) licensed to serve Rossville, Georgia, United States, which held the call sign WLMX or WLMX-FM from 1986 to 1999
- WDYN, a radio station (980 AM) licensed to serve Rossville, Georgia, which held the call sign WLMX from 1989 to 1994
