= WNCF =

Television station in Montgomery, Alabama

- Montgomery, Alabama; United States
- Channels: Digital: 31 (UHF); Virtual: 32
- Branding: ABC 32; Action 8 News; Montgomery's CW (on DT2)

Programming
- Affiliations: 32.1: ABC; 32.2: CW+

Ownership
- Owner: SagamoreHill Broadcasting; (Channel 32 Montgomery LLC)
- Operator: Bahakel Communications
- Sister stations: WBMM, WAKA

History
- First air date: March 24, 1962
- Former call signs: WCCB-TV (1962–1964); WKAB-TV (1964–1989); WHOA-TV (1989–1999)
- Former channel numbers: Analog: 32 (UHF, 1962–2009); Digital: 51 (UHF, 2001–2009), 32 (UHF, 2009–2011)
- Call sign meaning: "Where News Comes First", former slogan

Technical information
- Licensing authority: FCC
- Facility ID: 72307
- ERP: 720 kW
- HAAT: 478 m (1,568 ft)
- Transmitter coordinates: 32°8′57″N 86°44′43″W

Links
- Public license information: Public file; LMS
- Website: www.waka.com/about-us/our-stations/abc-32/

WNCF (channel 32) is a television station in Montgomery, Alabama, United States, affiliated with ABC. It is owned by SagamoreHill Broadcasting and operated by Bahakel Communications alongside Selma-licensed CBS affiliate WAKA (channel 8) and Tuskegee-licensed CW+ affiliate WBMM (channel 22). The three stations share studios on Harrison Road in north Montgomery; WNCF's transmitter is located in Gordonville, Alabama.

== History ==
=== Construction and Bahakel ownership ===
The First Alabama Corporation—a sister company to the First Carolina Corporation, responsible for building WCCA-TV in Columbia, South Carolina—was granted a construction permit on July 26, 1961, for a new television station on channel 32 in Montgomery. The call letters WCCB-TV were selected, and construction began in December 1961.

WCCB-TV began telecasting on March 24, 1962—even though a $10,000 vacuum tube in the transmitter facility had blown less than a week prior. It brought full-time ABC programming to Montgomery for the first time; previously, the network's programs were split between WSFA-TV and WCOV-TV. However, First Carolina and its related companies—which had built WCCA-TV, WCCB-TV, and WCIV in Charleston, South Carolina—fell into financial trouble. It attempted to sell channel 32 to a group led by Winn-Dixie executive vice president Tine W. Davis in October 1962, but no deal materialized, and neither did proposals to "deintermix" Montgomery by moving WSFA to the UHF band. On February 15, 1963, the station shut down and went silent pending financial reorganization. Some of the equipment, having been purchased from General Electric on a conditional sales contract, was then removed.

First Alabama filed for bankruptcy; that August, bankruptcy court approved a sale of channel 32 and the transfer of its license from a receiver to Bahakel Communications, headed by Cy Bahakel (a native Alabamian). The Federal Communications Commission (FCC) approved the transaction at the end of January 1964, and channel 32 returned to air as WKAB-TV on March 12. (The new call sign stood for "Kassner and Bahakel", referring to Bahakel's engineering partner and close friend Don Kassner; Bahakel recycled the WCCB call letters for use at another UHF station he purchased that year in Charlotte, North Carolina.) ABC programs returned to channel 32 from WSFA and WCOV, which had picked up some network programs in the interim.

In 1968, the FCC approved a power increase from 180,000 watts to more than 800,000. Without a power increase, a new antenna installed in 1982 also improved the picture broadcast by WKAB-TV.

=== Buy 8, sell 32 ===
In 1984, WSLA, then a low-powered CBS affiliate in Selma, was approved for a major upgrade of its transmitter facility (activated in 1985) that would allow it to cover the Montgomery area—a concept long opposed by WCOV and WKAB, the two UHF stations in Montgomery. It changed its call letters to WAKA in advance of the move. That November, Bahakel announced it intended to buy WAKA and sell off WKAB to do so. The Bahakel acquisition immediately sparked speculation about a potential affiliation shuffle in the Montgomery market, with rumors of ABC making the move to WAKA. This did not occur. When Bahakel reached a $10 million deal to sell to Washington, D.C.–based Terrapin Communications Corporation, the company included a clause that prevented WAKA from switching to ABC within three years of the sale. The Terrapin name in the seller indicated the Maryland roots of the firm's largest shareholder, former U.S. senator Joseph Tydings.

Frey Communications acquired WKAB-TV from Terrapin in 1988 and embarked on a $2.5 million project to build a new, 2,049-foot (625 m) tower in Lowndes County, which would give channel 32 an over-the-air signal in Selma for the first time ever. In advance of the commissioning of the new mast, the call letters were changed to WHOA-TV, for "We're the Heart of Alabama", in August 1989, a change cited by management as a "fresh start" for channel 32. The fresh start, however, had turned sour by 1992, when the station filed for Chapter 11 bankruptcy reorganization; the largest creditor, Concord Commercial Corporation, was owed $8.3 million, and most of the money owed consisted of payments for programming. In 1993, bankruptcy court approved a reorganization plan that conveyed substantially all of channel 32's assets to Concord, which Frey would then lease back.

Two years later, Ventura Entertainment Group and its affiliate Soundview Media Investments acquired WHOA-TV with an eye to creating a new station group. Soundview, however, held on to the station for less than a year. Deciding that further improvements to channel 32 required more capital than it had available, the company opted to sell it to Park Communications; the $6 million deal included all of the related assets except the tower. Later that same year, Park was purchased by Media General.

=== WNCF ===
Media General was not particularly thrilled to have bought WHOA-TV in the Park acquisition; Jim Zimmerman, president of the company's broadcast division, told the Montgomery Advertiser that he would not have purchased it on a standalone basis. In 1998, Media General proceeded to put WHOA-TV up for sale. The next year, the station was sold for $8 million to a firm known as Broadcast Media Group LLC, controlled by John Kendrick.

Kendrick wasted little time making major changes in the news department. After May 31, 1999, the station suspended its local news service and fired nearly 20 staffers. The call letters were changed in July to WNCF ahead of the relaunch of local news that November.

SagamoreHill Broadcasting acquired WNCF in 2004. It then acquired WBMM in 2006 under a failing station waiver. In 2011, Bahakel acquired WBMM and immediately entered into a shared services agreement to provide WNCF with sales, production, and technical services; the WNCF facility on Harrison Road was chosen to house all three stations' operations and be upgraded to support high-definition production. Bahakel had continued to own the channel 32 building after the 1985 sale of WKAB, and the site offered more room for expansion than WAKA's previous studios close to downtown.

== News operation ==
Compared with the area's other television stations (WSFA, WCOV, and WAKA), WNCF has never had much success operating a news department of its own. Under Bahakel, in 1978, the station put emphasis into growing its newsroom, but a lack of response by viewers led the station to trim back to news updates and drop its 30-minute early evening newscast in 1982. Under Terrapin, the station started again with a 6 p.m. newscast in 1986. After WCOV—which had been stripped of its CBS affiliation in the wake of WAKA's move-in to Montgomery—scrapped local news, WKAB added a 5 p.m. edition. The 6 p.m. program was ultimately dropped and not reinstated until 1997.

Broadcast Media Group scrapped the existing news operation on May 31, 1999, and it set out to build a new one, which debuted that November. The new ABC 32 News was helmed by Bob Howell, a longtime anchor for WSFA who had left that station in 1998. However, ratings out of the gate were poor; channel 32, which was already rating behind WCOV while airing Living Single reruns in November 1998, lost more than half its audience with its new late newscast in place. After three and a half years, the news operation was scrapped in July 2003, with the only remaining news presence being news cut-ins during Good Morning America; one staffer and former WSFA-TV editorial reader said of competing against his former employer, "You can't compete with the 800-pound gorilla".

SagamoreHill made a fourth attempt at a news service for channel 32. In August 2005, WNCF partnered with the Independent News Network (INN), a company that produced local newscasts for stations across the United States from its studios in Davenport, Iowa, to start weekday local news and weather updates. Included in the outsourcing agreement were cut-ins during Good Morning America and a 10-minute newscast at 10 p.m., known as ABC 32 News 10 at Ten. Two reporters in Montgomery contributed local news stories that were read by the Iowa-based presenting team. In 2010, WNCF expanded its partnership with INN to produce a full-length 10 p.m. newscast and a 9 p.m. newscast for WBMM, which had previously aired a program produced by WAKA.

WNCF and WAKA officially debuted their combined local news operation—known as the Alabama News Network—on February 2, 2013, replacing the INN news on WNCF. The two stations simulcast weekday morning, 10 p.m., and weekend newscasts, with WNCF-exclusive newscasts at 5:30 p.m.

== Technical information ==
=== Subchannels ===
The station's signal is multiplexed:

Subchannels of WNCF
| Subchannel | Res. | Short name | Programming |
|---|---|---|---|
| 32.1 | 720p | WNCF-DT | ABC |
| 32.2 | 480i | WBMM-SD | CW+ (WBMM) |

Simulcast of subchannels of another station

=== Analog-to-digital conversion ===
WNCF shut down its analog signal, over UHF channel 32, on April 20, 2009. The station's digital signal relocated from its pre-transition UHF channel 51 to channel 32.
