= WNOO =

Radio station in Chattanooga, Tennessee

Chattanooga, Tennessee; United States
- Broadcast area: Chattanooga, Tennessee
- Frequency: 1260 kHz
- Branding: WNOO 1260 am 99.7 fm

Programming
- Format: Urban contemporary/gospel
- Affiliations: Premiere Networks

Ownership
- Owner: Clear Media, LLC

History
- Call sign meaning: ChattaNOOga

Technical information
- Licensing authority: FCC
- Facility ID: 53955
- Class: D
- Power: 5,000 watts day 25 watts night
- Transmitter coordinates: 35°03′08″N 85°16′22″W
- Translator: 99.7 W259DN (Chattanooga)

Links
- Public license information: Public file; LMS
- Website: wnooradio.com

WNOO (1260 AM) is an urban contemporary/gospel station serving the Chattanooga, Tennessee market, in the United States.

== FM translator ==
In addition to the main station, WNOO is relayed by an FM translator in order to widen the broadcast area, especially at night when WNOO AM reduces power to 25 watts. The FM translator also gives the listener another option, namely FM with high-fidelity sound.

Call sign	Frequency	City of license	FID	ERP (W)	HAAT	Class	FCC info
W259DN	99.7 FM	Chattanooga, Tennessee	141682	99	−20 m (−66 ft)	D	LMS

== History ==
On December 30, 1960, Jerry Tucker of WNOO interviewed Dr. Martin Luther King Jr. just before the civil rights leader gave a speech at Chattanooga's Memorial Auditorium. On January 1, 2006, WTUN started simulcasting with WNOO after its classic country format was moved to WNGA. After a few months of simulcasting with WNOO, WTUN 101.9 then changed their calls to WOCE and is now a Spanish-language broadcaster.

Logo under former 107.3 translator

On May 16, 2019, a city construction crew accidentally hit a guy wire to the station's tower causing it to crash down and knock the station off the air. The station set up a temporary tower so it can operate at reduced power and the station continued to broadcast via streaming audio. The city is paying for a replacement tower.
