= WBMM =

Television station in Tuskegee, Alabama

- Tuskegee–Montgomery, Alabama; United States
- City: Tuskegee, Alabama
- Channels: Digital: 18 (UHF); Virtual: 22
- Branding: Montgomery's CW

Programming
- Affiliations: 22.1: CW+; for others, see § Subchannels

Ownership
- Owner: Bahakel Communications; (Alabama Broadcasting Partners)
- Sister stations: WNCF, WAKA

History
- First air date: September 17, 1999
- Former channel numbers: Analog: 22 (UHF, 1999–2009); Digital: 24 (UHF, 2003–2009), 22 (UHF, 2009–2019)
- Former affiliations: Pax (1999–2005); Daystar (2005–2006)
- Call sign meaning: We Belong in Montgomery

Technical information
- Licensing authority: FCC
- Facility ID: 68427
- ERP: 52 kW
- HAAT: 337 m (1,106 ft)
- Transmitter coordinates: 32°4′5.5″N 85°56′40.8″W
- Translator(s): WNCF-DT 32.2 (UHF) Montgomery

Links
- Public license information: Public file; LMS
- Website: www.waka.com/about-us/our-stations/cw-montgomery/

WBMM (channel 22) is a television station licensed to Tuskegee, Alabama, United States, serving the Montgomery area as an affiliate of The CW Plus. It is owned by Bahakel Communications alongside Selma-licensed CBS affiliate WAKA (channel 8) and operated with ABC affiliate WNCF (channel 32). The three stations share studios on Harrison Road in north Montgomery; WBMM's transmitter is located in unincorporated southwestern Bullock County along the Pike County line.

In addition to its own digital signal, WBMM is simulcast in standard definition on WNCF's second digital subchannel (32.2), broadcasting from its transmitter in Gordonville, Alabama.

== History ==
The station signed on the air on September 17, 1999, as a Pax TV affiliate airing an analog signal on UHF channel 22. WBMM became an affiliate of Daystar in 2005 before eventually joining The CW (through The CW Plus) in 2006. The latter network switch was the result of The WB and UPN shutting down and merging to form The CW. Prior to The CW's formation, UPN was seen through Troy's WRJM-TV (now Cozi TV affiliate WIYC), while The WB aired via cable-only "WBMY", operated by NBC affiliate WSFA as part of The WB 100+ Station Group.

On July 7, 2011, it was announced that Bahakel Communications would purchase WBMM from SagamoreHill Broadcasting for $3.5 million. Following the acquisition, Bahakel immediately entered into a shared services agreement with SagamoreHill, allowing WNCF to begin operations under WAKA.

The official transfer of WBMM from SagamoreHill to Bahakel was completed on October 31, after which Bahakel obtained a waiver of Federal Communications Commission (FCC) duopoly regulations that required a market to be left with eight unique television station owners after a duopoly was formed. SagamoreHill had previously acquired WBMM in 2006 under an FCC "failing station" waiver because the Montgomery–Selma market has only eight commercially licensed full-power stations and the formation of any co-owned duopoly would have left the market with only seven unique station owners. Under the current SSA arrangement with Bahakel, SagamoreHill retains responsibility for WNCF's programming, personnel, and finances while the former company provides that station with sales, administrative, production, and technical services.

Despite being the senior partner in the proposed agreement, WAKA vacated its facilities in South Central Montgomery and consolidated into WNCF's studios at some point in 2012. This was most likely due to the fact that Bahakel has always owned WNCF's facility and had been leasing it to SagamoreHill. Bahakel owned and operated WNCF (as WKAB-TV) until 1985 when it purchased the more desirable WAKA. FCC rules at the time prevented dual television station ownership in a market so the WKAB license was sold but the building and grounds retained. In addition, WNCF's property offered more space for a proposed expansion as compared with the land surrounding WAKA's smaller studios.

== News operation ==
In January 2007, WBMM entered into a news share agreement with WAKA allowing the big three affiliate to produce the market's first prime time newscast on this station. Known as CW News at Nine, the weeknight-only broadcast could be seen for thirty minutes and originated from WAKA's studios featuring most of the CBS affiliate's on-air personnel. WBMM would begin to have competition to its outsourced broadcast on January 7, 2008, after Fox affiliate WCOV-TV entered into a news share arrangement with NBC outlet WSFA. That agreement resulted in Montgomery's second prime time newscast at 9 initially seen only on weeknights for 35 minutes. A weekend half-hour edition began in Summer 2008.

On April 16, 2010, WNCF expanded its partnership with the Independent News Network (INN) and launched a half-hour weeknight newscasts at 9 p.m. on WBMM airing in high definition. As a result, this station terminated its outsourcing arrangement with WAKA. Still known by the same title, the show began to be produced at INN's studios on Tremont Avenue in Davenport, Iowa. The news anchor, meteorologist, and sports anchor were provided by the centralized news operation with other personnel filling-in as needed. WBMM maintained two locally based reporters at its studios who contributed Montgomery-specific coverage to the newscast that was taped in advance and then fed to the station through satellite relay.

After WCOV's contract with WSFA expired at the end of 2010, that station entered into another news outsourcing agreement with WAKA to produce a nightly prime time broadcast. On January 1, 2011, WSFA transitioned its prime-time show to its second digital subchannel (then affiliated with the Retro Television Network) resulting in three options for newscasts at 9. A content sharing arrangement would eventually be set up between WBMM and then-sister station WLTZ in Columbus, Georgia, to share resources when covering East-Central Alabama since Montgomery and Columbus have coverage areas bordering each other. As a result, additional reporters locally employed by WLTZ were seen during CW News at Nine. After the change in ownership to Bahakel, personnel from the NBC station in Columbus were dropped. At some point in summer 2012, WBMM and WNCF terminated their newscast outsourcing agreement with the Independent News Network in preparation for local news production duties to be assumed by WAKA.

WNCF and WAKA officially debuted their combined local news operation on February 2, 2013. Based out of what was formerly WNCF's studios on Harrison Road, a newly expanded high definition-ready facility featured production capabilities which allowed WAKA to begin offering local news in high definition. Despite merging with WNCF, WAKA continued to produce a nightly, half-hour prime time newscast at 9 on Fox affiliate WCOV through a pre-existing news share arrangement. As a result, there were no local newscasts airing on WBMM. On February 4, the station began airing a reformatted version of WNCF's longtime weekday morning show Good Morning Montgomery (hosted by Alva Lambert, Johnny Green, and Joe Hagler). However, it now airs weekdays from 1 to 2 p.m. on WBMM and is currently known on-air as Good Afternoon Montgomery. The program is similar to a radio talk show with guests interacting with the hosts and opportunities for viewers to call-in. Like all CW Plus outlets in the Central Time Zone, WBMM aired the nationally syndicated morning show The Daily Buzz on weekdays from 6 to 8 a.m.

== Technical information ==
=== Subchannels ===
The station's signal is multiplexed:

Subchannels of WBMM
| Subchannel | Res. | Short name | Programming |
|---|---|---|---|
| 22.1 | 720p | WBMM-DT | The CW Plus |
| 22.2 | 480i | WBMM-ST | Start TV |
| 22.3 | 480i | WBMM-MT | MeTV Toons |
| 22.4 | 480i | WBMM-IP | Ion Plus |
| 22.5 | 480i | WBMM-LF | Laff |
| 22.6 | 480i | WBMM-NW | Newsmax2 |
| 22.7 | 480i | WBMM-SY | Story Television |
| 22.8 | 480i | WBMM-8 | [Blank] |

=== Analog-to-digital conversion ===
WBMM shut down its analog signal, over UHF channel 22, in 2009. The station's digital signal relocated from its pre-transition UHF channel 24 to channel 22.
