= WOCE =

WOCE may mean:

- World Ocean Circulation Experiment
- WOCE (FM) 101.9 in Ringgold, Georgia, USA
