= WAKA (TV) =

Television station in Selma, Alabama

- Selma–Montgomery, Alabama; United States
- City: Selma, Alabama
- Channels: Digital: 25 (UHF); Virtual: 8
- Branding: WAKA Channel 8; Action 8 News

Programming
- Affiliations: 8.1: CBS; for others, see § Subchannels

Ownership
- Owner: Bahakel Communications; (Alabama Broadcasting Partners)
- Sister stations: WBMM, WNCF

History
- First air date: March 17, 1960
- Former call signs: WSLA (1960–1984)
- Former channel numbers: Analog: 8 (VHF, 1960–2008); Digital: 55 (UHF, 1999–2008), 42 (UHF, 2008–2019)
- Former affiliations: Independent (1960); ABC (1960–1968); Dark (1968–1973)
- Call sign meaning: "We Always Know Alabama"

Technical information
- Licensing authority: FCC
- Facility ID: 701
- ERP: 944 kW
- HAAT: 495 m (1,624 ft)
- Transmitter coordinates: 32°8′57.9″N 86°46′42.6″W

Links
- Public license information: Public file; LMS
- Website: www.waka.com

WAKA (channel 8) is a television station licensed to Selma, Alabama, United States, serving as the CBS affiliate for the Montgomery area. It is owned by Bahakel Communications alongside Tuskegee-licensed CW+ affiliate WBMM (channel 22) and operated with ABC affiliate WNCF (channel 32). The three stations share studios on Harrison Road in north Montgomery; WAKA's transmitter is located in Gordonville, Alabama, which is about halfway between Montgomery and Selma.

== History ==
=== Early years ===
Channel 8 debuted on March 17, 1960, as WSLA (call letters representing Selma). The station was originally owned by the Brennan family and their company, Deep South Broadcasting, along with WBAM radio in Montgomery (740 AM, now WMSP), and broadcast from a converted home in Selma with the studio located in the garage. Deep South originally sought the WBAM-TV call letters for channel 8. However, in those days, Selma and Montgomery were separate markets, and Federal Communications Commission (FCC) regulations at the time would not allow companion call letters to be issued to stations located in different markets. Originally an independent, it picked up an ABC affiliation soon afterward.

Channel 8 was the only primary ABC affiliate in south-central Alabama. In Montgomery, ABC was relegated to off-hours clearances on NBC affiliate WSFA-TV and CBS affiliate WCOV-TV. Originally, Deep South could not afford a direct network feed. Instead, station engineers switched in and out of the signal of WBRC-TV in Birmingham whenever ABC programming was available. Often, if the engineer was not paying attention, local WBRC breaks and IDs would air on WSLA. It operated from a tiny 360-foot (110 m) tower just west of Selma, with only 3,000 watts of power. This effectively limited its coverage area to Dallas County.

In 1964, WKAB-TV (later WHOA-TV and now WNCF) started up as Montgomery's ABC affiliate, but WSLA continued to broadcast ABC programming to the western part of the market because of UHF's limited coverage at the time. It could be argued that WSLA was almost always a CBS affiliate. Once it ended a brief stint as an independent station and affiliated with ABC, it also established a secondary affiliation with CBS by carrying one hour of that network's programming every week with Ted Mack's Original Amateur Hour.

=== 1968 fire and rebuilding ===
On the morning of July 31, 1968, WSLA employee Bailey Bowline, Jr. drove to work at 3:30 a.m. to discover the station had been set on fire, completely destroying the facility on Land Line Road and causing more than $100,000 in damage. The night before, the station had been airing a religious program, during which the station received a phone call from a viewer, promising to "settle it with TNT". It was also reported that filing cabinets had been pulled open before the fire. George Singleton, who worked at the station as a teenager and later became its general manager, noted that WSLA's loss was not a large one for the community, saying that "it really wasn't much of a station".

Channel 8 had been for sale prior to the fire, and negotiations continued with H. Guthrie Bell, whose Gay-Bell Broadcasting owned WCOV-TV and a station in Lexington, Kentucky. Gay-Bell agreed to buy WSLA in August for $115,000; it would have operated the station as a semi-satellite of WCOV-TV. However, the application was dismissed on August 25, 1969. Ten months later, on June 11, 1970, the Brennans filed to sell the station to Charles Grisham and his company, Central Alabama Broadcasting, which owned WHNT-TV in Huntsville and WYEA in Columbus, Georgia. Central Alabama also filed to rebuild WSLA with 25,100 watts of effective radiated power—the station had previously broadcast with 2,510 watts—which was approved by the FCC in 1971. A second increase to 53.8 kW followed in 1975.

It would not be until November 1, 1973, when WSLA began broadcasting again. The new WSLA was a full-color CBS affiliate. However, it broadcast in one of the smallest markets in the United States, ranked 211th out of 215; in 1981, its small news department produced just one early evening newscast, and the sports and weather presenters doubled as a swimming pool salesman and a station sales executive, respectively.

=== Fighting for more power ===
For over 30 years, channel 8's various owners attempted to substantially increase its power and thus expand its viewing area. Selma was just barely large enough for a full-fledged television station, and the only way the station could be profitable would be if it operated from a transmitter powerful enough to reach Montgomery. In May 1954, three months after the Brennans received the original construction permit, they filed to replace its rather spartan facility in Selma with a 1,750-foot (533 m) tower just north of Prattville, later amended to a site near Strata in southern Montgomery County. It would operate with an effective radiated power of 316,000 watts, the maximum allowed for a high-band VHF station. The proceeding saw arguments from WCOV-TV, which feared that WSLA's move would jeopardize the development of UHF in Montgomery (and put its own CBS affiliation in jeopardy) and WSFA, but it was ultimately a defect in the proposed tower plan that prompted the FCC to deny the application in September 1958.

By this time, the channel 8 allocation in Selma had caught the attention of Post Stations, the broadcasting division of The Washington Post. In the late 1950s, in an effort to maximize the 12 VHF channels available, the FCC proposed relaxing its mileage separation rules for these channels. The separations were proposed to be decreased only a few miles to minimize interference; however, the channel 8 frequency at Selma would be one of a handful of channels that could fall under this action. Had the proposal been implemented, the channel 8 license would have been moved to Birmingham (channel 8 at Nashville, then occupied by WSIX-TV, under 10 miles (16 km) too close to Birmingham according to established FCC interference separation rules, had prevented this in the past). The Post made it clear that it would like to move the channel 8 allocation to Birmingham.

Meanwhile, the Brennans seemed to have no immediate plans to activate channel 8 at Selma. However, when the FCC rejected its application for a tower closer to Montgomery, Deep South went on the air anyway from its originally-specified facilities in Selma about eight months afterward, presumably fearing it would lose the license otherwise. Later, Deep South applied to build a 2,000-foot (610 m) tower in West Blocton that could serve Birmingham, Tuscaloosa, and Selma. This request also failed after two other UHF stations—WCFT (now WSES) in Tuscaloosa and WBMG (now WIAT) in Birmingham—objected out of concerns for fostering UHF's growth. WCFT and WBMG had construction permits to build new towers, but stated they would not do so if channel 8 was granted a tower at West Blocton.

In 1976, Grisham filed once more for an application to build a maximum-powered site, this time from a tall tower near Lowndesboro; it could not build a taller tower in Selma or anywhere else in Dallas County because of existing flight patterns. WCOV fought again, this time suggesting the deintermixture of the Selma and Montgomery markets to make all stations UHF; in 1978, it proposed moving channel 8 to Tuscaloosa for educational use and channel 12 to Columbus, with WSFA being reassigned channel 45. The FCC denied the WCOV proposal in May 1980. In July, it then proceeded to approve the WSLA application. Appeals from WCOV and WKAB dragged on for several more years until final approval from the FCC was granted in 1983 and a federal appeals court denied further pleas from the UHF stations the next year.

=== Moving into Montgomery ===
As planning began on expanded WSLA facilities, nature took aim at the existing channel 8 tower. On May 3, 1984, a tornado toppled the mast, sending its base crashing into the trailer that housed the station's news department. There were no injuries, and the transmitter was not damaged, allowing the station to return to the air within weeks.

The Dallas County Commission approved the tower in September, clearing the final hurdle to allow construction to begin. At the same time, to avoid confusion with WSFA in preparation for the move, WSLA changed its call letters to WAKA—unofficially claimed to stand for "We Are Kicking Ass"—on October 29 and began its $4 million facilities improvement program. The following April, WAKA activated its new 1,684-foot (513 m) tower in Gordonville. It now claimed to have the largest coverage area in the entire state of Alabama, with at least secondary coverage from the fringes of the Birmingham and Tuscaloosa suburbs to the Florida Panhandle and Wiregrass Region to the southeast.

The move-in also brought a new owner. In November 1984, Bahakel Communications, owner of WKAB, announced plans to buy WAKA and sell off the Montgomery UHF station. The Bahakel acquisition immediately sparked speculation about a potential affiliation shuffle in the Montgomery market, with rumors of ABC making the move to WAKA. In June, WCOV officials said that, for "business reasons", CBS had pulled its affiliation from channel 20, effective in March 1986, even though CBS had earlier stated it had no such intentions; additionally, Bahakel's contract with the buyer of WKAB had stipulated that Bahakel maintain CBS affiliation for WAKA for at least two years. The sale of WCOV to Woods Communications brought forward the switch to January 1, 1986.

That February, WAKA's revamped local news department debuted from a new studio on East Boulevard in Montgomery. For a time, newscasts were split between the Selma and Montgomery studios. Before the end of the 1980s, channel 8 moved its entire operation to Montgomery. However, the station maintains a West Alabama news bureau in Selma.

On July 7, 2011, WAKA announced ambitious plans to purchase WBMM and operate a shared services agreement with WNCF. The plans called for merging all three stations' operations at a new, ultra-modern, HD-ready facility at WNCF's studios. Bahakel was WNCF's founding owner and sold it in 1985 in order to buy WAKA, but retained ownership of the Harrison Road facility, leasing it to channel 32's various owners over the years. WAKA's original Montgomery studio had long been hampered by its location close to downtown, which limited its ability to expand. WAKA moved its operations to WNCF's facility in 2012.

== Programming ==
Until September 2020, WAKA was known as the first station throughout North America to carry Jeopardy! in a broadcast day, airing the syndicated game show as a mid-morning offering at 9:30 a.m. CT with an Inside Edition lead-in out of CBS This Morning (Wheel of Fortune airs on WAKA at its more-common timeslot before CBS prime time). This came to the forefront during James Holzhauer's winning streak, when The New York Times hired a Montgomery-based freelancer to watch WAKA's airing of Jeopardy!, and break the news that he was defeated after his 33rd game, well before that episode aired across the remainder of the markets throughout United States and Canada. Both Inside Edition and Jeopardy! have since been moved to their respective 4 and 4:30 p.m. timeslots.

== News operation ==
In order to become more competitive in the ratings, WAKA expanded its news department with additional personnel, outlying bureaus, and more newscasts. It operates two outlying news bureaus with live broadcasting capability—the West Alabama Newsroom in Selma (on Landline Road/SR 22 Truck/SR 219) and the South Alabama Newsroom in Greenville. A third bureau was later established in Troy ("The Troy/Wiregrass Newsroom"). Those additions along with improved production values helped WAKA maintain its runner-up position in the market. In the July 2011 ratings, WAKA's weekday noon and weekend show at 10 out-rated WSFA in key demographic areas.

In January 2007, WBMM (then separately owned by SagamoreHill Broadcasting) entered into a news share agreement with WAKA allowing the big three affiliate to produce the market's first prime time newscast on the CW outlet. Known as CW News at Nine, the weeknight-only broadcast could be seen for thirty minutes and originated from WAKA's studios featuring most of its on-air personnel. WBMM would begin to have competition to the outsourced broadcast on January 7, 2008, after Fox affiliate WCOV-TV entered into a news share arrangement with NBC outlet WSFA.

That agreement resulted in Montgomery's second prime time newscast at 9 which was only initially seen on weeknights for 35 minutes (a weekend half-hour edition would begin in Summer 2008). On April 16, 2010, WNCF expanded its partnership with the Independent News Network (INN) and launched a half-hour weeknight newscast at 9 on WBMM airing in high definition. As a result, that outlet terminated the outsourcing arrangement with WAKA.

After WCOV's contract with WSFA expired at the end of 2010, the Fox station entered into another news outsourcing agreement with WAKA to produce a nightly prime time broadcast known as WCOV News at 9. This second incarnation of a WAKA-sponsored newscast in prime time features a music theme and graphics package modified from original use on Fox owned-and-operated stations. WCOV News at 9 could be seen from WAKA's primary set at its facility except with separate duratrans indicating the Fox-branded show. Meanwhile, on January 1, 2011, WSFA transitioned its prime-time show to its second digital subchannel (currently affiliated with Bounce TV) resulting in three options for newscasts at 9. At some point in summer 2012, WNCF and WBMM terminated their newscast outsourcing agreement with Independent News Network in preparation for local news production duties to be assumed by WAKA. Unlike most CBS affiliates, WAKA did not air a full two-hour weekday morning show until late-October 2012. Rather, it presented a ninety-minute block beginning at 5:30. Despite the merger with WNCF, WAKA's 9 p.m. newscast remained on WCOV due to that station's stronger Fox lead-in, rather than the smaller lead-in offered by WNCF-DT2's CW programming.

WAKA and WNCF officially debuted their combined local news operation on February 2, 2013. Based out of what was formerly WNCF's studios on Harrison Road, a newly expanded high definition-ready facility features state-of-the-art production capabilities which has allowed WAKA to finally offer local news in high definition. The broadcasts on WAKA and WNCF are known on air as Alabama News Network and shows are simulcasted between the CBS and ABC affiliates on weekday mornings, weeknights at 10, and weekends. The latter two time slots can feature a delay or preemption on one network if national programming runs into them.

WAKA airs its own weekday noon broadcast as well as separate newscasts weeknights at 5 and 6. In addition, WNCF has its own local show weeknights at 5:30 while WAKA offers the CBS Evening News. As a result, the ABC outlet airs World News Tonight weeknights at 6 from a second feed offered by the network (live if significant changes have occurred since the 5:30 feed; otherwise on a delay).

== Technical information ==
=== Subchannels ===
The station's signal is multiplexed:

Subchannels of WAKA
Subchannel	Res.	Short name	Programming
8.1	1080i	WAKA-DT	CBS
8.2	480i	WAKA-ME	MeTV
8.3	480i	WAKA-IO	Ion
8.4	480i	WAKA-QV	QVC
8.5	480i	WAKA-TC	True Crime Network
8.6	480i	WAKA-QU	Quest
8.7	480i	West	WEST
8.8	480i	WAKA-NM	Newsmax2
8.9	480i	Dabl	Dabl

=== Analog-to-digital conversion ===
WAKA shut down its analog signal, over VHF channel 8, on November 28, 2008. The station was the first station in the Montgomery market to broadcast in stereo and is the only one to transmit with a full one megawatt in digital (equivalent to five megawatts for an analog transmitter). Because of WAKA's original digital allocation on UHF channel 55, and a belief by ownership that a return to VHF channel 8 for digital service may create reception issues, WAKA petitioned to the FCC to move its post-transition channel to channel 42 since any channel above 51 would not be allocated for digital television after February 17, 2009.

At that time, the analog antenna and broadcasting equipment were removed from its tower and replaced with digital equipment for channel 42 (digital channel 55 continued to operate via a side-mounted antenna at full power). Digital channel 42 signed-on January 19, 2009, while digital channel 55 signed off on the mandated date on February 17. Although for only a month, the station has the distinction of being the only facility in the country to actually operate two digital channels at the same time (42 and 55) as part of the digital transition. WAKA is the only Big Four station in the market to operate at full power (1 megawatt), using virtual channel 8.
