= WDOD (AM) =

- Chattanooga, Tennessee; United States
- Frequency: 1310 kHz
- Branding: Fox Sports Radio 1310

Programming
- Format: Defunct (was sports)
- Affiliations: Fox Sports Radio; Sporting News Radio

Ownership
- Owner: Bahakel Communications; (WDOD of Chattanooga, Inc.)
- Sister stations: WXCT, WDEF-FM, WDOD-FM, WUUQ

History
- First air date: April 13, 1925
- Last air date: May 31, 2011
- Call sign meaning: Wonderful Dynamo of Dixie

Technical information
- Facility ID: 71349
- Class: B
- Power: 5,000 watts
- Transmitter coordinates: 35°4′54.00″N 85°20′14.00″W

WDOD (1310 AM) was a United States radio station serving the Chattanooga, Tennessee area. The station was last owned by Bahakel Communications out of Charlotte, North Carolina, and offered a sports talk format. WDOD was the oldest radio station in Chattanooga, having gone on the air on April 13, 1925.

== History ==
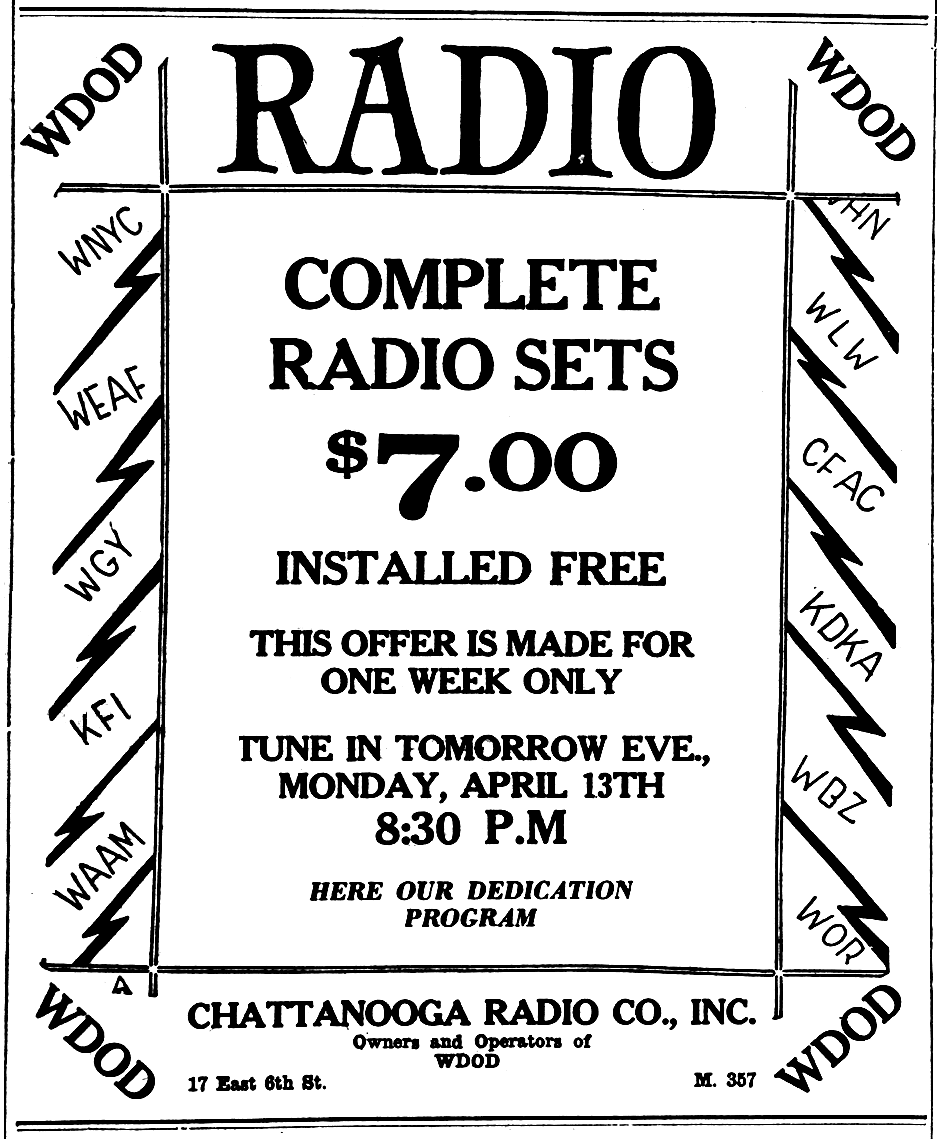
Owned by the Chattanooga Radio Company, WDOD held its debut broadcast on April 13, 1925.

WDOD was first licensed in April 1925 to the Chattanooga Radio Company, operating on 1170 kHz. The call letters stood for "Wonderful Dynamo of Dixie", reflecting a slogan used for the city. The station made its formal debut on April 13, 1925, broadcasting from the Interstate Life building, and featuring a speech by mayor Richard Hardy. Early owners of the station include Norman Thomas and Earl Winger (who owned a crystal radio company, and started WDOD to give people who bought their radios a station to listen to), as well as H. Clay Evans and Interstate Insurance.

Following a series of frequency changes, on November 11, 1928 the station was assigned to 1280 kHz, under the provisions of the Federal Radio Commission's General Order 40. In March 1941, with the implementation of the North American Regional Broadcasting Agreement, stations on 1280 kHz, including WDOD, moved to 1310 kHz. From 1948 to 1997 the station was Chattanooga's original country radio station.

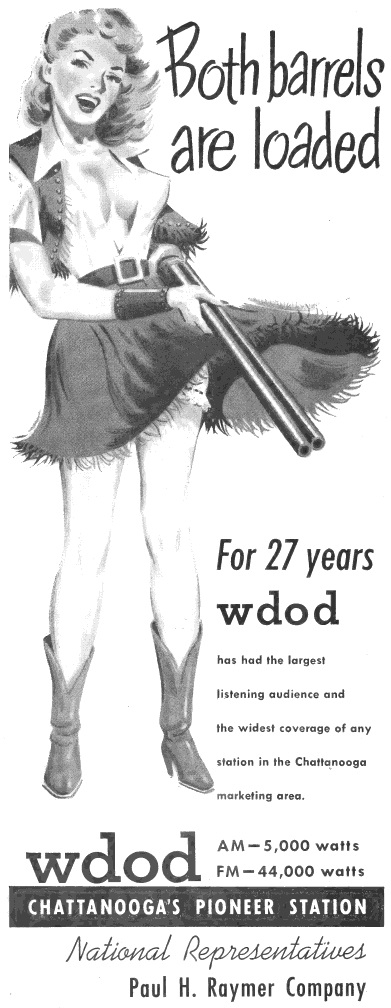
1952 station advertisement.

Bahakel acquired the station in 1963; and added an FM simulcast on WDOD-FM in 1960. The simulcast continued until WDOD-FM changed its format to AAA. WDOD was briefly an affiliate of Air America Radio in 2005–2006. Prior to that the station had an adult standards format. Until 2009, the station derived a portion of its programming from Scott Shannon's The True Oldies Channel from Citadel Media.

After dropping The True Oldies Channel, WDOD simulcast its sister station WDEF (1370 AM), a Fox Sports Radio affiliate, from 7 p.m. to 10 a.m. From 10 a.m. to 7 p.m. the station aired Sporting News Radio's Tim Brando and 2 Live Stews, and the regionally syndicated Paul Finebaum show. 2 Live Stews was subsequently replaced with a local show hosted by Chris Goforth. WDOD was the local radio affiliate of the Chattanooga Lookouts, a minor league baseball team that was the Double-A affiliate of the Los Angeles Dodgers when the station signed off and currently serve as the Double-A affiliate of the Minnesota Twins.

WDOD signed off the air on May 31, 2011. The following day the transmitter property was sold to the Baylor School for expansion. The license was returned to the Federal Communications Commission (FCC), and the station formally deleted on July 13, 2011. Sister station WDOD-FM remained on air with a Contemporary hit radio format.
