= US-101 =

US-101 may refer to:

- U.S. Route 101, a highway that serves the West Coast of the United States
- Lockheed Martin VH-71 Kestrel, U.S. military designation for the AgustaWestland AW101
- WUSY, an FM radio station in Chattanooga, Tennessee
