= WBLJ =

WBLJ may refer to:

- WBLJ (AM), a radio station (1230 AM) licensed to Dalton, Georgia, United States
- WBLJ-FM, a radio station (95.3 FM) licensed to Shamokin, Pennsylvania, United States
