= Drue Smith =

American journalist (1915–2001)

Drue Smith (March 20, 1915 – December 27, 2001) was an American journalist and broadcaster born in Chattanooga, Tennessee She married her husband, Roy Blaney Smith, on September 6, 1934, and later on in their life gave birth to their daughter Drucilla Smith Fuller. Drue Smith died on December 27, 2001, as a result of heart failure.

== Early life ==
Tommie Drue Henderson was born March 20, 1915, in Chattanooga, Tennessee. She was the only child of Sara (née Muxen) and Jesse C Henderson, who managed a department store.

== Life ==
Drue was interested in journalism throughout her early years at Girls Preparatory School and her college years at the University of Chattanooga. Her career in journalism began when a teacher told her to write about the school events that were taking place for her local newspaper. As a result of doing this, Drue Smith became inspired to write as a career and for a living. She wrote columns for the Chattanooga Free Press during a time when women weren't really in the journalism industry later on in her career.

As a native Chattanoogan, she wrote for both papers there before beginning her broadcast career. She was society editor of The Chattanooga Times, the parent newspaper to The New York Times. Her mentors while at that paper included Adolph Ochs (who later started The New York Times) and Roy McDonald.

In 1948, Drue Smith entered the radio business with the show "The Party Line" for the Chattanooga WAPO broadcast. She hosted the senator on WAPO where she gave Estes Kefauver the legendary coonskin cap that he later took on the road in his presidential campaign. She moved her show to WDOD, then to WDEF, where she was named public affairs director. She appeared on WDEF-TV on its first day of broadcast in 1954, presenting Drue’s Party Line. Through her own show, she was able to have guests such as the First Lady at the time, Margaret Truman, the Tennessee Governor, Gordon Browning, and the Senator, Estes Kefauver.

At that time, she was the only woman member (honorary) of the Tennessee National Guard. She traveled by military aircraft to inspect their summer active duty camp and report on their activities. In 1962, President John F. Kennedy appointed her to represent Tennessee on the Defense Advisory Committee on Women in the Services.

In 1954, she served as an advisor to the governor at the time, Frank Clement, and was also named to the chair of the American Women in Radio and Television, which was a cause that pushed for women to be more involved in the nation's media. She also was a contributor to NBC’s Monitor, ABC’s Flair and CBS’ Accent and In-Person, similar in format to today's National Public Radio news and information shows. She stayed in Nashville to cover the Tennessee General Assembly for WLAC radio and the Tennessee Radio Network. During this time she was still doing shows on both WDEF radio and television.

She was the first woman to cover the statehouse full-time and she became the first woman to chair the Capitol Hill Press Corps and the first women to ever cover Capitol Hill along with the Governor's Office. In 2001, the Legislature named the Capitol Press Room for her. Smith was also an active member of the Middle Tennessee Chapter of the Society of Professional Journalists. She was their first woman member and first woman president. In 1997, the group named their journalism scholarship in her honor.

== Awards ==
In a 1984 joint resolution, the General Assembly named Drue Smith their 133rd member. She did not have a vote or per diem but formed close working relationships with many prominent lawmakers for more than 30 years. In 1985, the assembly also named Drue Smith their reporter laureate.

In 1989, Whit Adamson, executive director, Tennessee Association of Broadcasters, presented Drue Smith with a lifetime membership to mark her outstanding lifetime service to the broadcasting industry.

Drue Smith was inducted into the Tennessee Radio Hall of Fame in 2013.

In 2001, the Capitol Press Room was named for her months before her death.

Smith has been named National Broadcaster of the Year by American Women in Radio and TV.

She has also been named Woman of the Year by various organizations: the Business and Professional Women's Club, the Tennessee Press Women, the Pilot Club and the Altrusa Club.
