= WYYU =

- Dalton, Georgia; United States
- Broadcast area: Northwest Georgia
- Frequency: 104.5 MHz
- Branding: Mix 104.5

Programming
- Format: Adult contemporary
- Affiliations: Westwood One

Ownership
- Owner: North Georgia Radio Group, L.P.
- Sister stations: WBLJ , WOCE

History
- First air date: April 28, 1995
- Former call signs: WAKP (1995)

Technical information
- Licensing authority: FCC
- Facility ID: 54517
- Class: A
- ERP: 6,000 watts
- HAAT: 100 meters (330 ft)
- Transmitter coordinates: 34°49′42.00″N 84°53′41.00″W

Links
- Public license information: Public file; LMS
- Webcast: Listen live
- Website: mixx1045.com

WYYU (104.5 FM, "Mix 104.5") is a radio station broadcasting an adult contemporary music format, and licensed to Dalton, Georgia, United States. The station is owned by North Georgia Radio Group, L.P. and features programming from Westwood One.

The station can be heard over much of northwest Georgia, and around and east of Chattanooga in southeast Tennessee. It transmits from the ridge northeast of Dalton and northwest of Chatsworth, near Georgia 286. Its studios and transmitter are separately located in Dalton.

== History ==
The station went on the air as WAKP on April 28, 1995. On June 1, 1995, the station changed its call sign to the current WYYU.
