= WRXR-FM =

- Walden, Tennessee; United States
- Broadcast area: Chattanooga metropolitan area
- Frequency: 103.7 MHz (HD Radio)
- Branding: Rock 103.7

Programming
- Language: English
- Format: Active rock
- Subchannels: HD2: Christian radio

Ownership
- Owner: Audacy, Inc.; (Audacy License, LLC)
- Sister stations: WKXJ; WLND; WUSY

History
- First air date: June 8, 1966; 60 years ago
- Former call signs: WHNR (1964–74); WBMC-FM (1974–86); WTRZ-FM (1986–2007); WKZP (2007–08); WURV (2008–09); WKXJ (2009-25)

Technical information
- Licensing authority: FCC
- Facility ID: 72375
- Class: C3
- ERP: 25,000 watts
- HAAT: 89 meters (292 ft)
- Transmitter coordinates: 35.126°N 85.290°W
- Translators: HD2: 99.9 W260AJ (Ringgold, Georgia); HD2: 104.7 W284AE (Chattanooga)

Links
- Public license information: Public file; LMS
- Webcast: Listen live (via Audacy)
- Website: www.audacy.com/rock1037

WRXR-FM (103.7 MHz) is a commercial radio station licensed to Walden, Tennessee, United States, broadcasting to the Chattanooga, Tennessee, area. WRXR broadcasts an active rock music format branded as "Rock 103.7". WRXR was the second station in Chattanooga to start broadcasting in HD radio. It is owned by Audacy, Inc. Its studios are located on Old Lee Road in Chattanooga, and its transmitter is located in Red Bank.

== History ==
The station was originally known as WOWE and played rock and heavy metal music under the name "Rock 105". The station changed call letters to WLMX in December 1986 and went under the name "Lite Mix 105".

On September 15, 1999, Cumulus Broadcasting changed WLMX back to "Rock 105, The Rock of Chattanooga". Sammy George, Cumulus market manager, described the new active rock format as "radio with an attitude." Artists included Metallica, Pearl Jam, AC/DC and Nirvana. Programming also included NASCAR and Lex and Terry in the morning. The other Cumulus stations at that time were WUSY, WKXJ, WLMX (AM), & WLOV.

In 2000, Cumulus announced it would buy 11 radio stations in 4 markets from iHeartMedia (then known as Clear Channel Communications) in exchange for 25 radio stations in 5 markets plus cash as a part of that company's merger with AMFM Incorporated.

On November 1, 2017, iHeartMedia announced that WRXR, along with all of their sister stations in Chattanooga and Richmond, would be sold to Entercom as part of that company's merger with CBS Radio. The sale was completed on December 19, 2017.

On May 16, 2025, Audacy announced that WRXR's active rock format would be moving to 103.7 to increase coverage range and on a stronger frequency on May 23, with KISS-FM moving to the weaker 105.5 signal. The station has been failing to go above a 2 share, with the recent books, the March 2025 books, showing that it registered a 2.9 share.
