= Estes Kefauver =

American politician (1903–1963)

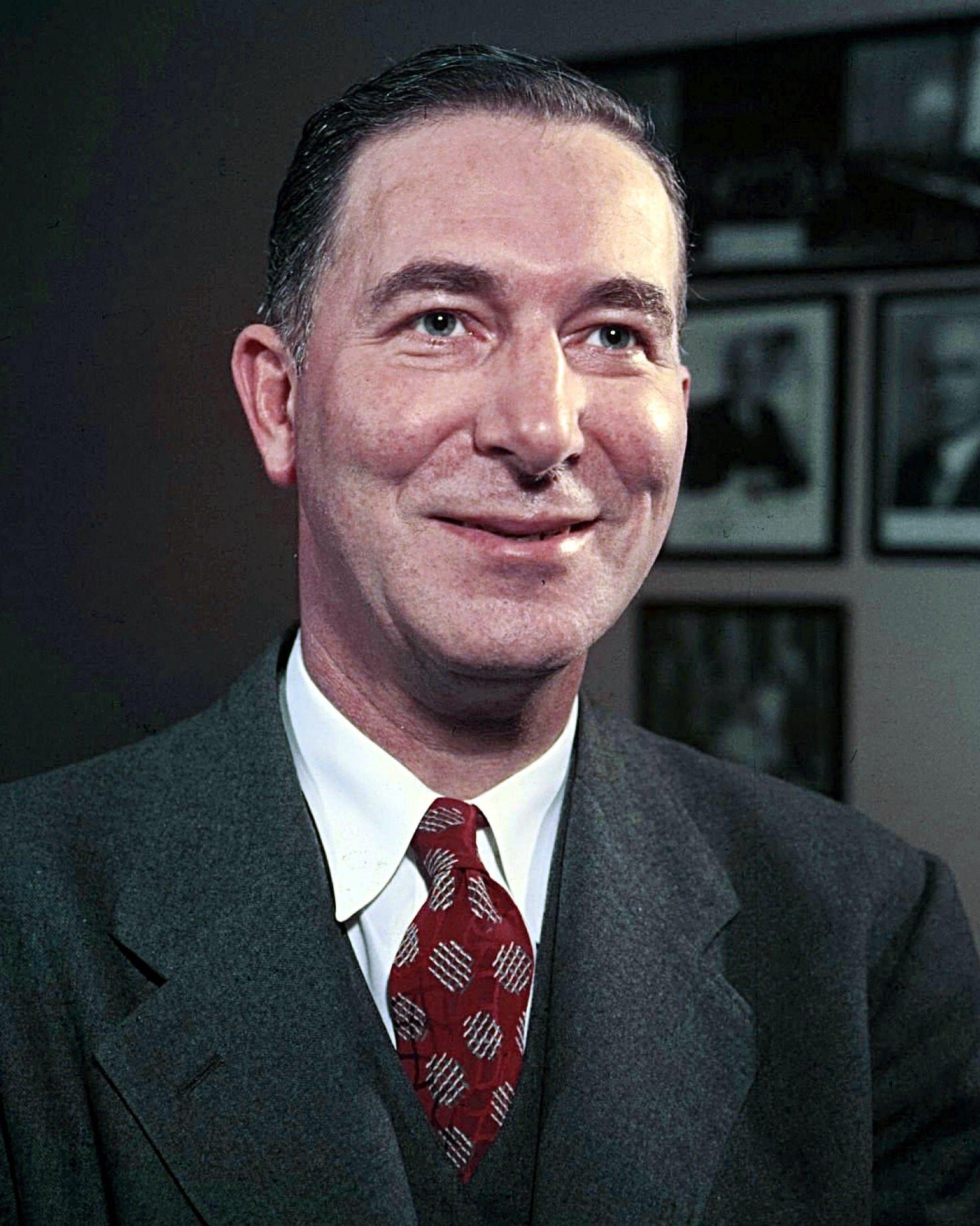
- Kefauver in 1951

United States Senator from Tennessee
- In office January 3, 1949 – August 10, 1963
- Preceded by: Tom Stewart
- Succeeded by: Herbert S. Walters

Member of the U.S. House of Representatives from Tennessee's 3rd district
- In office September 13, 1939 – January 3, 1949
- Preceded by: Sam D. McReynolds
- Succeeded by: James B. Frazier Jr.

Personal details
- Born: Carey Estes Kefauver; July 26, 1903 Madisonville, Tennessee, U.S.
- Died: August 10, 1963 (aged 60) Bethesda, Maryland, U.S.
- Party: Democratic
- Spouse: Nancy Patterson Pigott (m. 1935)
- Children: 4
- Education: University of Tennessee (BA); Yale University (LLB)

Carey Estes Kefauver (/ˈɛstɪs ˈkiːfɔːvər/; July 26, 1903 – August 10, 1963) was an American politician from Tennessee. A member of the Democratic Party, he served in the U.S. House of Representatives from 1939 to 1949 and in the U.S. Senate from 1949 until his death in 1963. He was the winner of most of the 1952 Democratic Party presidential primaries, though he was not nominated at the convention.

After leading a much-publicized investigation into organized crime in the early 1950s, he twice sought his party's nomination for President of the United States. In 1956, he was selected at the Democratic National Convention to be the running mate of presidential nominee Adlai Stevenson. He continued to hold his U.S. Senate seat after the Stevenson–Kefauver ticket lost to the Eisenhower–Nixon ticket. Kefauver was named chair of the U.S. Senate Antitrust and Monopoly Subcommittee of the Senate Judiciary Committee in 1957 and served as its chairman until his death.

== Early life ==
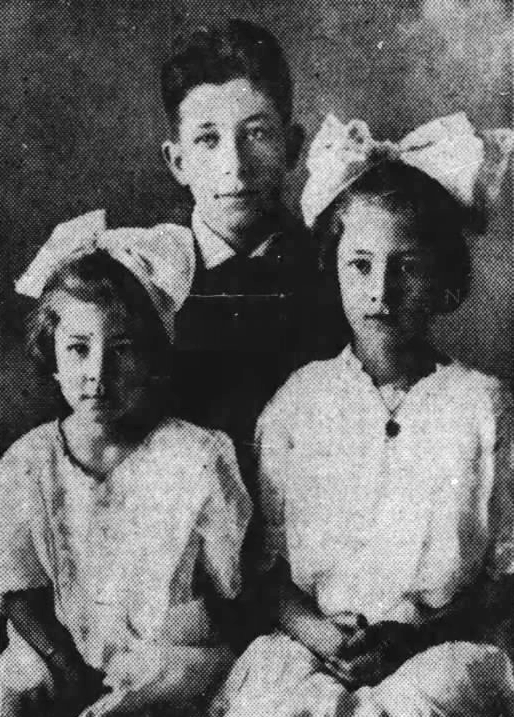
Estes Kefauver aged 10 in 1913 with two of his sisters

Carey Estes Kefauver was born in Madisonville, Tennessee, the son of local hardware merchant Robert Cooke Kefauver and his wife Phredonia Bradford Estes. Kefauver was introduced to politics at an early age when his father served as mayor of their hometown. The elder Kefauver would later be an active and enthusiastic helper in his son's campaigns until his death in 1958 at the age of 87.

Kefauver attended the University of Tennessee and received his Bachelor of Arts degree in 1924. He was a tackle and guard on his college football team. He taught mathematics and coached football at a Hot Springs, Arkansas, high school for a year before going on to Yale Law School, from which he earned an LL.B. cum laude in 1927.

Kefauver practiced law in Chattanooga for the next twelve years, beginning with the firm of Cooke, Swaney & Cooke, and eventually becoming a partner in Sizer, Chambliss & Kefauver.

In 1935, he married Nancy Pigott (born January 21, 1911, in Helensburgh, Dunbartonshire, UK), the daughter of British-American engineer Sir Stephen Pigott, whom he had met during her visit to relatives in Chattanooga. A graduate of the Glasgow School of Art with a budding career as an artist, she changed focus after her marriage and worked diligently and effectively for her husband's campaigns. The couple raised four children, one of them adopted. Mrs. Kefauver died November 20, 1967.

Moved by his role as attorney for the Chattanooga News, Kefauver became interested in local politics and sought election to the Tennessee Senate in 1938. He lost but in 1939 spent two months as Finance and Taxation Commissioner under the newly elected governor Prentice Cooper. When Congressman Sam D. McReynolds of Tennessee's 3rd congressional district, which included Chattanooga, died in 1939, Kefauver was elected to succeed him in the House.

== Political career ==
=== U.S. House of Representatives ===
Kefauver was elected to five terms in the House of Representatives as a Democrat. As a member of the House during President Franklin D. Roosevelt's time in office, Kefauver distinguished himself from the other Democrats in Tennessee's congressional delegation, most of whom were conservatives, by becoming a staunch supporter of the President's New Deal legislation. In particular, he backed the controversial Tennessee Valley Authority and was best known for his successful bid to rebuff the efforts of Tennessee Senator Kenneth McKellar to gain political control over the agency.

As a member of the House, "Kefauver began to manifest his concern over the growing concentration of economic power in the United States", concentrating much of his legislative efforts on congressional reform and anti-monopoly measures. Among the committees Kefauver chaired was the House Select Committee on Small Business, which investigated economic concentration in the U.S. business world in 1946. That same year, Kefauver also introduced legislation to plug loopholes in the Clayton Antitrust Act.

In a May 1948 article, which appeared in the American Economic Review, Kefauver also proposed that more staff and money be allocated to the Antitrust Division of the Justice Department, and to the Federal Trade Commission; that new legislation to make it easier to prosecute big corporations be enacted; and recommended the danger of monopolies should be publicized more.

The Kefauver investigation into television and juvenile delinquency in the mid-1950s led to an even more intensive investigation in the early 1960s. The new probe came about after people became increasingly concerned over juvenile violence, and the possibility of this behavior being related to violent television programs.

His progressive stances on the issues put Kefauver in direct competition with E. H. Crump, the former U.S. Congressman, mayor of Memphis, and boss of the state's Democratic Party, when he chose to seek the Democratic nomination for the U.S. Senate in 1948. During the primary, Crump and his allies accused Kefauver of being a "fellow traveler" and of working for the "pinkos and communists" with the stealth of a raccoon. In a televised speech given in Memphis, in which he responded to such charges, Kefauver put on a coonskin cap and proudly proclaimed, "I may be a pet coon, but I'm not Boss Crump's pet coon."

To win election to the Senate, Kefauver defeated the incumbent Tom Stewart in the 1948 Democratic primary. Kefauver was backed by the influential editor Edward J. Meeman of the Memphis Press-Scimitar, who had long fought the Crump machine for its corruption and stranglehold over Memphis politics. After he went on to win both the primary and the election, he adopted the cap as his trademark and wore it in every successive campaign. He received the cap from journalist Drue Smith.

Kefauver was unique in Tennessee politics in his outspoken liberal views, a stand which established a permanent bloc of opposition to him in the state. Kefauver's success—despite his liberal views—was predicated largely on his support by the Nashville Tennessean, a consistently liberal newspaper that served as a focus for anti-Crump sentiment in the state. His constituency included many prominent citizens, whose views were considerably less liberal than his, but who admired him for his integrity.

Despite opposition from the Crump machine, Kefauver won the Democratic nomination, which in those days was tantamount to election in Tennessee. His victory is widely seen as the beginning of the end for the Crump machine's influence in statewide politics.

Once in the Senate, Kefauver began to make a name for himself as a crusader for consumer protection laws and antitrust legislation. On civil rights, he was ambivalent: he admitted later that he had difficulty adjusting to the idea of racial integration, and in 1960 he held out to the last in favor of permitting cross-examination of black complainants in voting rights cases. Despite this fact, Kefauver supported the civil rights program generally, and consistently supported organized labor and other movements considered liberal in the South at that time.

=== U.S. Senate ===
==== Overview ====
After being elected to the U.S. Senate in 1948, Kefauver guided the Celler–Kefauver Act of 1950, which amended the Clayton Act by plugging loopholes that allowed a corporation to purchase a competing firm's assets, through the U.S. Senate. Between 1957 and 1963, his U.S. Senate Antitrust and Monopoly Subcommittee investigated concentration in the U.S. economy, industry by industry, and it issued a report exposing monopoly prices in the steel, automotive, bread and pharmaceutical industries. In May 1963, Kefauver's subcommittee concluded that within monopolized U.S. industries no real price competition existed anymore and also recommended that General Motors be broken up into competing firms.

Kefauver's Antitrust and Monopoly Subcommittee also held hearings on the pharmaceutical industry between 1959 and 1963 that led to enactment of his most famous legislative achievement, the Kefauver-Harris Drug Act of 1962, after Kefauver expressed shock about the excess profits that U.S. drug companies were taking in at the expense of U.S. consumers. Some of what Kefauver's hearings on the U.S. pharmaceutical industry revealed includes the following:

"Witnesses told of conflicts of interest for the American Medical Association (whose journal, for example, received millions of dollars in drug advertising and was, therefore, reluctant to challenge claims made by drug company ads)…The drug companies themselves were shown to be engaged in frenzied advertising campaigns designed to sell trade-name versions of drugs that could otherwise be prescribed under generic names at a fraction of the cost; this competition, in turn, had led to the marketing of new drugs that were no improvements on drugs already on the market, but nevertheless heralded as dramatic breakthroughs without proper concern for either effectiveness or safety."

At that time, the U.S. Food and Drug Administration had limited authority to require efficacy standards or disclose risks. Kefauver was accused of expanding the power of government excessively, interfering with the freedom of doctors and patients, and threatening the viability of the pharmaceutical industry. His legislation seemed likely to fail. However, at the end of 1961, European and Australian doctors reported that an epidemic of children born with deformities of their arms and legs was caused by their use of thalidomide, which was heavily marketed to pregnant women.

These positions made him even more unpopular with his state party's machine than ever before, especially after fellow Tennessee senator Albert Gore Sr., Senate Majority Leader Lyndon B. Johnson of Texas, and he became one of the only three Southern senators to not sign the so-called Southern Manifesto in 1956. He was named in a popular account of the Senate as a Southern Senator who had been excluded from the Southern Caucus due to his opposition to the filibuster and less than impeccable defense of states' rights.

In fact, these unpopular positions, combined with his reputation as a maverick with a penchant for sanctimony, earned him so much enmity even from other senators that one Democratic insider felt compelled to dub him "the most hated man in Congress".

Kefauver also led hearings that targeted indecent publications and pornography. Among his targets were pin-ups, including Bettie Page, and the magazines that featured them.

==== Kefauver committee ====
In 1950, Kefauver headed a U.S. Senate committee investigating organized crime. The committee, officially known as the Senate Special Committee to Investigate Crime in Interstate Commerce, was popularly known as the Kefauver committee or the Kefauver hearings. The committee held hearings in fourteen cities and heard testimony from over 600 witnesses. Many of the witnesses were high-profile crime bosses, including such well-known names as Willie Moretti, Joe Adonis, and Frank Costello, the last making himself famous by refusing to allow his face to be filmed during his questioning and then staging a much-publicized walkout. A number of politicians also appeared before the committee and saw their careers ruined. Among them were former Governor Harold G. Hoffman of New Jersey and Mayor William O'Dwyer of New York City.

The committee's hearings, which were televised live, just as many Americans were first buying televisions, made Kefauver nationally famous and introduced many Americans to the concept of a criminal organization known as the Mafia for the first time. In fact, in 1951, Kefauver appeared as a celebrity guest on the new game show What's My Line? discussing the hearings briefly with the panel, showing how popular these hearings were with early television viewers.

Although the hearings boosted Kefauver's political prospects, they helped to end the twelve-year Senate career of Democratic Majority Leader Scott Lucas. In a tight 1950 reelection race against former Illinois Representative Everett Dirksen, Lucas urged Kefauver to keep his investigation away from an emerging Chicago police scandal until after election day, but Kefauver refused. Election-eve publication of stolen secret committee documents hurt the Democratic Party in Cook County, cost Lucas the election, and gave Dirksen national prominence as the man who defeated the Senate majority leader.

==== 1952 election ====
In the 1952 Democratic primaries, Kefauver won all but three contests, but failed to win nomination No primary Estes Kefauver Hubert Humphrey Richard Russell Jr. Averell Harriman

In the 1952 presidential election, Kefauver ran for the Democratic Party's presidential nomination. In the opening New Hampshire primary, he campaigned against incumbent president Harry S Truman. He wore his coonskin cap, sometimes going by dogsled through the snow. Kefauver won in an electrifying victory. Truman then withdrew his bid for re-election.

Kefauver won 12 of the 15 primaries in 1952, losing two to "favorite son" candidates and Florida to leading Southern Democrat Richard Russell. He received 3.1 million votes, while the eventual 1952 Democratic presidential nominee, Illinois governor Adlai Stevenson, got only 78,000 votes. But primaries were not, at that time, the main method of delegate selection for the national convention. Kefauver entered the convention with a few hundred votes still needed for a majority of the delegates.

The Kefauver campaign became the classic example of how presidential primary victories do not automatically lead to the nomination itself. Although he began the balloting far ahead of the other declared candidates, Kefauver eventually lost the nomination to Stevenson, the choice of the Party leaders in key states. Stevenson, a one-term governor who was up for reelection in 1952, had resisted calls to enter the race, but he was nominated anyway by a "draft Stevenson" movement that had been energized by his eloquent keynote speech on the opening night of the convention. Stevenson lost the general election in November to Republican Dwight D. Eisenhower in a landslide.

==== 1956 election ====
In 1956, Kefauver narrowly lost key primaries, and so again lost the nomination to Stevenson No primary Adlai Stevenson Estes Kefauver Frank Lausche John William McCormack

The 1956 Stevenson/Kefauver ticket lost 41 states, including Kefauver's home state of Tennessee.

In 1956, Kefauver again sought the Democratic presidential nomination. In the March 13 New Hampshire primary, he defeated Adlai Stevenson 21,701 to 3,806. A week later, Kefauver again defeated Stevenson in the Minnesota primary, winning 245,885 votes compared to Stevenson's 186,723 votes. Kefauver was also victorious in the Wisconsin primary.

By April 1956, it appeared that Kefauver would match his spectacular performance in the primaries of four years earlier. But this time, Kefauver had active competition not only from Stevenson, but also from Governor W. Averell Harriman of New York, who was endorsed by former President Truman.

Stevenson got significantly more endorsements and raised far more funds than Kefauver. He defeated Kefauver in the Oregon, Florida, and California primaries and, overall, won more primary votes than Kefauver. After his devastating loss in the California primary, Kefauver suspended his campaign. At the Democratic National Convention, Stevenson was again nominated for president.

Stevenson then decided to let the delegates themselves pick his vice-presidential nominee, instead of making that choice himself. Although Stevenson preferred Senator John F. Kennedy of Massachusetts as his running mate, he did not attempt to influence the balloting in any way, and Kefauver eventually received the nomination for vice president.

Stevenson lost the November election to Eisenhower by an even bigger margin than in 1952.

==== Later career ====
After the 1956 election, Kefauver was considered the front-runner for the 1960 Democratic nomination. In an attempt to gain more public exposure, Kefauver proposed a federal ban on the sale or possession of switchblades in 1957. He timed hearings on the legislation to coincide with a series of lurid articles in the Saturday Evening Post and other periodicals of the day on the use of switchblades by juvenile delinquents and gangs. At each hearing the senator would display a bizarre array of confiscated bayonets, trench knives, daggers, and switchblades, all of which he described to the press as "switchblade knives". However, Kefauver's switchblade bill failed, in large part due to residual bad feelings between Kefauver and other senators. In 1959, the senator let it be known that he was not going to campaign a third time for the presidential nomination. He continued to represent Tennessee in the U.S. Senate; the abandonment of presidential ambitions led to his most productive years as a senator. While he largely faded from the public eye, he earned the respect of congressional colleagues from both parties for his independence and his sponsorship of a number of important foreign and domestic legislative measures.

When he ran for reelection to a third term in 1960, his first and, it would turn out, last attempt at running for office after refusing to sign the 1956 Southern Manifesto and voting in favor of the Civil Rights Acts of 1957 and 1960, he faced staunch opposition for renomination from his party's still-thriving pro-segregation wing. Nonetheless, he won the Democratic primary decisively, receiving nearly double the votes of his rival, judge Andrew T. Taylor of Jackson. Kefauver went on to defeat his Republican opponent in the general election, attorney Bradley Frazier of Camden, by more than a 2-to-1 margin.

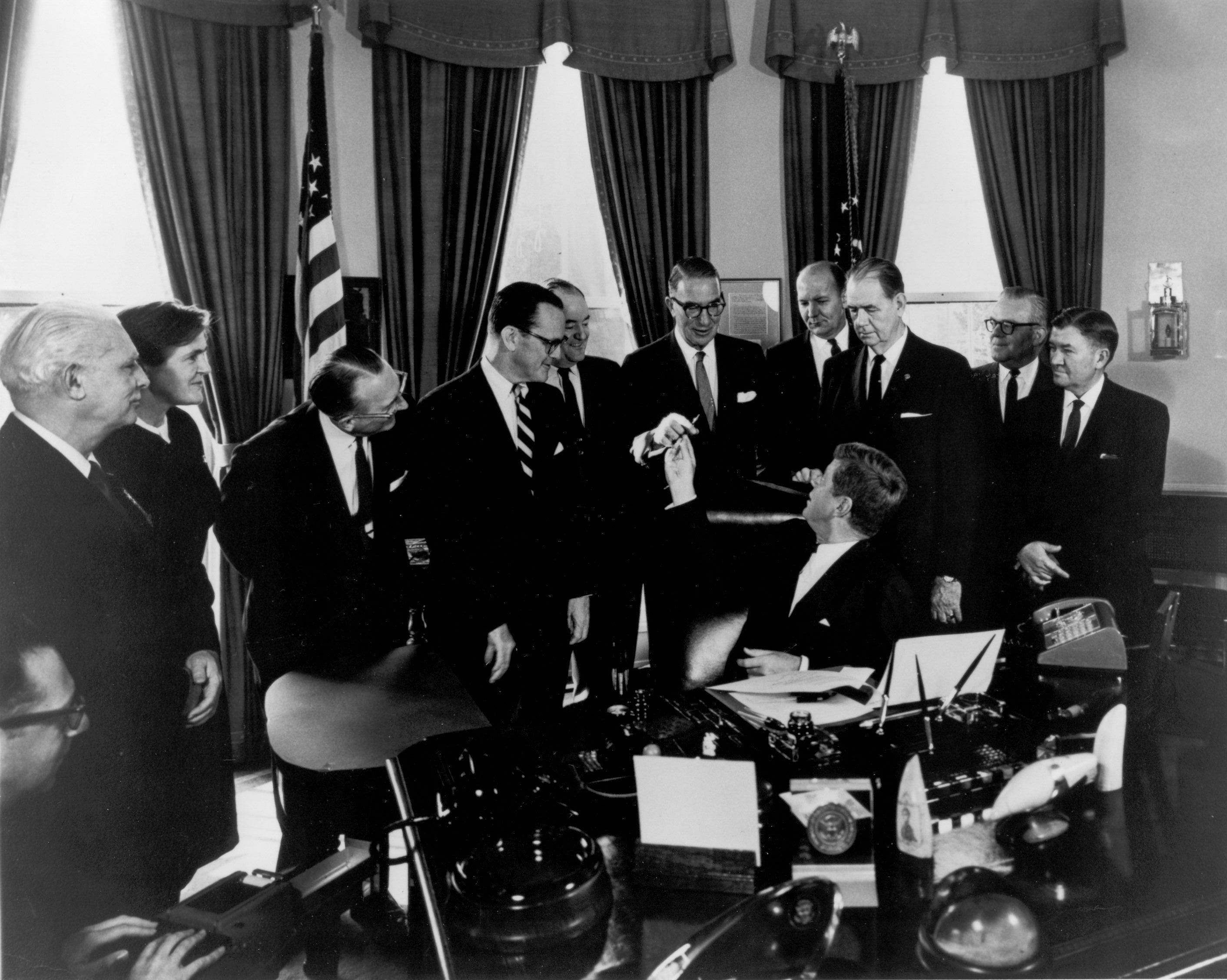
After signing the 1962 Drug Control Act into law, President John F. Kennedy presents the pen to Senator Kefauver

Kefauver voted in favor of the 24th Amendment to the U.S. Constitution. In 1962, Kefauver, who had become known to the public at large as the chief enemy of crooked businessmen in the Senate, introduced legislation that would eventually pass into law as the Kefauver-Harris Drug Control Act. The bill imposed controls on the pharmaceutical industry that required that drug companies disclose to doctors the side-effects of their products, allow their products to be sold as generic drugs after having held the patent on them for a certain period of time, and be able to prove on demand that their products were, in fact, effective and safe.

In signing the Kefauver-Harris Drug Control Act, President John F. Kennedy stated, "As I say, we want to pay particular appreciation to Senator Kefauver for the long hearings which he held which permitted us to have very effective legislation on hand when this matter became of such strong public interest."

== Death ==
On August 8, 1963, Kefauver suffered a heart attack on the floor of the Senate. Two days later he died in his sleep in Bethesda Naval Hospital of a ruptured aortic aneurysm. After a wake in Washington, his body was taken to the First Baptist Church in Madisonville where thousands of mourners paid their respects. He was interred in a family cemetery beside his home.

There was some speculation that widow Nancy Kefauver might stand for election to her late husband's Senate seat in 1964, but she quashed such notions early on. Mrs. Kefauver never considered remarrying, remarking that she had "had too perfect a marriage".

The federal courthouse in Nashville, Tennessee, was renamed the Estes Kefauver Federal Building and United States Courthouse in his honor. One of the libraries at the University of Tennessee was also named for him; his papers are held there. The bridge over Pickwick Dam in Counce, Tennessee is named Estes Kefauver Bridge. One of the two city parks in Madisonville, Tennessee, is named Kefauver Park in his honor, as well the neighborhood Kefauver Hills.

== Electoral history ==
1956 United States presidential election (vice president's seat)

Richard Nixon (R) (inc.) 57.4%
Estes Kefauver (D) 42%
Thomas Werdel (States' Rights Party) 0.2%

Estes Kefauver Tennessee campaigns
Year	Office	Winner	Vote	Runner-up	Vote	Third candidate	Vote	Source
1960	U.S. Senate (TN)	Estes Kefauver (D)	594,460	A. Bradley Frazier (R)	234,053			
1954	U.S. Senate (TN)	Estes Kefauver (D)	249,121	Tom Wall (R)	106,971			
1948	U.S. Senate (TN)	Estes Kefauver (D)	326,032	B. Carroll Reece (R)	166,947	John R. Neal Jr. (I)	6,103	
1946	TN-03	Estes Kefauver (D)	26,779	George Bagwell (I)	2,725			
1944	TN-03	Estes Kefauver (D)	32,497	Foster Johnson (R)	11,541	Ernest W. Forstner (I)	3,894	
1942	TN-03	Estes Kefauver (D)	14,704	Walter Higgins (R)	3,831	Walter Harris (I)	902	
1940	TN-03	Estes Kefauver (D)	35,332	Jerome Taylor (R)	16,099			
1939	TN-03	Estes Kefauver (D)	14,268	Casto Dodson (R)	5,355	John R. Neal Jr. (I)	375	

== See also ==
- United States Senate Special Committee to Investigate Crime in Interstate Commerce, also popularly known as the "Kefauver Committee"
- United States Senate Subcommittee on Juvenile Delinquency
- Comics Code Authority
- List of members of the United States Congress who died in office (1950–1999)
- National Lampoon 1964 High School Yearbook Parody

U.S. House of Representatives
Preceded by Sam D. McReynolds	Member of the U.S. House of Representatives from Tennessee's 3rd congressional district 1939–1949	Succeeded by James B. Frazier Jr.
Party political offices
Preceded by Tom Stewart	Democratic nominee for U.S. Senator from Tennessee (Class 2); 1948, 1954, 1960	Succeeded by Ross Bass
Preceded by John Sparkman	Democratic nominee for Vice President of the United States; 1956	Succeeded by Lyndon B. Johnson
U.S. Senate
Preceded by Tom Stewart	U.S. Senator (Class 2) from Tennessee; 1949–1963; Served alongside: Kenneth McKellar, Al Gore	Succeeded by Herbert S. Walters
New office	Chair of the Senate Interstate Commerce Crime Committee; 1950–1951	Succeeded by Herbert O'Conor
