= WYBK =

- Chattanooga, Tennessee, U.S.; United States
- Broadcast area: Chattanooga
- Frequency: 89.7 MHz

Programming
- Format: Christian radio

Ownership
- Owner: Bible Broadcasting Network

History
- Former call signs: WDYN-FM 89.7

Technical information
- Licensing authority: FCC
- Facility ID: 65216
- Class: C1
- ERP: 100,000 watts
- HAAT: 250 meters (820 ft)
- Transmitter coordinates: 35°10′17.00″N 85°18′58.00″W

Links
- Public license information: Public file; LMS
- Website: bbnradio.org

WYBK (89.7 FM) is a non-commercial radio station broadcasting a Christian radio format. Licensed to Chattanooga, Tennessee, United States, the station serves the Chattanooga area and south-central Tennessee. The station is currently owned by the Bible Broadcasting Network.

== History ==
For many years, FM 89.7 was the frequency for WDYN, owned by Tennessee Temple University of Chattanooga, Tennessee. WDYN began as the campus station for the then-Tennessee Temple College in 1968. In November 2010, Tennessee Temple sold the station's transmitters and frequency to Bible Broadcasting Network for $2.5 million as WYBK. The school retained the studio facilities, and continued to broadcast on the internet. The school subsequently purchased WUUS (AM 980) from 3 Daughters Media for $175,000, and began broadcasting its signal on that frequency on December 4, 2010.
