= WUSY =

Radio station in Cleveland–Chattanooga, Tennessee

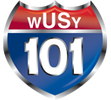
- Cleveland, Tennessee; United States
- Broadcast area: Chattanooga metropolitan area
- Frequency: 100.7 MHz (HD Radio)
- Branding: U.S. 101

Programming
- Language: English
- Format: Country
- Subchannels: HD2: Urban contemporary "Real 97.7"
- Affiliations: Premiere Networks

Ownership
- Owner: Audacy, Inc.; (Audacy License, LLC)
- Sister stations: WKXJ; WLND; WRXR-FM

History
- First air date: August 1, 1961
- Former call signs: WCLE-FM (1961–81); WLCY (1981–82); WQLS (1982–83)
- Call sign meaning: "US" as in the station's branding "U.S. 101"

Technical information
- Licensing authority: FCC
- Facility ID: 12315
- Class: C0
- ERP: 100,000 watts
- HAAT: 363 meters (1,191 ft)
- Transmitter coordinates: 35°12′26.00″N 85°17′10.00″W
- Translator: HD2: 97.7 W249BR (Lookout Mountain)

Links
- Public license information: Public file; LMS
- Webcast: Listen live (via Audacy); Listen live (via Audacy) (HD2)
- Website: www.audacy.com/us101country www.audacy.com/real977 (HD2)

WUSY (100.7 FM "U.S. 101") is a commercial radio station. It is licensed to Cleveland, Tennessee and serves the Chattanooga metropolitan area. The station's radio format is country music.

WUSY's studios and offices are on Old Lee Highway in Chattanooga. The transmitter is off Sawyer Cemetery Road in Signal Mountain.

WUSY broadcasts using the HD Radio format. Its country music is heard on HD 1 and an urban contemporary format known as "Real 97.7" is heard on its HD 2 channel and translator W249BR 97.7 FM Lookout Mountain.

== History ==
On August 1, 1961, WCLE-FM first signed on the air. It was the sister station to AM 1570 WCLE. Because WCLE was a daytimer, the FM station simulcast the AM's programming by day and continued broadcasting at night. At first, the station was powered at 5,100 watts and only served the Cleveland area. When WUSY signed on in 1983, "Big Jon" Anthony didn't have the key to the studio and had to force his way in to place US 101 on the Chattanooga map.

The old studios were at the Osborne Building right off I-75 and have been at their current location off Lee Highway since the 1990s.

In 2000, Cumulus announced it would buy 11 radio stations in 4 markets from iHeartMedia (then known as Clear Channel Communications) in exchange for 25 radio stations in 5 markets plus cash as a part of that company's merger with AMFM Incorporated. Other Clear Channel stations were WLOV (urban contemporary by this time), sports talk WUUS, CHR WKXJ, active rock WRXR (the former WLMX-FM), and oldies WSGC.

On November 1, 2017, iHeartMedia announced that WUSY, along with all of their sister stations in Chattanooga and Richmond, would be sold to Entercom due to that company's merger with CBS Radio. The sale was completed on December 19, 2017.

== WUSY-HD2 ==
W241AF in Rossville, Georgia rebroadcasts WUSY's HD2 channel. On April 2, 2012, this station debuted "The Beat", an urban contemporary format after stunting with "Beat It" by Michael Jackson. The translator's power was increased from 10 to 250 watts.

On November 11, 2014, W241AF/WUSY-HD2 changed format from urban contemporary to classic country, branded as "US101 The Legend 96.1".

On November 30, 2016, W241AF/WUSY-HD2 returned to an urban contemporary format from classic country, branded as "Real 96.1".

On November 26, 2021, W241AF split from simulcasting WUSY-HD2 without notice and rebranded as "Real 100.7 HD2".

On August 1, 2022, WUSY-HD2 rebranded as "Real 97.7", simulcasting on translator W249BR 97.7 FM Lookout Mountain.
