= WLND =

- Signal Mountain, Tennessee; United States
- Broadcast area: Chattanooga metropolitan area
- Frequency: 98.1 MHz
- Branding: 98.1 The Lake

Programming
- Language: English
- Format: Adult hits

Ownership
- Owner: Audacy, Inc.; (Audacy License, LLC)
- Sister stations: WKXJ; WRXR-FM; WUSY

History
- First air date: August 29, 1994 (as WZST)
- Former call signs: WVXA (1992–94, CP); WZST (1994–98); WXKT (1998–99); WKXJ (1999–2007)
- Call sign meaning: "Legend" (former branding)

Technical information
- Licensing authority: FCC
- Facility ID: 72371
- Class: A
- ERP: 1,000 watts
- HAAT: 242 meters (794 ft)
- Transmitter coordinates: 35.088°N 85.363°W

Links
- Public license information: Public file; LMS
- Webcast: Listen live (via Audacy)
- Website: www.audacy.com/981thelake

WLND (98.1 FM) is a commercial radio station licensed to Signal Mountain, Tennessee, and serving the Chattanooga metropolitan area. The station is owned by Audacy, Inc., and broadcasts an adult hits radio format, using the moniker "98.1 The Lake - We Play Anything!" As with many Adult Hits stations owned by Audacy, WLND operates with no disc jockeys. The radio studios and offices are on Old Lee Road in Chattanooga.

WLND has an effective radiated power (ERP) of 1,000 watts, compared with several other FM stations in the Chattanooga area powered at 100,000 watts. The transmitter is on Skillet Gap Road in Chattanooga.

== History ==
=== WKXJ and WZST ===
This station first went on the air in 1990 at 97.3 FM with the call letters WKXJ. The station played a Rhythmic Contemporary format and was branded as "97 Kicks". By 1997, "Kicks FM" was adult contemporary and simulcasting on 103.1 FM. In 1998, Cumulus Media began operating WKXJ under a local marketing agreement, later completing the $3 million purchase from Marson Broadcasting in 1999.

WZST "Star 98", a Top 40 Mainstream station at 98.1 FM, took the WKXJ letters and relaunched as "98.1 KISS-FM". The 97.3 frequency switched to rhythmic oldies as WLOV-FM. WKXJ did well during its six and a half years as KISS-FM.

=== Cumulus ownership ===
In 2000, Cumulus announced it would buy 11 radio stations in 4 markets from Clear Channel Communications (now iHeartMedia) in exchange for 25 radio stations in 5 markets plus cash as a part of that company's merger with AMFM Incorporated.

On June 13, 2007, at 10 a.m., WKXJ flipped to a classic country-formatted station, which moved from WNGA following a sale of that station to 3 Daughters Media. Shortly after the change, the station changed call letters to WLND to match the "Legend" branding.

"The Legend" logo (2007–2009)

On November 17, 2008, the format switched to Christmas music. There was word that there might be a format change after that ended, but the station returned to its classic country format after the holiday format concluded. On September 4, 2009, WLND's former Top 40 format and "KISS-FM" branding returned to the Chattanooga airwaves, this time at sister station WURV (now WKXJ).

=== Hot AC ===
On November 1, 2009, the format again switched to Christmas music as "Chattanooga's Christmas Station". At around 11:45 P.M. on December 25, 2009, after playing "Happy Xmas (War Is Over)" by John Lennon and Yoko Ono, the station switched to a hot AC format, with the branding "Your Life, Your Music, 98.1 LND".

The first song on LND was "Sweet Child o' Mine" by Guns N' Roses. On September 2, 2010, WLND rebranded as "My 98.1".

=== The Lake ===
On September 2, 2011, at Noon, WLND relaunched as adult hits "98.1 The Lake".

On November 1, 2017, iHeartMedia announced that WLND, along with all sister stations in Chattanooga and Richmond, would be sold to Entercom as part of that company's merger with CBS Radio. The sale was completed on December 19, 2017.

On August 30, 2024, WLND temporarily rebranded as "Olivia 98.1" while maintaining its adult hits format. Positioning as "Chattanooga’s Gold Medal Station", the station celebrated Chattanooga native Olivia Reeves, who won the first gold medal for weightlifting for the U.S. in 24 years at the 2024 Summer Olympics with tributes for Reeves’ journey and record-breaking achievement. The station reverted to the lake on September 3.

== Chattanooga Lookouts ==
As of April 2019, WLND is the flagship station of the Minor League Baseball AA Chattanooga Lookouts (Affiliate of the Cincinnati Reds).
