= WBLJ (AM) =

Radio station in Georgia, United States

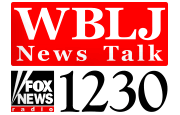
- Dalton, Georgia; United States
- Broadcast area: Chattanooga area
- Frequency: 1230 kHz

Programming
- Format: Talk radio
- Network: Fox News Radio
- Affiliations: Premiere Networks; Fox Sports Radio

Ownership
- Owner: North Georgia Radio Group, L.P.
- Sister stations: WOCE, WYYU

History
- First air date: April 8, 1940

Technical information
- Licensing authority: FCC
- Facility ID: 49233
- Class: C
- Power: 1,000 watts (unlimited)
- Transmitter coordinates: 34°45′23.00″N 84°57′2.00″W
- Translator: 98.3 W252DR (Dalton)

Links
- Public license information: Public file; LMS
- Website: www.wblj1230.com

WBLJ (1230 AM) is a commercial radio station licensed to Dalton, Georgia, United States, and serving the Chattanooga metropolitan area. Owned by North Georgia Radio Group, L.P., it features a talk radio format.

Programming is also heard on FM translator W252DR at 98.3 MHz.

== History ==
WBLJ signed on the air on April 8, 1940. In its early years, it was a network affiliate of the Mutual Broadcasting System.

== Programming ==
Most programs on WBLJ are nationally syndicated, along with local news updates and world news from Fox News Radio.
