= WKOZ-FM =

- Carthage, Mississippi; United States
- Broadcast area: Choctaw/Philadelphia, Mississippi
- Frequency: 98.3 MHz
- Branding: Cruisin' 98

Programming
- Format: Oldies
- Affiliations: ABC News Now

Ownership
- Owner: Johnny Boswell Radio LLC

History
- First air date: 1979 (as WWYN)
- Former call signs: WWYN (1979–1985); WSSI-FM (1985–2003); WCKK (2003–2010)

Technical information
- Licensing authority: FCC
- Facility ID: 41541
- Class: C3
- ERP: 17,500 watts
- HAAT: 120 meters (390 ft)
- Transmitter coordinates: 32°50′0.5″N 89°20′51.2″W

Links
- Public license information: Public file; LMS
- Webcast: Listen live
- Website: www.kicks96news.com

WKOZ-FM (98.3 FM) is an American radio station broadcasting an oldies format. Licensed to Carthage, Mississippi, United States. The station is owned by Johnny Boswell Radio LLC.
