= WUUQ =

Coordinates: 34.973°N 85.633°W

- South Pittsburg, Tennessee; United States
- Broadcast area: Chattanooga, Tennessee
- Frequency: 97.3 MHz
- Branding: Classic Country Q97.3★Q99.3

Programming
- Format: Classic country
- Affiliations: Compass Media Networks; United Stations Radio Networks

Ownership
- Owner: Bahakel Communications; (Jackson Telecasters, Inc.)
- Sister stations: WXCT, WDEF-FM, WDOD-FM

History
- First air date: 1990
- Former call signs: WKXJ (1990–1999); WLOV-FM (1999–2003); WMXF-FM (2003–2004); WMAX-FM (2004–2005); WNGA (2005–2007); WUUS-FM (2007–2008)

Technical information
- Licensing authority: FCC
- Facility ID: 40469
- Class: C2
- ERP: 16,000 watts
- HAAT: 261 meters (856 ft)
- Translator: 99.3 W257AZ (Lookout Mountain)

Links
- Public license information: Public file; LMS
- Webcast: Listen live
- Website: www.wuuqradio.com

WUUQ (97.3 FM) is a commercial radio station serving the Chattanooga, Tennessee area, broadcasting on two different frequencies. The main frequency is 97.3 FM which is licensed to South Pittsburg, Tennessee. 99.3 FM is a translator station licensed to Lookout Mountain, Tennessee with the call-sign W257AZ. The three numbers in the call letters of an FM translator indicate the frequency. This station currently broadcasts a Classic Country format known as "Classic Country Q97.3★Q99.3". These stations are owned by Bahakel Communications. Libby Phillips is General Manager and Dale Mitchell is Operations Manager/Program Director.

WUUQ's studios are located on Broad Street in Chattanooga, and its transmitter is located in the far northeast corner of Alabama, just south of the Tennessee state line.

== History ==
In 1999, Cumulus owned rhythmic oldies WLOV (formerly WKXJ) at 97.3 FM, as well as WUSY, WKXJ, WLMX-FM and WLMX (AM). In 2000, Cumulus announced it would buy 11 radio stations in 4 markets from Clear Channel Communications (now iHeartMedia) in exchange for 25 radio stations in 5 markets plus cash. WLOV, WIIS, WUSY, WKXJ and WLMX-FM were included in those stations going to Clear Channel.

When the 97.3 frequency was still licensed to Clear Channel, WLOV was urban contemporary and also heard on 99.3 FM. The 980 frequency was sports talk. Other Clear Channel stations were WKXJ, WRXR-FM (the former WLMX-FM), WUUS (the former WLMX (AM)), WSGC, & WUSY.

WMAX ("The Max: Maximum 80s") played 1980s music until June 7, 2005, changing its letters to WNGA in December 2005 and its format to classic country.

3 Daughters Media bought WNGA-FM and WUUS from Clear Channel in a deal announced late in 2006. "The Legend" moved to 98.1 FM when Clear Channel sold the station. 3 Daughters Media took over the station on June 22, 2007 and launched a Classic Hits station as U97.3/99.3. The station later changed its moniker to "Classic Hits WUUS" before changing the call letters to WUUQ in December 2008. The call letter change coincided with a switch from locally originated programming to the syndicated "Classic Top-40" format.

On January 27, 2010, WUUQ dropped the classic hits format in favor of a classic country format, adopting the branding "Classic County Q97.3/99.3" with Roger Alan Wade doing voiceover work.

On December 18, 2010 3 Daughters Media sold WUUQ 97.3/99.3 to Bahakel Communications.

== Translators ==
WUUQ also broadcasts on the following translator:

| Call sign | Frequency | City of license | FID | ERP (W) | Class | FCC info |
|---|---|---|---|---|---|---|
| W257AZ | 99.3 FM | Lookout Mountain, Tennessee | 56726 | 250 | D | LMS |
