= WDEF-FM =

Chattanooga, Tennessee; United States
- Broadcast area: Southeast Tennessee, Northwest Georgia, Northeast Alabama
- Frequency: 92.3 MHz (HD Radio)
- Branding: Sunny 92.3

Programming
- Format: Adult contemporary

Ownership
- Owner: Bahakel Communications; (Jackson Telecasters, Inc.)
- Sister stations: WDOD-FM; WXCT; WUUQ

History
- First air date: September 15, 1964; 61 years ago
- Call sign meaning: From its former sister stations, though there is no meaning to the call sign itself

Technical information
- Licensing authority: FCC
- Facility ID: 57827
- Class: C0
- ERP: 100,000 watts
- HAAT: 360 m (1,181 ft)
- Transmitter coordinates: 35.135°N 85.324°W

Links
- Public license information: Public file; LMS
- Webcast: Listen live
- Website: www.sunny923.com

WDEF-FM (92.3 MHz "Sunny 92.3") is a commercial radio station in Chattanooga, Tennessee. The station is owned by Bahakel Communications and airs an adult contemporary radio format, switching to Christmas music for much of November and December. WDEF-FM advertises itself as the "listening at work" station. Its studios are on Broad Street in Chattanooga.

WDEF-FM has an effective radiated power (ERP) of 100,000 watts. Its signal can be heard around Southeast Tennessee, Northwest Georgia and Northeast Alabama. The transmitter is on Hampton Road in Signal Mountain, Tennessee, co-located with the tower for former sister station WDEF-TV Channel 12, along Walden Ridge.

== History ==
WDEF-FM signed on the air on September 15, 1964. It was owned by noted broadcaster Roy H. Park. At first it simulcast co-owned WDEF (1370 AM; now WXCT); by the late 1960s, it had separate programming.

Park installed beautiful music formats on most of his FM stations, and WDEF-FM played instrumental cover versions of popular songs, as well as Broadway and Hollywood show tunes. As the 1980s ended, the format was seeing its audience grow older, while most advertisers seek young and middle aged listeners.

In the early 1990s, WDEF-FM made the transition from easy listening music to soft adult contemporary. Over time, WDEF-FM shifted to mainstream AC music.

Noted morning drive time disc jockey Luther Masingill was WDEF's morning host from December 31, 1940, until his death in 2014. He was on the air longer than any other host in U.S. radio history. He began working at WDEF AM and moved to WDEF-FM when the AM switched to a sports format. In 2012, Masingill was one of the first inductees into the new Tennessee Radio Hall of Fame. On November 12, 2012, Masingill was one of several radio personalities inducted into the national Radio Hall of Fame at a ceremony at the Chicago Museum of Broadcast Communications.
