= WDYN =

Coordinates: 34°57′54″N 85°18′00″W

- Rossville, Georgia; United States
- Broadcast area: Chattanooga, Tennessee
- Frequency: 980 kHz

Programming
- Format: Christian radio

Ownership
- Owner: Carolina University

History
- First air date: 1958 (WRIP)
- Former call signs: WUUS, WLMX, WGVT, WRIP
- Former frequencies: WDYN-FM 89.7 MHz
- Call sign meaning: Gospel dynamite

Technical information
- Licensing authority: FCC
- Facility ID: 72374
- Class: D
- Power: 2,500 watts day 45 watts night
- Translators: 94.7 W234CZ (Chattanooga); 94.9 W235AO (Chattanooga)

Links
- Public license information: Public file; LMS
- Webcast: Listen Live
- Website: wdyn.com

WDYN (980 AM) is a radio station broadcasting a Christian radio format. Licensed to Rossville, Georgia, the station serves the Chattanooga, Tennessee area. The station is currently owned by Carolina University.

== History ==
The station signed on in 1958 as WRIP. The call letters were changed to WGVT in December 1986. Next, in February 1989, the station became WLMX. In 1999, Cumulus Broadcasting owned WLMX at 980. In 2000, Cumulus sold WLMX and 5 other Chattanooga-area stations to Clear Channel Communications. The 980 frequency became the sports talk WUUS.

3 Daughters Media bought WUUS from Clear Channel in a deal announced late in 2006, simulcasting WNGA for some time. In January 2009, WUUS 980 AM broke away from the simulcast, becoming Talk AM 980.

From 1968, WDYN had been located at FM 89.7. In November 2010, Tennessee Temple sold the station's transmitters and frequency to Bible Broadcasting Network for $2.5 million as WYBK. The school retained the studio facilities, and continued to broadcast on the internet.

In December 2010, 3 Daughters Media sold WUUS AM 980 for $175,000 to Tennessee Temple University for its WDYN signal.

Former logo

In November 2012, WDYN began broadcasting on a translator at 94.9 FM.

The station was transferred to Piedmont International University (now Carolina University) effective August 10, 2015, as part of their merger with Tennessee Temple University.

== Translator ==
Broadcast translators for WDYN
Call sign	Frequency	City of license	FID	ERP (W)	HAAT	Class	FCC info
W234CZ	(94.7 FM) FM	Chattanooga, Tennessee	200391	250	28 m (92 ft)	D	LMS
W235AO	(94.9 FM) FM	Chattanooga, Tennessee	148230	99	56.8 m (186 ft)	D	LMS
