= WOCE (FM) =

- Ringgold, Georgia; United States
- Broadcast area: Chattanooga metro (southeast)
- Frequency: 101.9 MHz
- Branding: Radio Que Buena

Programming
- Format: Spanish

Ownership
- Owner: Whitfield Communications; (East Tennessee Radio Group III, L.P.)
- Sister stations: WBLJ, WYYU

History
- First air date: 1989
- Former call signs: WSGC-FM (1989–2003); WTUN (2003–2006)

Technical information
- Facility ID: 4059
- Class: A
- ERP: 1,300 watts
- HAAT: 214 meters (702 ft)
- Transmitter coordinates: 34°58′11″N 85°05′10″W

Links
- Website: http://quebuena1019.com

WOCE (101.9 FM, "Radio Que Buena") is a radio station licensed to Ringgold, Georgia, United States, and serving the Chattanooga metropolitan area radio market.

It serves Chattanooga and most of Cleveland, Tennessee as well as Dalton, Georgia, in southeast Tennessee and northwest Georgia. The station transmits from just south of the state line on the large ridge known as White Oak Mountain, north-northeast of Ringgold and south-southeast of East Brainerd.

== History ==
WSGC-FM was an oldies station known as "Majic" that signed on March 1, 1989, by longtime Chattanooga TN radio disc jockey Tommy Jett. It was Chattanooga's first FM oldies station. It was later owned by Clear Channel Communications.

During the WSGC-FM period, Chattanooga broadcaster and Tennessee Radio Hall of Fame inductee, Career Class of 2023, Johnny Eagle served as General Manager from 1991 to 1993.

Later, as WTUN, the station played classic country music. Clear Channel agreed to sell the station to Whitfield Communications in January, 2006. On January 1, 2006, Classic Country "The Legend" moved to WNGA 97.3/99.3 and WTUN then started simulcasting with WNOO. After a few months of simulcasting with WNOO, WTUN 101.9 then changed its broadcast callsign to WOCE and is now a Spanish-language broadcaster.
