= Gordonville, Alabama =

- Town
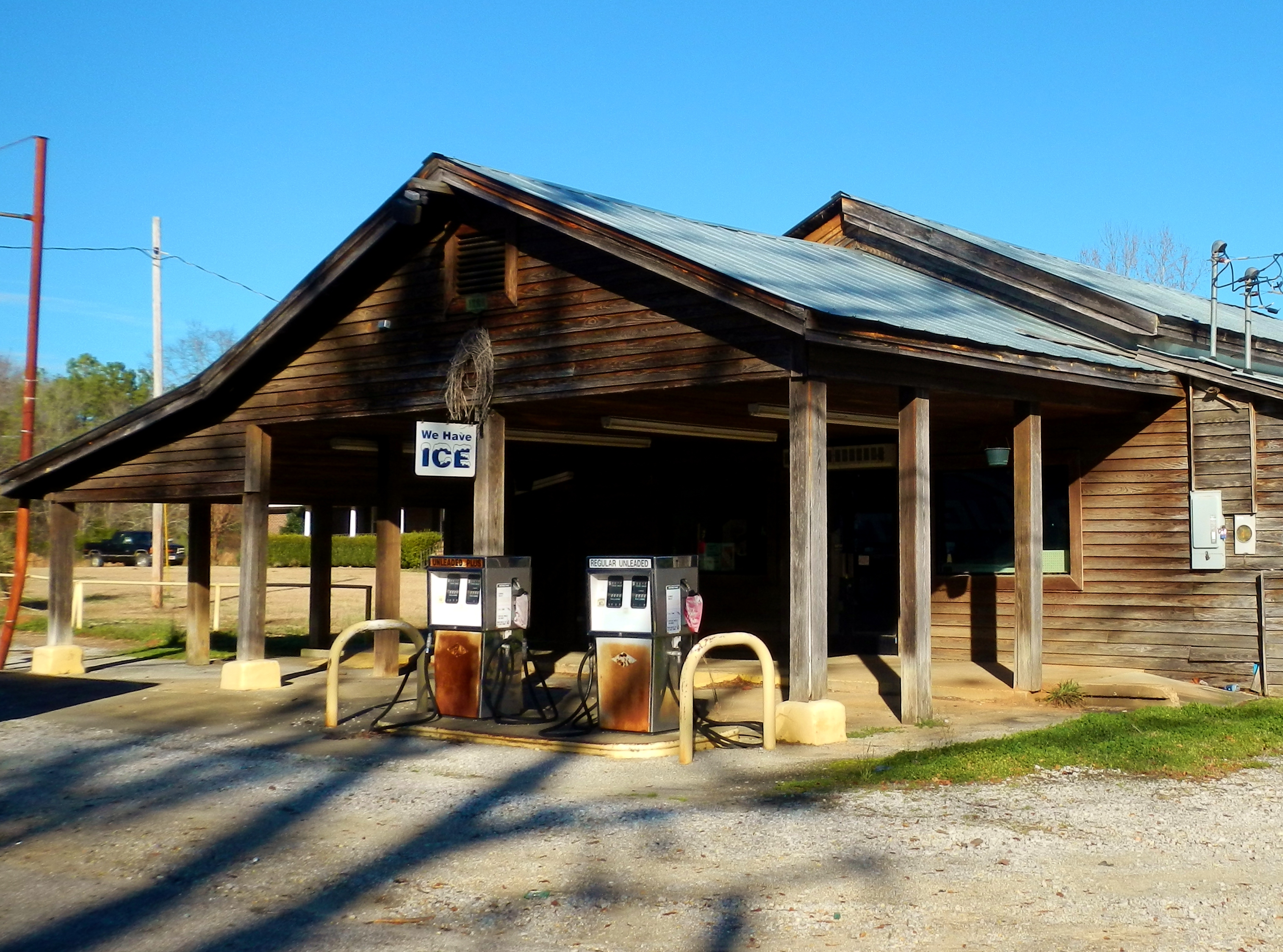
- General store in Gordonville, Alabama

- Location of Gordonville in Lowndes County, Alabama.
- Coordinates: 32°08′21″N 86°41′48″W
- Country: United States
- State: Alabama
- County: Lowndes

Area
  - Total: 5.60 sq mi (14.50 km^{2})
  - Land: 5.54 sq mi (14.35 km^{2})
  - Water: 0.058 sq mi (0.15 km^{2})
- Elevation: 207 ft (63 m)

Population (2020)
  - Total: 245
  - Density: 44.2/sq mi (17.07/km^{2})
- Time zone: UTC-6 (Central (CST))
  - Summer (DST): UTC-5 (CDT)
- Area code: 334
- FIPS code: 01-30808
- GNIS feature ID: 2406593

Gordonville is a town in Lowndes County, Alabama, United States. As of the 2020 census, Gordonville had a population of 245. It is part of the Montgomery Metropolitan Statistical Area. It incorporated effective January 20, 1990.

== Geography ==
According to the U.S. Census Bureau, the town has a total area of 5.7 square miles (15 km^{2}), of which 5.6 square miles (15 km^{2}) is land and 0.04 square miles (0.10 km^{2}) (0.35%) is water.

== Demographics ==
Historical population
Census	Pop.	Note	%±
2000	318		—
2010	326		2.5%
2020	245		−24.8%
U.S. Decennial Census; 2013 Estimate

=== 2020 census ===
Gordonville town, Alabama – Racial and ethnic composition Note: the US Census treats Hispanic/Latino as an ethnic category. This table excludes Latinos from the racial categories and assigns them to a separate category. Hispanics/Latinos may be of any race.
Race / Ethnicity (NH = Non-Hispanic)	Pop 2010	Pop 2020	% 2010	% 2020
White alone (NH)	17	1	5.21%	0.41%
Black or African American alone (NH)	309	231	94.79%	94.29%
Native American or Alaska Native alone (NH)	0	0	0.00%	0.00%
Asian alone (NH)	0	0	0.00%	0.00%
Pacific Islander alone (NH)	0	0	0.00%	0.00%
Some Other Race alone (NH)	0	0	0.00%	0.00%
Mixed Race or Multi-Racial (NH)	0	10	0.00%	4.08%
Hispanic or Latino (any race)	0	3	0.00%	1.22%
Total	326	245	100.00%	100.00%

As of the 2010 United States census, there were 170 people living in the town. The racial makeup of the town was 72.4% Black and 24.7% White. 2.9% were Hispanic or Latino of any race.

As of the census of 2000, there were 161 people, 56 households, and 40 families residing in 70 housing units in the town. The racial makeup of the town was 29.8% White and 70.2% Black or African American.

There were 56 households, out of which 32% had children under the age of 18 living with them, 45% were married couples living together, 18% had a female householder with no husband present, and 27% were non-families. 23% of all households were made up of individuals, and 14% had someone living alone who was 65 years of age or older. The average household size was 2.9 and the average family size was 3.5.

In the town, the population was spread out, with 30% under the age of 18, 11% from 18 to 24, 23% from 25 to 44, 22% from 45 to 64, and 14% who were 65 years of age or older. The median age was 36 years. For every 100 females, there were approximately 83 males. For every 100 females age 18 and over, there were approximately 90 males.

The median income for a household in the town was $17,917, and the median income for a family was $23,750. Males had a median income of $30,625 versus $10,417 for females. The per capita income for the town was $8,585. About 33% of families and 41% of the population were below the poverty line, including 60% of those under the age of 18 and 33% of those 65 or over.

As of the census of 2000, there were 318 people, 112 households, and 84 families residing in the town. The population density was 56.5 inhabitants per square mile (21.8/km^{2}). There were 129 housing units at an average density of 22.9 units per square mile (8.8 units/km^{2}). The racial makeup of the town was 95.91% Black or African American, 3.77% White and 0.31% Pacific Islander. 1.26% of the population were Hispanic or Latino of any race.

There were 112 households, out of which 30.4% had children under the age of 18 living with them, 39.3% were married couples living together, 33.9% had a female householder with no husband present, and 25.0% were non-families. 23.2% of all households were made up of individuals, and 8.0% had someone living alone who was 65 years of age or older. The average household size was 2.84 and the average family size was 3.38.

In the town, the population was spread out, with 28.0% under the age of 18, 9.7% from 18 to 24, 25.5% from 25 to 44, 20.4% from 45 to 64, and 16.4% who were 65 years of age or older. The median age was 35 years. For every 100 females, there were 97.5 males. For every 100 females age 18 and over, there were 92.4 males.

The median income for a household in the town was $10,278, and the median income for a family was $21,250. Males had a median income of $25,375 versus $22,292 for females. The per capita income for the town was $8,948. About 37.8% of families and 42.5% of the population were below the poverty line, including 38.0% of those under age 18 and 69.1% of those age 65 or over.

== Notable person ==
- Francis Gordon Caffey, former United States federal judge

== See also ==
- List of towns in Alabama
