= Bahakel Communications =

American radio and television broadcast company

- Company type: Private
- Industry: Media
- Founded: 1953; 73 years ago
- Founder: Cy Bahakel
- Headquarters: Charlotte, North Carolina, United States
- Products: Television; Radio

Bahakel Communications, Ltd. is an American communications company based in Charlotte, North Carolina, that is wholly owned and operated by the Bahakel family. The company was founded by Cy Bahakel in 1953, who ran it until his death on April 20, 2006, at the age of 87.

Bahakel's broadcasting properties include fourteen radio and television stations in Alabama, Colorado, North Carolina, South Carolina and Tennessee. The group's properties are primarily concentrated on the Southern United States for its television stations, and the Colorado Springs and Chattanooga areas for their radio properties.

== Stations ==
Stations are arranged alphabetically by state and by city of license.

=== Current stations ===
==== Television ====
- (**) - Indicates a station that was built and signed-on by Bahakel Communications.

Media market	State/Dist.	Station	Purchased	Sold	Notes
Selma–Montgomery	Alabama	WAKA	1985	CBS	
Selma–Montgomery	Alabama	WBMM	2011	The CW (via The CW Plus)	
Selma–Montgomery	Alabama	WNCF	2011	ABC	(Note: Previously owned from 1964-1985.) (Note: Owned by SagamoreHill Broadcasting and operated by Bahakel via shared services agreement (SSA).)
Charlotte	North Carolina	WCCB **	1964	Independent	
Columbia	South Carolina	WOLO-TV	1964	ABC	
Myrtle Beach	South Carolina	WFXB	2006	Fox	

==== Radio ====
Media market	State	Station	Purchased	Current format	Notes
Colorado Springs	Colorado	KILO	1984	Active rock	
Pueblo West	Colorado	KRXP	1999	Alternative rock	
Chattanooga	Tennessee	WXCT	1997	Album adult alternative	
Chattanooga	Tennessee	WDEF-FM	1997	Adult contemporary	
Chattanooga	Tennessee	WDOD-FM	1963	Contemporary hit radio	
South Pittsburg	Tennessee	WUUQ	2010	Classic country	

=== Former stations ===
==== Television ====
Media market	State	Station	Purchased	Sold	Notes
Springfield–Decatur	Illinois	WRSP-TV	1982	2007	
Urbana–Champaign, IL	Illinois	WCCU	1982	2007	(Note: satellite of WRSP-TV.)
Terre Haute	Indiana	WBAK-TV	1977	2003	
Greenwood–Greenville	Mississippi	WABG-TV **	1959	2007	
Fayetteville–Raleigh–Durham	North Carolina	WKFT-TV	1996	2003	
Jackson	Tennessee	WBBJ-TV	1966	2026	

==== Radio ====
Media market	State/Dist.	Station	Purchased	Sold	Notes
Greenwood–Greenville	Mississippi	WABG **	1950	2007	
Greensboro	North Carolina	WPET	1987	2001	
Greensboro	North Carolina	WKSI	1987	2001	
Waterloo–Cedar Rapids	Iowa	KFMW	1996	2012	
Waterloo–Cedar Rapids	Iowa	KOKZ	1962	2012	
Waterloo–Cedar Rapids	Iowa	KWLO	1996	2012	
Waterloo–Cedar Rapids	Iowa	KXEL	1958	2012	
