= WXCT =

- Chattanooga, Tennessee; United States
- Frequency: 1370 kHz
- Branding: ALT 98-7

Programming
- Format: Adult album alternative

Ownership
- Owner: Bahakel Communications; (Jackson Telecasters, Inc.)
- Sister stations: WDEF-FM; WDOD-FM; WUUQ

History
- First air date: December 31, 1940; 85 years ago (as WDEF at 1400)
- Former call signs: WDEF (1940–2016)
- Former frequencies: 1400 kHz (1940–1948)
- Call sign meaning: Chattanooga, Tennessee

Technical information
- Licensing authority: FCC
- Facility ID: 57845
- Class: B
- Power: 5,000 watts
- Transmitter coordinates: 35°2′26.3″N 85°20′21.9″W
- Translator: 98.7 W254DB (Chattanooga)

Links
- Public license information: Public file; LMS
- Webcast: Listen live
- Website: www.alt98.com

WXCT (1370 AM, "Alt 98-7") is a commercial radio station in Chattanooga, Tennessee. The station is owned by Bahakel Communications along with WDEF-FM, WDOD-FM, and WUUQ. WXCT has an adult album alternative radio format. The studios are located on Broad Street in Chattanooga.

WXCT’s power is 5,000 watts. By day, it is non-directional, but at night, to avoid interfering with other stations on 1370 AM, it switches to a directional antenna. The transmitter is located in the Moccasin Bend district in Chattanooga. In addition to the AM signal, WXCT is heard on 99-watt FM translator W254DB at 98.7 MHz.

== History ==
On December 31, 1940, the station signed on as WDEF. It originally broadcast at 1400 kHz and was moved to 1370 in the late 1940s. It has long been the sister station to WDEF-FM and was co-owned with WDEF-TV, before the TV station was spun off to other owners in the 1990s.

Luther Masingill was on the station for the Attack on Pearl Harbor and the September 11 attacks.

On October 30, 2016, WDEF changed its call sign to WXCT. It had been simulcast with country music station 97.3 WUUQ. On November 14, 2016 at 8 a.m. WXCT dropped the WUUQ simulcast and changed its format to adult album alternative, branded as "Alt 93.9". It began a simulcast on FM translator W230CN at 93.9 FM. On September 1, 2017, WXCT changed its FM translator frequency from 93.9 MHz to 98.7 MHz, as W254DB and rebranded as "ALT 98-7".

== Translator ==
Call sign	Frequency	City of license	FID	ERP (W)	HAAT	Class	Transmitter coordinates	FCC info
W254DB	98.7 FM	Chattanooga, Tennessee	156865	99	100 m (328 ft)	D	35°7′45.2″N 85°20′1.7″W	LMS
