= WDOD-FM =

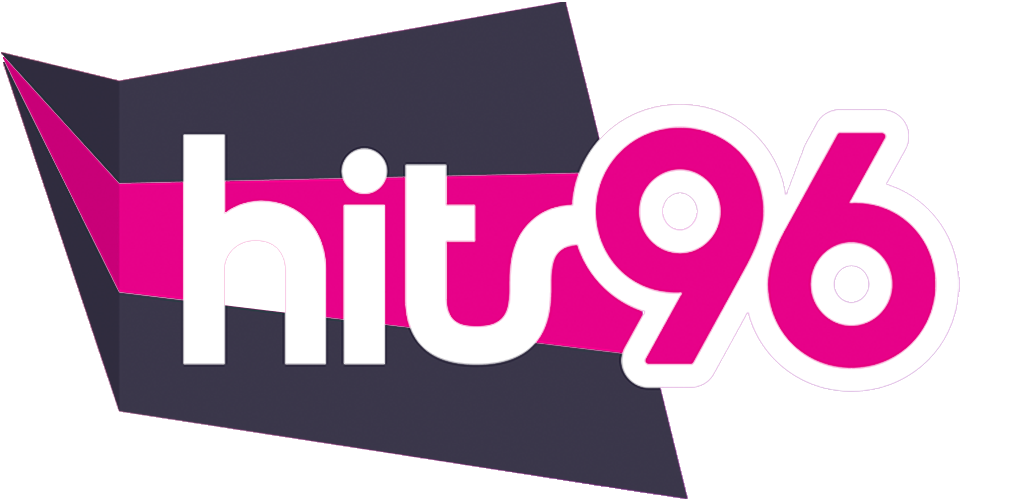
- Chattanooga, Tennessee; United States
- Broadcast area: Chattanooga, Tennessee
- Frequency: 96.5 MHz
- Branding: Hits 96

Programming
- Format: Contemporary hits
- Affiliations: Compass Media Networks; Premiere Networks; Westwood One

Ownership
- Owner: Bahakel Communications; (WDOD of Chattanooga, Inc.)
- Sister stations: WXCT, WUUQ, WDEF-FM

History
- First air date: 1960
- Call sign meaning: Dynamo of Dixie

Technical information
- Licensing authority: FCC
- Facility ID: 71351
- Class: C0
- ERP: 100,000 watts (horiz.); 88,000 watts (vert.)
- HAAT: 336 meters (1,102 ft)
- Transmitter coordinates: 35°9′41.00″N 85°19′5.00″W

Links
- Public license information: Public file; LMS
- Webcast: Listen live
- Website: hits96.com

WDOD-FM (96.5 FM) is a radio station broadcasting a contemporary hit format. Licensed to Chattanooga, Tennessee, United States, the station is currently owned by WDOD of Chattanooga, Inc. Its studios are located on Broad Street in Chattanooga, and its transmitter is located in Walden.

== History ==
=== Early years ===
The station signed on in the early 1960s as a simulcast of WDOD AM. Both stations played country music. Past personalities included Gene Michaels, Earl Freudenberg, Tommy Jett, Jerry Pond, and "Big" Bill Love. The station also carried NASCAR races, and was primarily a country station for a number of years.

At the end of the 1970s, WDOD-FM was known as "D-96" playing top 40 music. At one point, WDOD-FM would play big band music for a short time. The announcer in the legal ID said, "Big bands you remember on WDOD-FM, Chattanooga." Then by around 1981, WDOD-FM would play country music once again up until 1997 when WDOD-FM switched from country music to Triple-A "The Mountain."

The station was considering a switch to mostly classic rock with some new rock mixed in, though WSKZ was already doing this. Research showed that listeners wanted mostly new rock with some classics. One possible approach to this was modern adult contemporary, but this might have hurt sister station WDEF-FM.

Regardless of the market, Triple-A had the same songs representing about half the playlist, but the rest were different on each station. On The Mountain, artists included Jewel, Lynyrd Skynyrd, and Talking Heads. A sample hour of music included Collective Soul, Third Eye Blind, Chris Isaak, Stone Temple Pilots, EMF, Van Halen, Dave Matthews Band, Joan Osborne, Bruce Springsteen, Vigilantes of Love, Loverboy, No Doubt, Aerosmith, and U2. Many songs were familiar and had been hits (an unusual approach to alternative), but they were not heard in the Chattanooga market.

One characteristic that made The Mountain different was attitude, which other area stations did not have. DJs and liners attacked the competition as well as artists such as Michael Bolton and Barry Manilow. Operations Manager Danny Howard did not want to go overboard, and, having worked in AC, he personally felt uncomfortable with making fun of Bolton. But the approach got people's attention.

=== 96.5 The Mountain ===
On March 3, 2008 at Noon, after a brief teasing of a classic country format by the station's deejays, followed by a brief on-air history lecture of the Top 40/CHR format in the Chattanooga area (with said lecture, at the same time, taking potshots at the previous stations for failing for a number of reasons, be it a poor signal or an overall lack of effort on the operators), the station changed to the current Top 40/CHR format, though keeping the name "96.5 The Mountain". The final song on the AAA format was In The End by Linkin Park, while the first song on the CHR format was Stronger by Kanye West.

=== Hits 96 ===
On January 31, 2011, the station began teasing an "upgrade", and that "Version 2.0" of "The Mountain" would debut on February 3 at Noon; at that time the station relaunched their CHR format as "Hits 96". The last song as "The Mountain" was Just Dance by Lady Gaga, while the first song as "Hits" was Higher by Taio Cruz. Howard, at this time the program director, said, "Our new name reflects what we do; play all of today's hit music." General Manager Bernie Barker said, "Hits 96 is not about a lot of change. It’s about a ‘new download’ with some ‘tweaks’. The new logo is more about today." Artists include Lady Gaga, Katy Perry, Usher, Rihanna, Maroon 5, Bruno Mars, and Linkin Park.
