= List of radio stations in Tennessee =

The following is a list of FCC-licensed radio stations in the U.S. state of Tennessee, which can be sorted by their call signs, frequencies, cities of license, licensees, and programming formats.

== List of radio stations ==
Call sign	Frequency	City of License	Licensee	Format
KWAM	990 AM	Memphis	Starnes Media Group, LLC	Talk
KWUS-LP	93.5 FM	Clarksville	Radio-4-US	Classic R&B
KYTN	104.9 FM	Union City	Thunderbolt Broadcasting Company	Country
WAEW	1330 AM	Crossville	Peg Broadcasting, LLC	Talk
WAEZ	94.9 FM	Greeneville	Bristol Broadcasting Company, Inc.	Top 40 (CHR)
WAJJ	89.3 FM	McKenzie	Madisonville Baptist Temple Inc.	Religious
WAKI	1230 AM	McMinnville	Peg Broadcasting, LLC	Sports
WAKM	950 AM	Franklin	Heritage Broadcast Associates	Country
WALI	1280 AM	Dayton	Beverly Broadcasting Company, LLC	Adult contemporary
WALV-FM	95.3 FM	Ooltewah	Radio Training Network, Inc.	Contemporary Christian
WAMP	88.1 FM	Jackson	American Family Association	Religious Talk (AFR)
WANT	98.9 FM	Lebanon	Bay-Pointe Broadcasting, Inc.	Country
WAPX-FM	91.9 FM	Clarksville	Austin Peay State University	College
WASL	100.1 FM	Dyersburg	Dr Pepper Pepsi-Cola Bottling Company of Dyersburg, LLC	Adult hits
WATO	106.1 FM	Oliver Springs	Loud Media LLC	Alternative rock
WAUO	90.7 FM	Hohenwald	American Family Association	Religious talk (AFR)
WAUV	89.7 FM	Ripley	American Family Association	Religious talk (AFR)
WAWI	89.7 FM	Lawrenceburg	American Family Association	Religious talk (AFR)
WAYB-FM	95.7 FM	Graysville	Family Worship Center Church, Inc.	Religious
WAYM	88.7 FM	Spring Hill	Hope Media Group	Contemporary Christian
WAYQ	88.3 FM	Clarksville	Hope Media Group	Contemporary Christian
WAYW	89.9 FM	New Johnsonville	Hope Media Group	Contemporary Christian
WAZD	88.1 FM	Savannah	American Family Association	Religious talk (AFR)
WBAC	1340 AM	Cleveland	East Tennessee Radio Group III, L.P.	Talk
WBBP	1480 AM	Memphis	Bountiful Blessing, Inc.	Country
WBCR	1470 AM	Alcoa	Blount County Broadcasting Corp.	Religious
WBEJ	1240 AM	Elizabethton	CB Radio, Inc.	Southern gospel
WBFG	96.5 FM	Parker's Crossroads	Crossroads Broadcasting, LLC	Conservative talk
WBGQ	100.7 FM	Bulls Gap	Cherokee Broadcasting LLC	Top 40 (CHR)
WBIA	88.3 FM	Shelbyville	American Family Association	Religious Talk (AFR)
WBLC	1360 AM	Lenoir City	Lifetalk Radio, Inc.	Religious
WBMC	960 AM	McMinnville	Peg Broadcasting, LLC	News/Talk
WBNT-FM	105.5 FM	Oneida	Oneida Broadcasters, Incorporated	Adult contemporary
WBOL	1560 AM	Bolivar	Shaw's Broadcasting Co.	Oldies
WBOU-LP	100.5 FM	Nashville	Catholic Media Productions	Catholic
WBOZ	104.9 FM	Woodbury	Reach Satellite Network	Contemporary Christian (K-Love)
WBRY	1540 AM	Woodbury	Volunteer Broadcasting, LLC	Country
WBUZ	102.9 FM	La Vergne	WYCQ, Inc	Active rock
WBXE	93.7 FM	Baxter	Stonecom Cookeville, LLC	Mainstream rock
WCDT	1340 AM	Winchester	Alton Tipps	Adult contemporary
WCDZ	95.1 FM	Dresden	Thunderbolt Broadcasting Company	Classic hits
WCJK	96.3 FM	Murfreesboro	Midwest Communications, Inc.	Adult hits
WCLC-FM	105.1 FM	Jamestown	New Life Studios, Inc.	Gospel
WCLE	1570 AM	Cleveland	Hartline, LLC	Oldies
WCLE-FM	104.1 FM	Calhoun	Hartline, LLC	Adult contemporary
WCMT	1410 AM	Martin	Thunderbolt Broadcasting Company	News/Talk
WCMT-FM	101.3 FM	South Fulton	Thunderbolt Broadcasting Company	Adult contemporary
WCOR	1490 AM	Lebanon	Bay-Pointe Broadcasting, Inc.	Country
WCPH	1220 AM	Etowah	George C. Hudson, III	Oldies
WCPI	91.3 FM	McMinnville	Warren County Educational Foundation	Public affairs
WCQR-FM	88.3 FM	Kingsport	Positive Alternative Radio, Inc.	Christian adult contemporary
WCRK	1150 AM	Morristown	Radio Acquisition Corp.	Classic hits
WCRT	1160 AM	Donelson	Bott Communications, Inc.	Religious
WCRV	640 AM	Collierville	Bott Broadcasting Company/Tennessee	Religious
WCSK	90.3 FM	Kingsport	Kingsport City Schools Bd. of Educ .	Educational
WCSV	1490 AM	Crossville	Peg Broadcasting, LLC	Sports (FSR)
WCXZ	740 AM	Harrogate	Lincoln Memorial University	Country/Bluegrass/Americana
WCYQ	100.3 FM	Oak Ridge	SM-WCYQ, LLC	Country
WDBL	1590 AM	Springfield	Eben-ezer Broadcasting Corporation	News/Talk
WDEB	1500 AM	Jamestown	Baz Broadcasting, Inc.	Contemporary Christian
WDEB-FM	103.9 FM	Jamestown	Baz Broadcasting, Inc.	Country
WDEF-FM	92.3 FM	Chattanooga	Jackson Telecasters, Inc.	Adult contemporary
WDEH	800 AM	Sweetwater	Horne Radio, LLC	Religious
WDIA	1070 AM	Memphis	iHM Licenses, LLC	Urban oldies/Classic soul
WDKN	1260 AM	Dickson	R & F Communications, Inc.	Classic hits
WDKW	95.7 FM	Maryville	Midwest Communications, Inc.	Classic country
WDNT	970 AM	Spring City	Beverly Broadcasting Company, LLC	Classic hits
WDNX	89.1 FM	Olive Hill	Rural Life Foundation, Inc	Christian
WDOD-FM	96.5 FM	Chattanooga	WDOD of Chattanooga, Inc.	Top 40 (CHR)
WDSJ-LP	106.1 FM	Ooltewah	Daystar Media, Inc.	Christian
WDTM	1150 AM	Selmer	Southern Broadcasting LLC	Classic country
WDUC	93.9 FM	Lynchburg	Bowman Broadcasting, LLC	Classic rock
WDVX	89.9 FM	Clinton	Cumberland Communities Communications Corporation	Variety
WDXE	1370 AM	Lawrenceburg	Radio 7 Media, LLC	News/talk
WDXI	1310 AM	Jackson	Gerald W. Hunt	News/Talk
WDYO-LP	104.1 FM	Nashville	Middle Tennessee Jobs with Justice	Variety
WECO	940 AM	Wartburg	Morgan County Broadcasting Company, Inc.	Country
WECO-FM	101.3 FM	Wartburg	Morgan County Broadcasting Company, Inc.	Country
WECV	89.1 FM	Nashville	Community Broadcasting, Inc.	Religious
WEEN	1460 AM	Lafayette	Lafayette Broadcasting Co., Inc.	Southern gospel
WEGR	102.7 FM	Arlington	iHM Licenses, LLC	Hot adult contemporary
WEIO	100.9 FM	Huntingdon	Freeland Broadcasting Co, Inc.	Country
WEKR	1240 AM	Fayetteville	Elk River Media LLC	Country
WEMB	1420 AM	Erwin	WEMB, Incorporated	Unknown
WENK	1240 AM	Union City	Forever South Licenses, LLC	Oldies
WENO	760 AM	Nashville	Disruptor Radio, LLC	Conservative talk
WENR	1090 AM	Englewood	Michael R. Beverly	Adult hits
WENV-LP	97.3 FM	Gainesboro	Save The Cumberland, Inc.	Variety
WEOZ-LP	97.1 FM	Loudon	Frombus Group Inc.	Variety
WEPG	910 AM	South Pittsburg	Spencer Travis Hickman	Classic country
WETB	790 AM	Johnson City	Kenneth C. Hill	Classic hits
WETR	760 AM	Knoxville	Thomas Moffit Jr.	Talk
WETS-FM	89.5 FM	Johnson City	East Tennessee State University	Public, News/Talk
WEUZ	92.1 FM	Minor Hill	Broadcast One, Inc.	Urban contemporary
WEVL	89.9 FM	Memphis	Southern Communication Volunteers, Inc.	Freeform
WEXX	99.3 FM	Elizabethton	Bristol Broadcasting Company, Inc.	Alternative rock
WEYE	104.3 FM	Surgoinsville	Positive Alternative Radio, Inc.	Classic country
WFCM-FM	91.7 FM	Murfreesboro	The Moody Bible Institute of Chicago	Religious
WFCN	1200 AM	Nashville	The Moody Bible Institute of Chicago	Religious
WFFH	94.1 FM	Smyrna	Caron Broadcasting, Inc.	Contemporary worship (Air1)
WFFI	93.7 FM	Kingston Springs	Caron Broadcasting, Inc.	Contemporary Christian (K-Love)
WFGW	106.7 FM	Norris	Blue Ridge Broadcasting Company	Contemporary Christian
WFHG-FM	92.9 FM	Bluff City	Bristol Broadcasting Company, Inc.	News/Talk
WFHU	91.5 FM	Henderson	Freed-Hardeman University	Variety
WFIV-FM	105.3 FM	Loudon	Horne Radio, LLC	Oldies
WFKX	95.7 FM	Henderson	Thomas Radio, LLC, debtor-in-possession	Urban adult contemporary
WFLI	1070 AM	Lookout Mountain	Tri-State Radio Inc.	Conservative talk
WFMQ	91.5 FM	Lebanon	Community Broadcasting, Inc.	Religious
WFSK-FM	88.1 FM	Nashville	Fisk University	Smooth & Contemporary Jazz
WFTZ	101.5 FM	Manchester	Bowman Broadcasting, LLC	Hot adult contemporary
WGAP	1400 AM	Maryville	Loud Media LLC	Adult contemporary
WGBQ	91.9 FM	Lynchburg	American Family Association	Religious (AFR)
WGFX	104.5 FM	Gallatin	Radio License Holding CBC, LLC	Sports (FSR)
WGIC-LP	94.9 FM	Clarksville	Immaculate Conception Parish	Catholic
WGKX	105.9 FM	Memphis	Radio License Holding CBC, LLC	Country
WGND-LP	101.7 FM	Lafollette	Lighthouse Ministries, Inc.	Christian
WGNS	1450 AM	Murfreesboro	The Rutherford Group, Inc.	News/Talk
WGOW	1150 AM	Chattanooga	Radio License Holding CBC, LLC	News/Talk
WGOW-FM	102.3 FM	Soddy-Daisy	Radio License Holding CBC, LLC	Talk
WGRV	1340 AM	Greeneville	Radio Greeneville, Inc.	News/Talk
WGSF	1030 AM	Memphis	Flinn Broadcasting Corporation	Spanish
WGSM-LP	104.7 FM	Madisonville	Spirit Ministries, Inc.	Contemporary Christian
WGSN	90.7 FM	Newport	New Life Studios, Inc.	Country
WGSQ	94.7 FM	Cookeville	Cookeville Communications, LLC	Country
WHBQ	560 AM	Memphis	Flinn Broadcasting Corporation	Classic hits
WHBQ-FM	107.5 FM	Germantown	Flinn Broadcasting Corporation	Sports (FSR)
WHCB	91.5 FM	Bristol	Appalachian Educational Communication Corporation	Religious
WHDM	1440 AM	McKenzie	Forever South Licenses, LLC	Oldies
WHEW	1380 AM	Franklin	SG Communications, Inc.	Spanish variety
WHGG	1090 AM	Kingsport	Information Communications Corporation	Country
WHHG	92.3 FM	Milan	Forever South	Classic rock
WHHM-FM	107.7 FM	Henderson	Thomas Radio, LLC, debtor-in-possession	Adult contemporary
WHIC-LP	100.5 FM	Carthage	Cornerstone Baptist Church	Religious Teaching
WHIN	1010 AM	Gallatin	Brayden Madison Broadcasting L.L.C.	Adult contemporary
WHMT	740 AM	Tullahoma	Bowman Broadcasting, LLC	Country
WHNY	1000 AM	Paris	Forever South Licenses, LLC	Country
WHNY-FM	104.7 FM	Henry	Forever South Licenses, LLC	Country
WHPY-FM	94.5 FM	Bellevue	Kensington Digital Media, L.L.C.	Classic hits
WHQV-LP	103.9 FM	Hendersonville	Jesus Breaks the Chains Church	Spanish Religious
WHRK	97.1 FM	Memphis	iHM Licenses, LLC	Mainstream urban
WHRS	91.7 FM	Cookeville	Nashville Public Radio	Public, News/Talk
WHTR-LP	105.1 FM	Rosemark	HARE, Inc	Christian rock
WHUB	1400 AM	Cookeville	Cookeville Communications, LLC	News/Talk
WIAF-LP	103.9 FM	Antioch	Reaching Heaven Ministries, LLC	Spanish Religious
WIAM-LP	101.1 FM	Knoxville	Calvary Chapel of Knoxville	Religious Teaching
WIFA	1240 AM	Knoxville	Progressive Media, Inc.	Contemporary Christian
WIGH	88.7 FM	Lexington	American Family Association	Religious talk (AFR)
WIGN	1550 AM	Bristol	Mountain Music Ministries, LLC	Bluegrass
WIGS-LP	96.5 FM	Jellico	Jellico Christian Radio	Christian
WIHG	105.7 FM	Rockwood	3B Properties, Inc.	Classic hits
WIJV	92.7 FM	Harriman	Progressive Media Inc.	Contemporary Christian
WIKQ	103.1 FM	Tusculum	Radio Greeneville, Inc.	Country
WIML-LP	100.5 FM	Lebanon	Iglesia Mishkan Lugar de Adoracion	Spanish religious
WIMZ-FM	103.5 FM	Knoxville	Midwest Communications, Inc.	Classic rock
WIRJ	740 AM	Humboldt	John F. Warmath	News/Talk
WITA	1490 AM	Knoxville	WITA, Inc.	Christian/News/Talk
WIVK-FM	107.7 FM	Knoxville	Radio License Holding CBC, LLC	Country
WJAK	1460 AM	Jackson	Thomas Radio, LLC, Debtor-in-Possession	Urban contemporary
WJBE	1040 AM	Powell	Arm & Rage, LLC	Urban contemporary
WJBP	91.5 FM	Red Bank	Family Life Broadcasting, Inc.	Christian
WJBZ-FM	96.3 FM	Seymour	M & M Broadcasting	Southern gospel
WJCR-LP	94.7 FM	Jasper	Jasper Christ-Centered Radio, Inc	Gospel
WJCW	910 AM	Johnson City	Radio License Holding CBC, LLC	News/Talk
WJDT	106.5 FM	Rogersville	Cherokee Broadcasting LLC	Country
WJFC	1480 AM	Jefferson City	Lakeway Broadcasting, LLC	Classic country
WJFS-LP	101.1 FM	Gatlinburg	Gatlinburg Church of Christ	Religious Teaching
WJJM	1490 AM	Lewisburg	WJJM, Inc.	Sports (FSR)
WJJM-FM	94.3 FM	Lewisburg	WJJM, Inc.	Country
WJJT	1540 AM	Jellico	Southeast Broadcast Corporation	Gospel
WJLE	1480 AM	Smithville	Center Hill Broadcasting Corp., Inc.	Country
WJLE-FM	101.7 FM	Smithville	Center Hill Broadcasting Corp., Inc.	Country
WJLJ	103.1 FM	Etowah	Friendship Broadcasting LLC.	Contemporary Christian
WJLL-LP	100.5 FM	Memphis	General Habitat Corporation	Variety
WJNU-LP	96.9 FM	Cookeville	Algood Christian Broadcasting, Inc.	Christian
WJOC	1490 AM	Chattanooga	Sarah Margarett Fryar	News/Talk
WJPJ	1190 AM	Humboldt	Palmer Johnson, Inc.	Regional Mexican
WJQJ-LP	98.3 FM	Gatlinburg	Grace Redemption Church	Contemporary Christian
WJSQ	101.7 FM	Athens	Randall W. Sliger	Country
WJTT	94.3 FM	Red Bank	Brewer Broadcasting of Chattanooga, Inc.	Mainstream urban
WJXA	92.9 FM	Nashville	Midwest Communications, Inc.	Adult contemporary
WJXB-FM	97.5 FM	Knoxville	Midwest Communications, Inc.	Adult contemporary
WJZM	105.1 FM	Waverly	Consolidated Media LLC	Classic hits
WKBL	1250 AM	Covington	Grace Broadcasting Services, Inc.	Christian
WKBQ	93.5 FM	Covington	Grace Broadcasting Services, Inc.	Country
WKCE	1180 AM	Knoxville	Mid-Century Radio LLC	Oldies
WKCS	91.1 FM	Knoxville	Fulton High School	Oldies
WKDA	900 AM	Lebanon	Wilson County Broadcasting, Inc.	Spanish religious
WKDF	103.3 FM	Nashville	Radio License Holding CBC, LLC	Country
WKFN	540 AM	Clarksville	Saga Communications of Tuckessee, LLC	Sports (ESPN)
WKGN	1340 AM	Knoxville	Hodges Media, LLC	Sports (FSR)
WKHT	104.5 FM	Knoxville	SM-WKHT, LLC	Rhythmic contemporary
WKIM	98.9 FM	Munford	Radio License Holding CBC, LLC	News/Talk
WKJQ-FM	97.3 FM	Parsons	Clenney Broadcasting Corporation	Country
WKNO-FM	91.1 FM	Memphis	Mid-South Public Communications Foundation	Public radio / Classical / News/Talk
WKNP	90.1 FM	Jackson	Mid-South Public Communications Foundation	Public radio / Classical / News/Talk
WKNT-LP	104.3 FM	Kingston	Corporation for Radio Education Inc	Variety
WKOM	101.7 FM	Columbia	Middle Tennessee Broadcasting Company	News/Talk/Classic hits
WKOS	104.9 FM	Kingsport	Radio License Holding CBC, LLC	Country
WKPJ-LP	104.5 FM	Athens	Athens Christian Radio, Inc.	Christian
WKPT	1400 AM	Kingsport	Holston Valley Broadcasting Corporation	Sports (ESPN)
WKRM	1340 AM	Columbia	Middle Tennessee Broadcasting Co., Inc.	Adult hits
WKSR	1420 AM	Pulaski	Radio 7 Media, LLC	Classic hits
WKSW	98.5 FM	Cookeville	Cookeville Communications, LLC	Classic rock
WKTH	88.5 FM	Tullahoma	Educational Media Foundation	Contemporary Christian
WKTP	1590 AM	Jonesborough	Holston Valley Broadcasting Corporation	Sports (ESPN)
WKTS	90.1 FM	Kingston	Foothills Resource Group, Inc.	Contemporary Christian
WKVF	94.9 FM	Bartlett	Educational Media Foundation	Contemporary Christian
WKVL	104.9 FM	Greenback	Saratoga Radio LLC	Adult hits
WKWX	93.5 FM	Savannah	Melco, Inc.	Country
WKXD-FM	106.9 FM	Monterey	Stonecom Cookeville, LLC	Country
WKXJ	103.7 FM	Walden	Audacy License, LLC	Top 40 (CHR)
WKXV	900 AM	Knoxville	Ra-Tel Broadcasting Company, Inc.	Religious
WKZX-FM	93.5 FM	Lenoir City	BP Broadcasters, LLC	Regional Mexican
WLAC	1510 AM	Nashville	iHM Licenses, LLC	News/Talk
WLAF	1450 AM	La Follette	Stair Company Inc.	Southern gospel
WLAR	1450 AM	Athens	Randall W. Sliger	Classic hits
WLBX-LP	107.7 FM	Decherd	Decherd Christian Center	Gospel
WLCD-LP	98.7 FM	Jackson	Lane College	Blues/Oldies/Jazz
WLCT	102.1 FM	Lafayette	Lafayette Broadcasting Co., Inc.	Country
WLFM	103.9 FM	Lawrenceburg	Educational Media Foundation	Contemporary Christian (K-Love)
WLFP	99.7 FM	Memphis	Audacy License, LLC	Country
WLHR-LP	97.9 FM	Maryville	East Maryville Baptist Church	Contemporary Christian
WLIJ	1580 AM	Shelbyville	Hopkins Farms Broadcasting Inc.	Classic country
WLIK	1270 AM	Newport	WLIK, Inc	Oldies
WLIL	730 AM	Lenoir City	Fowlers Holdings LLLP	Country
WLIV	920 AM	Livingston	Stonecom Cookeville, LLC	Country
WLLX	97.5 FM	Lawrenceburg	Roger Wright dba Prospect Communications	Country; News, Weather
WLMR	1450 AM	Chattanooga	Grace Media, Inc.	Religious
WLMU	91.3 FM	Harrogate	Lincoln Memorial University	Variety
WLND	98.1 FM	Signal Mountain	Audacy License, LLC	Adult hits
WLNQ	104.7 FM	White Pine	Bristol Broadcasting Company, Inc.	Country
WLNT-LP	96.1 FM	Loudon	Community Radio of Loudon County Incorporated	Traditional Country/Sports
WLNU-LP	107.1 FM	Lenoir City	J.W. McGhee Foundation for Broadcast Arts	Traditional Country/Sports
WLOD	1140 AM	Loudon	Radio Loudon LLC	Classic country
WLOK	1340 AM	Memphis	WLOK Radio, Inc.	Urban contemporary gospel
WLQK	95.9 FM	Livingston	Stonecom Cookeville, LLC	Adult contemporary
WLRM	1380 AM	Millington	CPT & T Radio Station, Inc.	Blues
WLTD-LP	103.9 FM	Dickson	Dickson Omega Radio	Christian
WLVS-FM	106.5 FM	Clifton	Gold Coast Broadcasting Co.	Adult contemporary
WLVU	97.1 FM	Belle Meade	Educational Media Foundation	Contemporary Christian (K-Love)
WLXA	98.3 FM	Loretto	Radio 7 Media, LLC	Country
WLZK	94.1 FM	Paris	Forever South Licenses, LLC	Hot adult contemporary
WMAK	1570 AM	Lobelville	Nunley Media Group, LLC	Country
WMBW	88.9 FM	Chattanooga	The Moody Bible Institute of Chicago	Religious
WMC	790 AM	Memphis	Audacy License, LLC	Sports gambling (BetQL/ISN)
WMCH	1260 AM	Church Hill	Media Link, Incorporated	Religious
WMCP	1280 AM	Columbia	Radio Maria, Inc.	Country
WMCT	1390 AM	Mountain City	Johnson County Broadcasting, Inc.	Classic country
WMDA-LP	93.5 FM	Memphis	Memphis Dawn Association	Ethnic
WMDB	880 AM	Nashville	TBLC Media #2, LLC	Regional Mexican
WMFS	680 AM	Memphis	Audacy License, LLC	Sports (ESPN)
WMFS-FM	92.9 FM	Bartlett	Audacy License, LLC	Sports (ESPN)
WMLE	94.1 FM	Germantown	Educational Media Foundation	Contemporary Christian
WMGC	810 AM	Murfreesboro	Radio 810 Nashville, Limited	Spanish variety
WMJA-LP	104.1 FM	Loudon	Power of the Game Inc.	Adult contemporary
WMKW	89.3 FM	Crossville	The Moody Bible Institute of Chicago	Religious
WMLR	1230 AM	Hohenwald	Two Brothers Broadcasting	Oldies
WMOD	96.7 FM	Bolivar	WMOD, Inc.	Country
WMOT	89.5 FM	Murfreesboro	Middle Tennessee State University	Americana; roots music
WMPS	1210 AM	Bartlett	Arlington Broadcasting Company	Adult standards/Soft oldies
WMPZ	93.5 FM	Harrison	J.L. Brewer Broadcasting, LLC	Urban adult contemporary
WMQM	1600 AM	Lakeland	WMQM, Inc.	Christian
WMRB	910 AM	Columbia	Iglesia Hispana de Nashville, Inc.	Spanish Christian
WMSR	1320 AM	Manchester	Coffee County Broadcasting, Inc.	Talk
WMSR-FM	94.9 FM	Collinwood	Singing River Media Group, LLC	Country
WMTN	1300 AM	Morristown	Radio Acquisition Corp.	Classic country
WMTN-LP	93.1 FM	Sewanee	St. Andrew's-Sewanee School	Variety
WMTS-FM	88.3 FM	Murfreesboro	Middle Tennessee State University	College radio
WMTY-FM	98.3 FM	Sweetwater	Horne Radio, LLC	Oldies
WMXK	94.1 FM	Morristown	Educational Media Foundation	Contemporary Christian (K-Love)
WMXV	101.5 FM	Saint Joseph	Singing River Media Group, LLC	Hot adult contemporary
WMXX-FM	103.1 FM	Jackson	Gerald W. Hunt	Adult hits
WMYL	96.7 FM	Halls Crossroads	M & M Broadcasting	Country
WMYU-LP	99.7 FM	Ooltewah	The Freedom Fund	Christian
WNAH	1360 AM	Nashville	Hoyt M. Carter, Jr.	Religious
WNFN	106.7 FM	Franklin	Midwest Communications, Inc.	Classic country
WNFZ	94.3 FM	Powell	Midwest Communications, Inc.	Adult hits
WNKX-FM	96.7 FM	Centerville	Hickman Digital Media, Inc.	Country
WNML	990 AM	Knoxville	Radio License Holding CBC, LLC	Sports (ISN)
WNML-FM	99.1 FM	Friendsville	Radio License Holding CBC, LLC	Sports (ISN)
WNOO	1260 AM	Chattanooga	Clear Media, LLC	Urban contemporary
WNOX	93.1 FM	Karns	SM-WNOX, LLC	Classic rock
WNPC	1060 AM	Newport	Bristol Broadcasting Company, Inc.	Classic country
WNPZ	1580 AM	Knoxville	Metropolitan Management Corporation of Tennessee	Urban gospel
WNQM	1300 AM	Nashville	WNQM. Inc.	Religious
WNRQ	105.9 FM	Nashville	iHM Licenses, LLC	Classic rock
WNRX	99.3 FM	Jefferson City	Lakeway Broadcasting, LLC	Classic rock
WNRZ	91.5 FM	Dickson	Community Broadcasting, Inc.	Contemporary Christian
WNSR	560 AM	Brentwood	Southern Wabash Communications of Middle Tennessee, Inc.	Sports (ISN)
WNTC	790 AM	Ashland City	The Mighty Seven Ninety Incorporated	Country
WNVL	1240 AM	Nashville	TBLC Media, LLC	Regional Mexican
WNWS	1520 AM	Brownsville	The Wireless Group Inc.	Soft adult contemporary
WNWS-FM	101.5 FM	Jackson	The Wireless Group, Inc.	News/Talk
WNXP	91.1 FM	Nashville	Nashville Public Radio	Adult album alternative
WNZE	1400 AM	Clarksville	Saga Communications of Tuckessee, LLC	Conservative talk
WOCG	89.1 FM	Livingston	Cookeville Christian Broadcasting	Religious
WOFB-LP	97.9 FM	Greeneville	Our Father's Business, Inc.	Christian
WOFE	98.9 FM	Byrdstown	3B Properties, LLC	Classic hits
WOFM	89.1 FM	Alcoa	Educational Media Foundation	Contemporary worship (Air1)
WOGT	107.9 FM	East Ridge	Radio License Holding CBC, LLC	Country
WOGY	104.1 FM	Jackson	Forever South	Country
WOJG	94.7 FM	Bolivar	Johnny W. Shaw & Opal J. Shaw	Gospel
WOKI	98.7 FM	Oliver Springs	Radio License Holding CBC, LLC	News/Talk
WOOP-LP	99.9 FM	Cleveland	Traditional Music Resource Center, Inc.	Classic country/Bluegrass
WOPC	101.3 FM	Linden	Nunley Media Group, LLC	Country
WORM	1010 AM	Savannah	Gerald W. Hunt	Oldies
WORM-FM	101.7 FM	Savannah	Gerald W. Hunt	Country
WOWC	105.3 FM	Morrison	Peg Broadcasting, LLC	Country
WOWF	102.5 FM	Crossville	Peg Broadcasting, LLC	Country
WOWW	1430 AM	Germantown	Flinn Broadcasting Corporation	Adult album alternative
WOZO-LP	103.9 FM	Knoxville	The Neighborhood Center	Variety
WOZW-LP	103.9 FM	Knoxville	Appalachia Community Fund	Variety
WPBX	99.3 FM	Crossville	Peg Broadcasting, LLC	Adult contemporary
WPFT	106.3 FM	Pigeon Forge	East Tennessee Radio Group, L.P.	Conservative talk
WPLN-FM	90.3 FM	Nashville	Nashville Public Radio	Public, News/Talk
WPOT	1500 AM	Trenton	Grace Broadcasting Services, Inc.	Christian
WPRH	90.9 FM	Paris	American Family Association	Religious talk (AFR)
WPRT-FM	102.5 FM	Pegram	WYCQ, Inc.	Sports (ESPN)
WPTN	780 AM	Cookeville	Cookeville Communications, LLC	Classic hits
WPTP-LP	100.1 FM	Chattanooga	Alton Park Development Corporation	Urban gospel
WPWT	870 AM	Colonial Heights	Information Communications Corp.	Classic country
WQAK	105.7 FM	Union City	Thunderbolt Broadcasting Company	Active rock
WQJZ-LP	103.9 FM	Murfreesboro	Stones River Community Media Alliance	Jazz/Blues/Easy listening
WQKR	1270 AM	Portland	Venture Broadcasting LLC	Classic hits
WQLA	960 AM	La Follette	Clinton Broadcasters, Inc.	Classic rock
WQMT	93.9 FM	Hopewell	East Tennessee Radio Group III, L.P.	Country
WQMV	1060 AM	Waverly	DCDL Media, Inc.	Oldies
WQOX	88.5 FM	Memphis	Shelby County Schools	Urban adult contemporary
WQQK	92.1 FM	Goodlettsville	Cumulus Licensing LLC	Urban adult contemporary
WQTR-LP	106.1 FM	Savannah	Hardin County High School	Variety
WQUT	101.5 FM	Johnson City	Radio License Holding CBC, LLC	Classic rock
WQZQ	830 AM	Goodlettsville	WYCQ, Inc.	Sports
WRBO	103.5 FM	Germantown	Radio License Holding CBC, LLC	Urban adult contemporary
WRCC	88.3 FM	Dibrell	South Central Oklahoma Christian Broadcasting Inc.	Southern gospel
WREC	600 AM	Memphis	iHM Licenses, LLC	News/Talk
WRFN-LP	107.1 FM	Pasquo	Radio Free Nashville, Inc.	Variety
WRGS	1370 AM	Rogersville	Bouldin Radio, LLC	Classic country
WRHE-LP	98.9 FM	Dayton	W.H.A.T. Ministries	Christian
WRHW-LP	93.5 FM	Murfreesboro	Remnant Broadcasting Corporation	Christian
WRIM	89.9 FM	Cookeville	Risen Radio, Inc.	Catholic
WRJB	95.9 FM	Camden	Community Broadcasting Services, Inc	Country
WRJH-LP	105.3 FM	Greeneville	Central Baptist Church	Religious Teaching
WRJZ	620 AM	Knoxville	Tennessee Media Associates	Christian talk
WRKM	1350 AM	Carthage	Wood Broadcasting, Inc.	Sports (SM)
WRKQ	1250 AM	Madisonville	Storm Front Communications, LLC	News/Talk/Sports
WRLT	100.1 FM	Franklin	Tuned-In Broadcasting, Inc	Adult album alternative
WRQR-FM	105.5 FM	Paris	Forever South Licenses, LLC	Classic rock
WRSN	88.1 FM	Lebanon	Risen Radio, Inc.	Catholic
WRVR	104.5 FM	Memphis	Audacy License, LLC	Adult contemporary
WRVW	107.5 FM	Lebanon	iHM Licenses, LLC	Top 40 (CHR)
WRZK	95.9 FM	Colonial Heights	Holston Valley Broadcasting Corporation	Active rock
WSAA	93.1 FM	Benton	Educational Media Foundation	Contemporary worship (Air1)
WSAB-LP	92.5 FM	Jamestown	Jamestown Inspirational Media, Inc.	Christian
WSBI	1210 AM	Static	Iglesia Hispana de Nashville	Classic country
WSDC	88.5 FM	Sneedville	Duck Creek Baptist Church	Gospel
WSDQ	1190 AM	Dunlap	Spencer Travis Hickman	Country
WSEV	930 AM	Sevierville	Bristol Broadcasting Company, Inc.	Unknown
WSEV-FM	105.5 FM	Gatlinburg	East Tennessee Radio Group, L.P.	Hot adult contemporary
WSGI	1100 AM	Springfield	Eben-ezer Broadcasting Corporation	Full service
WSGM	104.7 FM	Coalmont	Cumberland Communication Corporation	Gospel
WSIX-FM	97.9 FM	Nashville	iHM Licenses, LLC	Country
WSKZ	106.5 FM	Chattanooga	Radio License Holding CBC, LLC	Classic rock
WSLV	1110 AM	Ardmore	Southern Broadcasting LLC	Country
WSM	650 AM	Nashville	WSM-AM, LLC	Country
WSM-FM	95.5 FM	Nashville	Cumulus Licensing LLC	Country
WSMC-FM	90.5 FM	Collegedale	Southern Adventist University	Classical/Public
WSMG	1450 AM	Greeneville	Radio Greeneville, Inc.	Oldies/Sports
WSMT	1050 AM	Sparta	Peg Broadcasting, LLC	Southern gospel
WSOJ-LP	102.5 FM	McMinnville	East End Church Of Christ	Bible Teaching
WSRR-LP	99.3 FM	Murfreesboro	St. Rose of Lima Catholic Church	Catholic
WTAI	88.9 FM	Union City	Educational Media Foundation	Contemporary worship (Air1)
WTBG	95.3 FM	Brownsville	Wireless Group, Inc.	News/Talk
WTCS-LP	91.9 FM	Chattanooga	Iglesia Cristo Salva	Spanish religious
WTFM	98.5 FM	Kingsport	Holston Valley Broadcasting Corporation	Adult contemporary
WTGP-LP	99.9 FM	Pikeville	The Gathering Place	Contemporary Christian
WTJF	1390 AM	Jackson	Forever South	Sports (ESPN)
WTJF-FM	94.3 FM	Dyer	Forever South Licenses, LLC	Sports (ESPN)
WTJK	105.3 FM	Humboldt	Grace Broadcasting Services, Inc.	Regional Mexican
WTJS	93.1 FM	Alamo	Grace Broadcasting Services, Inc.	Conservative talk
WTKB-FM	93.7 FM	Atwood	Solid Rock Broadcasting, LLC	Contemporary Christian
WTLT	1120 AM	Maryville	Loud Media	Urban contemporary
WTML	91.5 FM	Tullahoma	Nashville Public Radio	Public, News/Talk
WTNE-LP	94.9 FM	Cleveland	World Harvest Outreach Ministries International	Religious Teaching
WTNK	1090 AM	Hartsville	Fun Media Group of Tennessee, LLC	Classic hits
WTNV	97.3 FM	Tiptonville	Dr Pepper Pepsi-Cola Bottling Company of Dyersburg, LLC	Country
WTPR	710 AM	Paris	Forever South Licenses, LLC	Oldies
WTPR-FM	101.7 FM	McKinnon	Forever South Licenses, LLC	Oldies
WTRB	1570 AM	Ripley	WTRB, Inc.	Country
WTRO	1450 AM	Dyersburg	Dr Pepper Pepsi-Cola Bottling Company of Dyersburg, LLC	Oldies
WTRZ	107.3 FM	Spencer	Peg Broadcasting, LLC	Adult contemporary
WTSE	91.1 FM	Benton	Radio by Grace, Inc.	Contemporary Inspirational
WTTU	88.5 FM	Cookeville	Tennessee Technological University	Alternative rock
WTZX	860 AM	Sparta	Peg Broadcasting, LLC	Classic country
WUAT	1110 AM	Pikeville	WUAT, LLC	Variety
WUCH	96.9 FM	Algood	Stonecom Cookeville, LLC	Classic country
WUCP-LP	99.9 FM	Farragut	Union Cumberland Presbyterian Church	Christian
WUCT	1600 AM	Algood	Stonecom Cookeville, LLC	News/Talk
WUCZ	104.1 FM	Carthage	Wood Broadcasting, Inc.	Country
WUIE	105.1 FM	Lakesite	American Family Association	Christian
WUMC	90.5 FM	Elizabethton	Milligan College	College
WUMY	830 AM	Memphis	GMF-Christian Media I, LLC.	Christian
WUOT	91.9 FM	Knoxville	University of Tennessee	Public radio/Classical/Jazz
WUSY	100.7 FM	Cleveland	Audacy License, LLC	Country
WUTC	88.1 FM	Chattanooga	University of Tennessee	Public radio
WUTK-FM	90.3 FM	Knoxville	University of Tennessee	Rock
WUTM	90.3 FM	Martin	The University of Tennessee	Top 40 (CHR)
WUUQ	97.3 FM	South Pittsburg	Jackson Telecasters, Inc.	Classic country
WVCP	88.5 FM	Gallatin	Volunteer State Community College	College
WVFB	101.5 FM	Celina	Frank Keeton Aircasters, Inc.	Country
WVLZ	850 AM	Maryville	Loud Media LLC	Active rock
WVMG-LP	101.1 FM	Chattanooga	Destiny Life Resources, Inc.	Religious Teaching
WVOL	1470 AM	Berry Hill	Heidelberg Broadcasting, LLC	Urban oldies
WVVB	1410 AM	Kingston	3B Tennessee, Inc.	Top 40 (CHR)
WVZM-LP	100.3 FM	Memphis	Visible Music College	Country
WWDX	1530 AM	Huntingdon	Freeland Broadcasting Co, Inc.	Sports (SM)
WWGM	93.9 FM	Selmer	Southern Broadcasting LLC	Country
WWLX	590 AM	Loretto	Prospect Communications	Adult hits
WWOG	90.9 FM	Cookeville	Somerset Educational Broadcasting Foundation	Religious
WWON	930 AM	Waynesboro	Jukebox Media LLC	Country
WWON-FM	100.7 FM	Waynesboro	Jukebox Media LLC	Oldies
WWQK	88.7 FM	Oak Ridge	The Power Foundation	Southern gospel
WWQS	88.5 FM	Decatur	The Power Foundation	Southern gospel
WWQW	90.3 FM	Wartburg	The Power Foundation	Southern gospel
WWST	102.1 FM	Sevierville	SM-WWST, LLC	Top 40 (CHR)
WWTN	99.7 FM	Hendersonville	Cumulus Licensing LLC	News/Talk
WWYN	106.9 FM	McKenzie	Rainbow Media, Inc., debtor-in-possession	Country
WXCT	1370 AM	Chattanooga	Jackson Telecasters, Inc.	Adult album alternative
WXIS	103.9 FM	Erwin	WEMB, Incorporated	All news
WXKV	90.5 FM	Selmer	Educational Media Foundation	Contemporary Christian
WXMP-LP	106.5 FM	Cordova	Millington Community Center, Inc.	Spanish religious
WXMX	98.1 FM	Millington	Radio License Holding CBC, LLC	Mainstream rock
WXNA-LP	101.5 FM	Nashville	WRVU Friends and Family	Variety
WXNS-LP	106.3 FM	Nashville	North Nashville Community Radio	Community radio
WXOL-LP	106.3 FM	Dresden	Dresden Church of Christ	Religious Teaching
WXRH	580 AM	Rockwood	3B Tennessee, Inc.	Classic country
WXRQ	1460 AM	Mount Pleasant	Greg Combs d/b/a Providential Broadcasting	Southern gospel
WXSM	640 AM	Blountville	Radio License Holding CBC, LLC	Sports
WYBK	89.7 FM	Chattanooga	Bible Broadcasting Network, Inc.	Conservative Christian
WYCZ	1030 AM	White Bluff	Young Country Holdings, LLC	Country/hip hop
WYDL	100.3 FM	Middleton	Southern Broadcasting LLC	Top 40 (CHR)
WYFC	95.3 FM	Clinton	Bible Broadcasting Network, Inc.	Conservative Christian
WYFN	980 AM	Nashville	Bible Broadcasting Network, Inc.	Conservative Christian
WYGI	1430 AM	Madison	Kensington Digital Media, L.L.C.	Classic hits
WYGO	99.5 FM	Madisonville	Major Broadcasting Corporation	Hot adult contemporary
WYJJ	97.7 FM	Trenton	Forever South Licenses, LLC	Urban adult contemporary
WYJV	710 AM	Smyrna	Iglesia Misionera Jesucristo Viene Pronto Inc.	Religious
WYLV	89.1 FM	Maynardville	Educational Media Foundation	Contemporary Christian
WYPL	89.3 FM	Memphis	Memphis Public Library & Info Center	Radio Reading Service
WYSH	1380 AM	Clinton	Clinton Broadcasters, Inc.	Classic country
WYTM-FM	105.5 FM	Fayetteville	Elk River Media LLC	Country
WYXE	1130 AM	Gallatin	Iglesia Hispana de Nashville, Inc.	Spanish Christian
WYXI	1390 AM	Athens	Mark and Mary Lefler	Oldies/Talk/Personality
WYXR	91.7 FM	Memphis	Crosstown Radio Partnership, Inc.	Freeform
WZDQ	102.3 FM	Humboldt	Thomas Radio, LLC, debtor-in-possession	Active rock
WZKV	90.7 FM	Dyersburg	Educational Media Foundation	Contemporary Christian (K-Love)
WZLT	99.3 FM	Lexington	Lexington Broadcasting Services, Inc	Country
WZNG	1400 AM	Shelbyville	Hopkins Farms Broadcasting Inc.	Classic rock
WZNO-LP	107.3 FM	Cleveland	Foundation House Ministries	Religious Teaching
WZTH	91.1 FM	Tusculum	Solid Foundation Broadcasting Corporation	Christian
WZTN	89.9 FM	Cornersville	Road Map Ministries	Contemporary Christian
WZXX	88.5 FM	Lawrenceburg	Radio by Grace, Inc.	Contemporary Inspirational
WZYX	1440 AM	Cowan	Wiseman Media	Adult hits
WZYZ	90.1 FM	Spencer	Church Faith Trinity Assemblies	Christian

== Defunct ==
- W4XA
- WCLC
- WEMG, Knoxville
- WFWL
- WGOC
- WHER, Memphis
- WKN
- WLYY
- WMRO
- WNTT
- WOCV
- WPO
- WSM-FM (1941–1951)
- WTAZ-LP
- WTNW
- WUTS
- WUTZ
- WXOQ

== See also ==
- Tennessee media
  - List of newspapers in Tennessee
  - List of television stations in Tennessee
  - Media of cities in Tennessee: Chattanooga, Knoxville, Memphis, Murfreesboro, Nashville

== Bibliography ==
- Jack Alicoate, ed. (1939), "Tennessee", Radio Annual, New York: Radio Daily, OCLC 2459636 – via Internet Archive
- "AM Stations in the U.S.: Tennessee", Radio Annual Television Year Book, New York: Radio Television Daily, 1963, OCLC 10512375 – via Internet Archive
- John H. Dewitt Jr. (1972). "Early Radio Broadcasting in Middle Tennessee". Tennessee Historical Quarterly. 31 (1): 80–94. JSTOR 42623284.
- William R. Barrick; Gilbert L. Fowler (1983). "Extent of Commercialization of Memphis Radio Stations". Journalism Quarterly. 60 (3): 538–542. doi:10.1177/107769908306000328. S2CID 144376132.
- George T. Wilson (1993). "When Memphis Made Radio History". American Visions. 8. African American Museums Association. ISSN 0884-9390. (About WDIA)

== Images ==
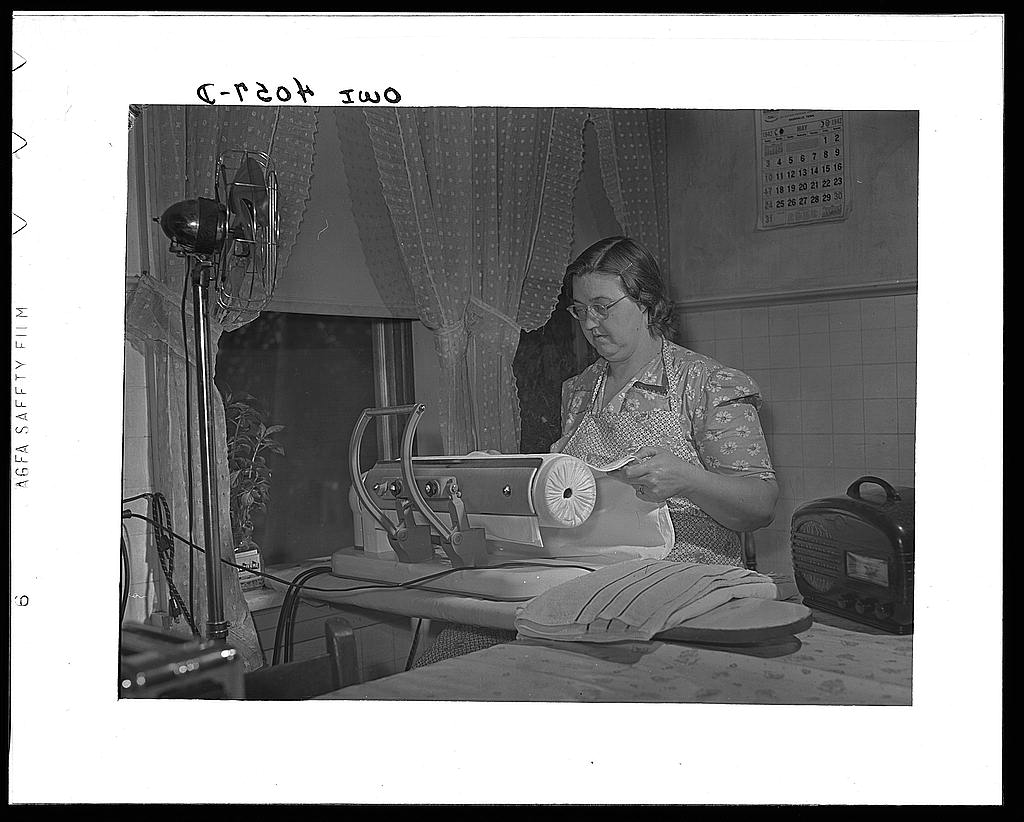
Woman with radio (far right), Knox County, Tennessee, 1942

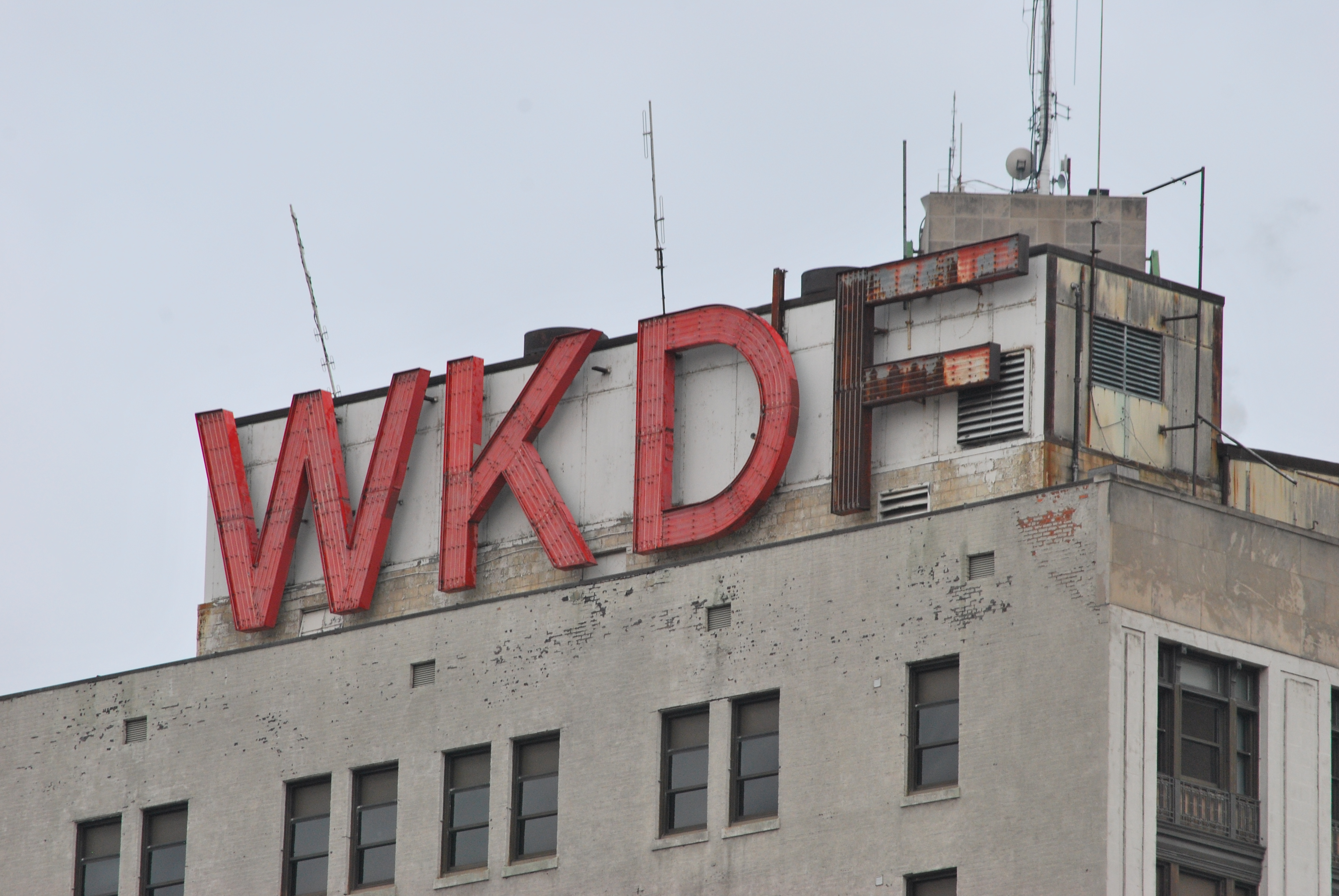
WKDF, Nashville, 2009

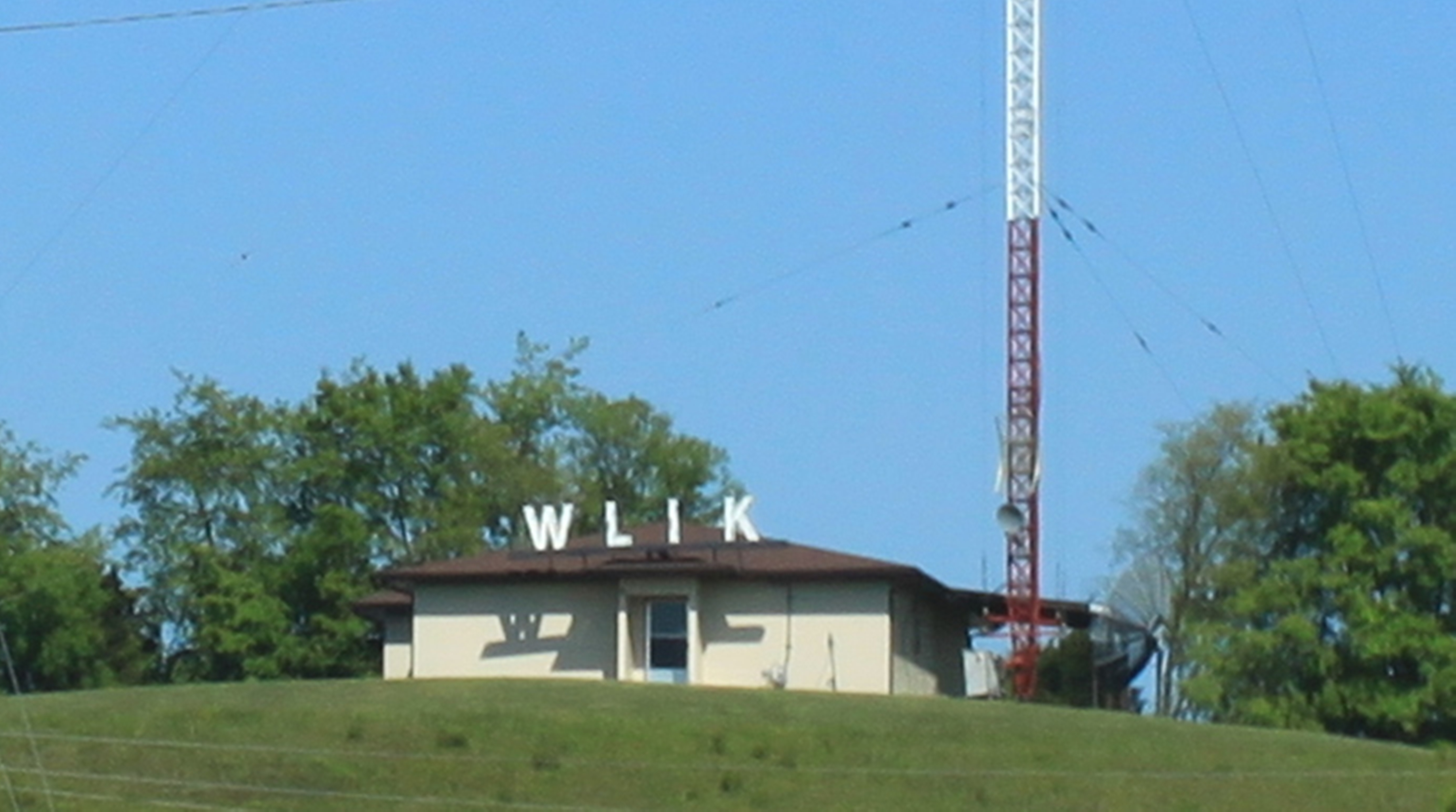
WLIK, Newport, Tennessee, 2012
