= WLNT-LP =

- Loudon, Tennessee; United States
- Frequency: 96.1 MHz
- Branding: 96.1/107.1 WLNT

Programming
- Format: Country music

Ownership
- Owner: Community Radio of Loudon County, Inc.

History
- First air date: August 2002

Technical information
- Licensing authority: FCC
- Facility ID: 133392
- ERP: 25 watts
- HAAT: 60 m (200 ft)
- Transmitter coordinates: 35°44′11″N 84°21′21″W
- Repeater: 107.1 WLNU-LP (Lenoir City) (Note: Owned by the J. W. McGhee Foundation for Broadcast Arts)

Links
- Public license information: LMS
- Website: wlntfm.com redskinradio.com

WLNT-LP (96.1 FM) is a radio station broadcasting from Loudon, Tennessee. It airs a format of modern and traditional country music. Licensed to Community Radio of Loudon County Inc., it serves Loudon County, Tennessee (including the cities of Loudon, Philadelphia and Lenoir City). The station is also audible in Roane, Monroe, Knox and Blount Counties. The station first began broadcasting in August 2002 and was originally owned by the Corporation For Radio Education, Inc.

== History ==
WLNT was founded by Richard "Chip" Lynn, a lifelong resident of Loudon County. Lynn began his radio career at WLOD (AM) 1140 kHz in Loudon in the spring of 1985. From 1987 to 1995, he worked for the father-son team of James C. and Randall W. Sliger (and family) in Athens, Tennessee. Primarily on-air at WJSQ and WLAR, Lynn also helped with the construction of Sliger-owned station WYGO (99.5 FM), the purchase and reformatting of WCLE (AM) 1570 in Cleveland and the construction of its Calhoun, Tennessee counterpart WCLE-FM 104.1.

From 1995 to 2003, Lynn worked in management at the network-operations department for Scripps-Howard Broadcasting at its Knoxville-based Home & Garden Television Network. He assisted the network when its programming temporarily originated from Atlanta, also creating backup facilities in Nashville. Lynn also assisted in moving and integrating the Food Network from New York to Knoxville, and with construction of the DIY and Fine Living Networks.

While WLNT was operating, Lynn became frustrated with the corporate world; he left Scripps in July 2003 to pursue a career in local radio, devoting nearly 20 hours per day to the station. Lynn was aided in WLNT's construction, operation and upgrades by Jim McGhee, another Loudon County resident who had recently retired as engineer and program director at WBIR-TV (channel 10) in Knoxville. McGhee retired from WLNT and the broadcast industry in 2005. The call letters WLNT had previously been used by WLOD (1140 AM) in Loudon, which had signed on 1982 used the call letters WLNT until it was sold in 1985 by original owners Jim McGhee and Howard Oberholtzer. As of 2011, in retirement McGhee continued to support WLNT's projects. McGhee split his time between Tennessee and Florida until his death in April 2013. The J. W. McGhee Foundation for Broadcast Arts owns WLNU-LP (107.1 FM), which broadcasts some programming from WLNT, in addition to its own offerings.

In fall 2003, WLNT began broadcasting Loudon Redskins football games with Kent Everett, Eric Mitchell and David "Top" Dukes. That year, two other stations (WDEH and WLIL) also carried Redskins games. In 2004, WLNT continued broadcasting Redskins football; WLIL no longer covered the games, since its sportscaster Russell Mayes left for a career in education. Mayes is (as of 2011) media instructor at Fulton High School in Knoxville, and operates WKCS FM (91.1) for the Knox County Schools. In 2005, WLNT was the only station to broadcast the Redskins and began using the slogan "There's only one place to hear the Redskins". The station also began covering Loudon Redskins basketball and baseball in 2003. Currently Mike Thompson & Scott Hope handle sportscasting duties for both LHS Football and Baseball.

WLNT has had the same call letters and format since its inception in August 2002, first broadcasting from a transmitter on Prospect Church Road. In December 2002, the station petitioned the Federal Communications Commission to relocate its transmitter about 3,500 feet (1,100 m) east-northeast to a site on Matlock Ridge in Loudon. This move increased WLNT's coverage, since the Matlock Ridge site is line-of-sight to a large part of the area's population.

In July 2008 a microburst struck WLNT's transmitter site, destroying the transmitter building and all equipment inside except for the transmitter, FM antenna and studio-transmitter-link. The station temporarily operated from a portable building until a new structure could be built. Because WLNT had a redundant equipment on hand the downtime was less than 12 hours. Don Burrgraff, former transmitter and studio engineer at WBIR-TV (channel 10) in Knoxville, helps WLNT with transmitter and RF issues. Burgraff is also Technical Director and board member for the Cumberland Communities Communications Corporation and its non-commercial station WDVX in Clinton and is a contract engineer for several radio stations and translators in eastern Tennessee. The station later moved its antenna to a leased space.

== Programming ==
WLNT's web presence is one of several stations hosted at REDSKINRADIO.com. Syndicated programming on the station includes The John and Heidi Show weekday mornings, The Country Oldies Show with Steve Warren, WLNT broadcasts sports from Loudon High School including football, basketball and baseball. Mike Thompson & Scott Hope broadcast football & baseball. Wiley Brakebill & Chip Lynn produce basketball programming for the station. WLNT broadcasts national newscasts from ABC Audio. Religious programs from local churches are broadcast Sundays. Middays and afternoons are hosted by Terry Dean and Chris Russell respectively from Salamanca, New York and the studios of WGWE.

In May 2010, at Loudon High School's graduation ceremony, Chip Lynn was awarded the 2009-2010 Alumnus of the Year Award for his continuing support of Loudon High School and the Redskins.

In March 2013 WLNT moved out of its downtown Loudon studio after purchasing a location with more space.

In November 2017, Randy Davis, former broadcast partner of Dewayne Arp on early Redskin Basketball broadcasts died.

Mike Stephens provides morning and afternoon local newscasts on the station.

On January 11, 2021 Ronnie Roberts, who had served as announcer for Loudon Basketball & Baseball in previous years and had served as guest announcer for many years, died after complications from heart surgery. WLNT & RedskinRadio.com broadcast the memorial services live.
