= WOFE =

WOFE or WofE may refer to:

- WOFE (FM), a radio station (98.9 FM) licensed to serve Byrdstown, Tennessee, United States
- WXRH, a radio station (580 AM) licensed to serve Rockwood, Tennessee, which held the call sign WOFE until 2008
- WIHG, a radio station (105.7 FM) licensed to serve Rockwood, Tennessee, which held the call sign WOFE-FM from 1990 to 2003

See also:

- Wholly Foreign-Owned Enterprise (WFOE)
