= WCLC =

WCLC may refer to:

- WCLC-FM, a radio station (105.1 FM) licensed to serve Jamestown, Tennessee, United States
- WCLC (AM), a defunct radio station (1260 AM) formerly licensed to serve Jamestown, Tennessee
- Western Canada Lottery Corporation, operates lottery and gaming-related activities in the prairie provinces and territories of Canada
