= WMTN =

WMTN may refer to:

- WMTN (AM), a radio station (1300 AM) licensed to Morristown, Tennessee, United States
- WMTN-LP, a low-power radio station (93.1 FM) licensed to Sewanee, Tennessee, United States
