= WPTP =

WPTP may refer to:

- WPTP-LP, a low-power radio station (100.1 FM) licensed to serve Chattanooga, Tennessee, United States
- WPTP-LP (defunct), a defunct low-power radio station (104.3 FM) formerly licensed to serve Marble, North Carolina, United States
- WTDY-FM, a full-power radio station (96.5 FM) that formerly held the WPTP call letters from 2000 to 2003, licensed to serve Philadelphia, Pennsylvania, United States
