= WKZX =

WKZX may refer to:

- WKZX (Maine), a radio station broadcasting on 950 AM in Presque Isle, Maine
- WKZX-FM, a radio station broadcasting a Regional Mexican format licensed to Lenoir City, Tennessee
- WNPX-TV or WKZX, an Ion Television-owned-and-operated station serving Nashville, Tennessee
