= WLYY =

WLYY may refer to:

- WLYY (FM), a radio station (90.7 FM) licensed to serve Louisville, Mississippi, United States
- WLYY (AM), a defunct radio station (1400 AM) formerly licensed to serve Copperhill, Tennessee, United States
