= WYHM =

WYHM may refer to:

- WXRH, a radio station (580 AM) licensed to serve Rockwood, Tennessee, United States, which held the call sign WYHM from 2008 to 2020
- WSAN, a radio station (1470 AM) licensed to serve Allentown, Pennsylvania, United States, which held the call sign WYHM from 2006 to 2007
