= WLSB =

WLSB may refer to:

- WLSB (FM), a radio station (98.5 FM) licensed to serve Augusta, Illinois, United States
- WLYY (AM), a defunct radio station (1400 AM) formerly licensed to serve Copperhill, Tennessee, United States, which held the call sign WLSB until 2013
