= WTAZ =

WTAZ may refer to:

- WTAZ (AM), a radio station (1580 AM) licensed to serve Oxford, Alabama, United States
- WTAZ-LP, a defunct radio station (98.3 FM) formerly licensed to serve New Tazewell, Tennessee, United States
