= WENR =

WENR refers to the following broadcasting stations in the United States:

- WENR (AM), a radio station (1090 AM) licensed to Englewood, Tennessee, United States
- WENR (Chicago), a radio station (890 AM) licensed to Chicago, Illinois, United States, merged into WLS (AM) in 1954
- WLS-FM, a radio station (94.7 FM) licensed to Chicago, Illinois, United States, which held the call sign WENR-FM until 1965
- WLS-TV, a television station (channel 7) licensed to Chicago, Illinois, United States, which held the call sign WENR-TV from 1948 to 1953
