= WMJB =

WMJB may refer to:

- WMJB (FM), a radio station (95.3 FM) licensed to serve Valley, Alabama, United States
- WLNU-LP, a low-power radio station (107.1 FM) licensed to serve Lenoir City, Tennessee, United States, which held the call sign WMJB-LP from 2014 to 2016
- WUAF-LP, a low-power radio station (107.9 FM) licensed to serve Lake City, Florida, United States, which held the call sign WMJB-LP from 2004 to 2012
