= WOCV =

WOCV may refer to:

- WOCV-CD, a television station (channel 27, virtual 35) licensed to Cleveland, Ohio, United States
- WOCV (AM), a defunct radio station (1310 AM) formerly licensed to Oneida, Tennessee, United States, known as WOCV from 1988 to 2020
