= WLOD =

WLOD may refer to:

- WLOD (AM), a radio station (1140 AM) licensed to serve Loudon, Tennessee, United States
- WMTY-FM, a radio station (98.3 FM) licensed to serve Sweetwater, Tennessee, which held the call sign WLOD-FM from 2001 to 2010
- WNML-FM, a radio station (99.1 FM) licensed to serve Friendsville, Tennessee, which held the call sign WLOD-FM from 1988 to 1991
