= WZNO =

WZNO may refer to:

- WZNO-LP, a low-power radio station (107.3 FM) licensed to serve Cleveland, Tennessee, United States
- WRKS, a radio station (105.9 FM) licensed to serve Pickens, Mississippi, United States, which held the call sign WZNO from 2009 to 2012
