= WFWL =

Camden, Tennessee; United States
- Frequency: 1220 kHz
- Branding: The Catfish

Programming
- Format: Defunct (was Country)
- Affiliations: Citadel Media

Ownership
- Owner: Community Broadcasting Services, Inc.

History
- First air date: 1956

Technical information
- Facility ID: 4801
- Class: D
- Power: 250 watts day 140 watts night
- Transmitter coordinates: 36°3′10.00″N 88°5′15.00″W

WFWL (1220 AM, "The Catfish") was a radio station broadcasting a country music format. Licensed to Camden, Tennessee, United States, the station was owned by Community Broadcasting Services, Inc. and featured programming from Citadel Media.

In November 2021, the station announced that it would cease operations on December 1, 2021, after 65 years on the air.

On June 3, 2022, Community Broadcasting Services surrendered WFWL's license to the Federal Communications Commission and the license was cancelled. Due to that, W259BN started simulcasting WRJB.
