= WEKR =

- Fayetteville, Tennessee; United States
- Frequency: 1240 kHz
- Branding: 98-5 The Elk

Programming
- Format: Classic rock

Ownership
- Owner: John Malone; (Elk River Media LLC)
- Sister stations: WYTM-FM

History
- First air date: October 1, 1948
- Call sign meaning: W ElK River

Technical information
- Licensing authority: FCC
- Facility ID: 32199
- Class: C
- Power: 1,000 watts unlimited
- Transmitter coordinates: 35°9′28.00″N 86°35′25.00″W
- Translator: (98.5 MHz) W253CX (Fayetteville)

Links
- Public license information: Public file; LMS
- Website: www.985theelk.com

WEKR (1240 AM, 98.5 The Elk) is a radio station broadcasting classic rock format. Licensed to Fayetteville, Tennessee, United States, the station is owned by John Malone, through licensee Elk River Media LLC.

== History ==
WEKR signed on the air on October 1, 1948. Paul Crowder was an early owner. He later sold the station to his son-in-law James Porter Clark, who maintained ownership until selling to former staff member Mike Freeland in 1982. Freeland owned the station for several years before selling WEKR to local educator Claude Hopkins. Hopkins Broadcasting sold to Elk River Broadcasting (Joe Young) a few years later. Mr. Young died in 2020. Elk River Broadcasting entered into a time brokerage agreement with Elk River Media LLC on September 1, 2021 with a subsequent sale on May 2, 2022. Elk River Media LLC is owned by Fayetteville, Tennessee native and longtime broadcaster John Malone.

Notable WEKR personalities included Ernest Tucker, Teddy Barnes, Joe Young, Bob Reich, Mike Freeland, Ed Chapman, Doug Roach, Fred Eady, Carl Chapman, Tom Waynick, John Malone, George McKay, Lee Maddox, Don Counts, Troy Malone, Scott Hopkins, Eddie Tucker, Jerry Raby and Steve Edging.

== Sports programming ==
WEKR broadcasts Fayetteville High School Football and Basketball games. The station became an affiliate of the Alabama Crimson Tide Radio Network in the fall of 2021 and carries University of Alabama Football and Basketball games and related programming. In past years, WEKR was the flagship station for Fayetteville Central High School sports and, upon consolidation of the four county high schools in 1979, Lincoln County High School sports. WEKR was also a longtime affiliate of the Vanderbilt Commodores radio network.

== Weather programming ==
WEKR was a weather bureau certified observation station for many years. Presently it is affiliated with Huntsville, Alabama television station WHNT which provides Lincoln County forecasts and severe weather coverage on WEKR.
