= WXOQ =

- Selmer, Tennessee; United States
- Frequency: 105.5 MHz
- Branding: The Worm Q105

Programming
- Format: Country
- Affiliations: Real Country (Westwood One)

Ownership
- Owner: Gerald W. Hunt

History
- First air date: 1986
- Last air date: 2022

Technical information
- Licensing authority: FCC
- Facility ID: 52325
- Class: A
- ERP: 6,000 watts
- HAAT: 91.0 meters (298.6 ft)
- Transmitter coordinates: 35°13′11″N 88°40′23″W

Links
- Public license information: Public file; LMS

WXOQ (105.5 FM) was a radio station broadcasting a country music format. Licensed to Selmer, Tennessee, United States, the station was last owned by Gerald W. Hunt, carrying programming from Westwood One's Real Country network.

WXOQ's license was surrendered to the Federal Communications Commission and cancelled on April 15, 2022.
