= WYXI =

Radio station of Tennessee

- Athens, Tennessee; United States
- Frequency: 1390 kHz
- Branding: Wixie Radio

Programming
- Format: Oldies/Talk/Personality
- Affiliations: Citadel Media, Premiere Radio Networks

Ownership
- Owner: Mark and Mary Lefler

History
- First air date: October 5, 1966

Technical information
- Licensing authority: FCC
- Facility ID: 13931
- Class: D
- Power: 2,500 watts day 62 watts night
- Transmitter coordinates: 35°26′48.00″N 84°34′19.00″W
- Translator: 94.5 W233CI (Athens)

Links
- Public license information: Public file; LMS
- Website: wyxi.com

WYXI (1390 AM, "Wixie Radio") is a radio station broadcasting a combination oldies/talk/personality format. Licensed to Athens, Tennessee, United States, the station is currently owned by Mark and Mary Lefler, and features programming from Citadel Media and Premiere Radio Networks.
