= WKCS =

- Knoxville, Tennessee; United States
- Frequency: 91.1 MHz
- Branding: Falcon Radio

Programming
- Format: Oldies; classic hits

Ownership
- Owner: Fulton High School

History
- First air date: December 18, 1952
- Call sign meaning: Knox County Schools

Technical information
- Licensing authority: FCC
- Facility ID: 22901
- Class: A
- ERP: 310 watts
- HAAT: 22 meters (72 ft)
- Transmitter coordinates: 35°59′36″N 83°55′24″W

Links
- Public license information: Public file; LMS
- Webcast: Listen live
- Website: www.wkcsradio.org

WKCS (91.1 FM, "Falcon Radio") is a student-operated high school radio station in Knoxville, Tennessee, broadcasting an oldies and classic hits radio format.

The station is currently owned and operated by Fulton High School, and was included in the school's charter in 1951. The "KCS" component of its call letters refers to "Knox County Schools", and the station's nickname of "Falcon Radio" is a reference to the public high school's mascot. In addition to music, the station features live broadcasts of the school's football and basketball games.

WKCS is the only East Tennessee student station to operate around the clock.

== History ==
WKCS started operating on December 18, 1952, during Fulton High School's second school year. Although it was licensed to broadcast at 310 watts, for many years its power was limited to 250 watts due to the capacity of its transmitter. In 1996 the school acquired a new 1100-watt stereo transmitter and was able to increase its power. Full 24-hour operation began in February 2005, after a digital automation system was installed. In 2007, the station added an online service.

In the early years, the station primarily broadcast sports and spoken-word programming, including new (live and pre-recorded), drama, and variety programming, with music aired at lunchtime. Music programming increased over time, and a "good music" format was introduced in the 1960s, including Top 40, adult standards, and country music. That was replaced by a rock music format in the early 1970s, and later by an adult contemporary format. The current oldies format has been in place since 1995.

== Awards ==
In 2010, "Thrillin' Thursdays", a two-hour-long sports talk program aired weekly on WKCS, was named the best sports talk program in the Columbia College Chicago High School Radio Awards. The station's "Fulton Football Pregame Show" is a finalist in the sports talk program category in the John Drury High School Radio Awards, to be announced in November 2010.

== See also ==
- List of radio stations in Tennessee
- List of high school radio stations in the United States
