= WRKM =

- Carthage, Tennessee; United States
- Frequency: 1350 kHz
- Branding: AM 1350 SportsMap Radio

Programming
- Format: Sports
- Affiliations: SportsMap

Ownership
- Owner: Wood Broadcasting, Inc.
- Sister stations: WUCZ

History
- First air date: July 1959; 66 years ago

Technical information
- Licensing authority: FCC
- Facility ID: 73598
- Class: D
- Power: 1,000 watts day 90 watts night
- Transmitter coordinates: 36°14′42.00″N 85°56′44.00″W

Links
- Public license information: Public file; LMS
- Webcast: Listen live
- Website: 1041theranch.com

WRKM (1350 AM, "AM 1350 SportsMap Radio") is a radio station broadcasting a Sports format. Licensed to Carthage, Tennessee, United States, the station is currently owned by Wood Broadcasting, Inc. and features programming from SportsMap.
