= WMTN-LP =

Radio station in Sewanee, Tennessee

- Sewanee, Tennessee; United States
- Frequency: 93.1 MHz
- Branding: "FM 103.1 The Mountain"

Programming
- Format: Variety

Ownership
- Owner: St. Andrew's-Sewanee School

History
- Former frequencies: 94.1 MHz (2005–2011)

Technical information
- Licensing authority: FCC
- Facility ID: 135206
- Class: L1
- ERP: 2 watts
- HAAT: 205.0 meters (672.6 ft)
- Transmitter coordinates: 35°13′11.00″N 85°53′51.00″W
- Translator: 103.1 FM W276CJ (Sewanee)

Links
- Public license information: LMS
- Website: sasradio.org

WMTN-LP (93.1 FM, "The Mountain") is a radio station broadcasting a variety music format. Licensed to Sewanee, Tennessee, United States, the station is currently owned by St. Andrew's-Sewanee School. WMTN's Programming is also relayed on 103.1 FM W276CJ.

== See also ==
- List of radio stations in Tennessee
- List of high school radio stations in the United States
