= WKRM =

- Columbia, Tennessee; United States
- Frequency: 1340 kHz
- Branding: Mule Town Radio 103.7 WKRM

Programming
- Format: Variety hits
- Affiliations: Citadel Media, Motor Racing Network, Premiere Radio Networks

Ownership
- Owner: Middle Tennessee Broadcasting Co., Inc. (Sale pending to Kennedy Broadcasting)
- Sister stations: WKOM

History
- First air date: November 25, 1946

Technical information
- Licensing authority: FCC
- Facility ID: 41995
- Class: C
- Power: 1,000 watts unlimited
- Transmitter coordinates: 35°36′38.00″N 87°3′22.00″W
- Translator: 103.7 W279DL (Columbia)

Links
- Public license information: Public file; LMS
- Webcast: Listen Live
- Website: wkrmradio.com

WKRM (1340 AM, "Today's Hits 1340") is a radio station broadcasting a variety hits music format. Licensed to Columbia, Tennessee, United States, the station is currently owned by Middle Tennessee Broadcasting Co., Inc. and features programming from Citadel Media, Motor Racing Network, and Premiere Radio Networks.
