= W4XA =

Experimental radio broadcasting station in Nashville, Tennessee (1939–1940)

W4XA was an "experimental audio broadcasting station" operated by The National Life and Accident Insurance Company in Nashville, Tennessee, from 1939 to 1940. It was part of a group of stations informally referred to as "Apex" stations, because it transmitted programming intended for the general public over what was then known as "ultra-high short-wave" frequencies. Although co-owned with AM station WSM, it primarily originated its own programs. W4XA ceased broadcasting in 1940, as station management prepared to inaugurate a new FM station, W47NV.

== History ==
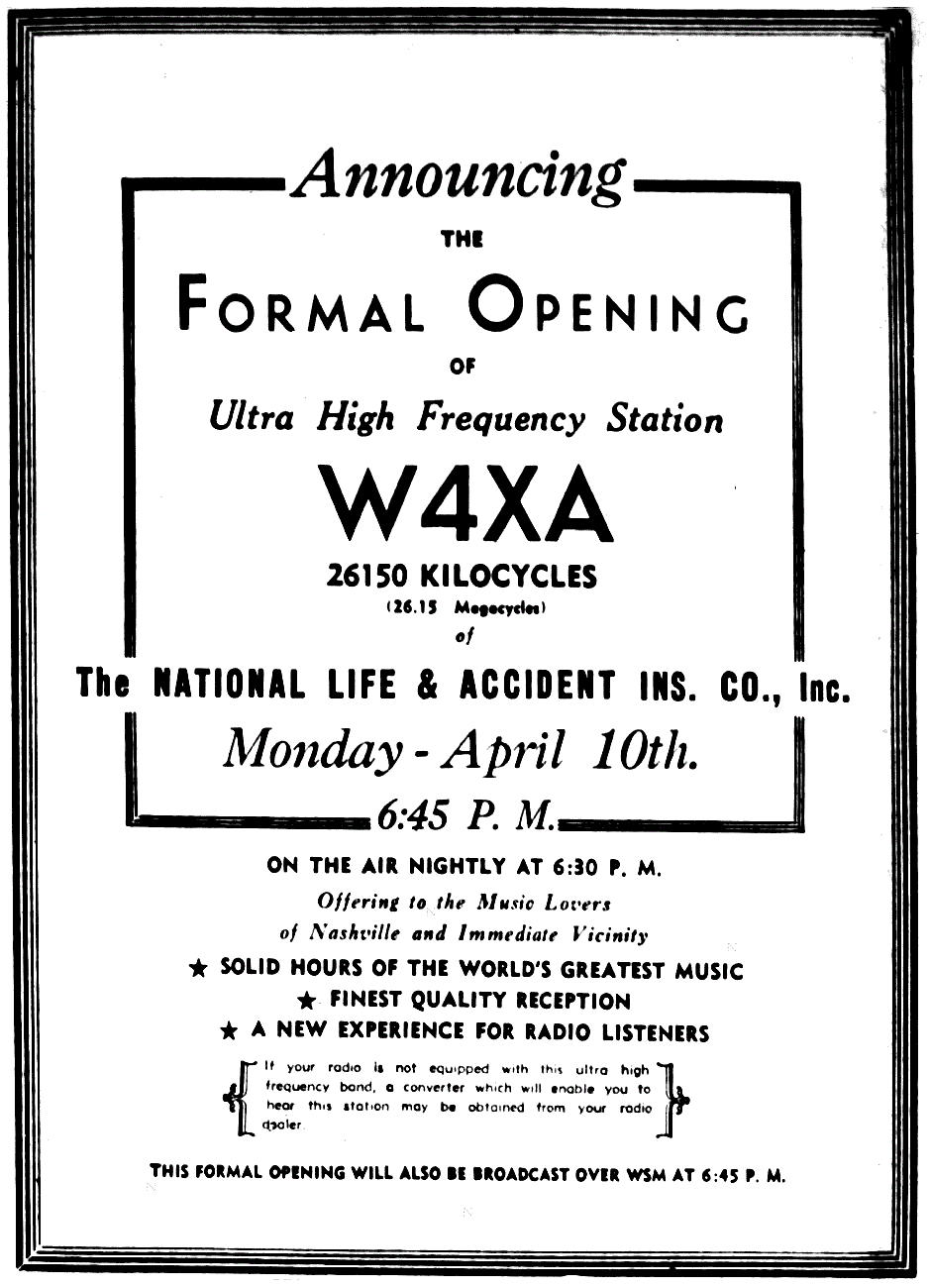
W4XA made its formal debut broadcast on April 10, 1939.

In the early 1930s, technical advances made it possible to transmit using much higher frequencies than before. It soon became apparent that there were significant differences in the propagation characteristics of various frequency ranges. Signals from shortwave stations, operating roughly in the range from 5 MHz to 20 MHz, were found to be readily reflected by the ionosphere during both the day and at night, resulting in stations that sometimes could transmit halfway around the world.

In addition, initial investigations suggested that distant signal propagation by both groundwave and skywave generally became minimal above around 20 MHz, which meant that station coverage was limited to just line-of-sight distances from the transmitting antenna. This was considered to be a valuable characteristic by the Federal Communications Commission (FCC), because it would allow the establishment of broadcasting stations with limited but consistent day and night coverage, that could only be received by their local communities. It also meant that multiple stations could operate on the same frequency throughout the country without interfering with each other. Due to the line-of-sight limitation, there was a premium on placing antennas at high elevations, which led to these stations as a group becoming informally known as "Apex" stations. A number of organizations independently applied for experimental licenses in order to investigate the potential of was then known as "ultra-high short-wave" transmissions. The FCC began issuing licenses to parties interested in testing the suitability of higher frequencies, commonly for transmissions using had wider bandwidths compared to standard AM band stations, and thus capable of higher fidelity transmissions.

By the late 1930s The National Life and Accident Insurance Company already had extensive broadcasting experience, beginning with an AM station, WSM, which it founded in 1925, and the station's staff was interested in developing an additional broadcast service on the new frequencies. National Life was issued a construction permit, with the call sign W4XA, (Note: The "4" in W4XA's call sign indicated that it was located in the 4th radio district, while the "X" reflected its operation as an experimental station.) for an experimental broadcasting station in late 1938, with construction under the oversight of WSM's chief engineer John DeWitt, Jr. W4XA made its formal debut on the evening of April 10, 1939, transmitting on 26.15 MHz. In order to place the transmitting antenna as high as possible, W4XA's was installed atop WSM's existing tower, which at the time was one of the tallest in the United States.

Although most Apex stations primarily simulcast the programs of an affiliated AM station, W4XA's programming was normally independent from WSM's. At its start the station advertised that it was "Offering to the Music Lovers of Nashville and Immediate Vicinity: Solid Hours of the World's Greatest Music, Finest Quality Reception, A New Experience For Radio Listeners". In contrast to the showcase Grand Ole Opry program on WSM, W4XA's programming was "purely classical except for two news periods daily". Initially W4XA's schedule was 35 hours per week, from 11:00 a.m. to 1:00 p.m. and 6:30 to 10:00 p.m. Monday through Saturday, plus children's programs from 4:00 to 4:30 p.m. on Monday, Wednesday and Friday. A major limitation on the potential audience was that most radio receivers of this era could not be tuned to the high frequency used by W4XA, although a convertor could be installed in existing receivers, and in July 1939 Gambill's Moto-Home advertised "a small radio convertor to pick up W4XA" for $12.95. Because it was operating under an experimental license, W4XA was prohibited from selling advertising time, although it was allowed to simulcast commercial programs broadcast by WSM.

W4XA was described at its introduction as being an "experiment with the efficiency of shortwaves for local broadcasting". However, it was soon realized that, contrary to initial expectations, at times stations operating on frequencies in the 25 MHz range actually did produce strong skywave signals, due to a strengthening of the ionosphere during periods of high solar activity, which most commonly occurred in the summer months during mid-day hours, and also during peaks in the 11-year sunspot cycle. Thus, at times W4XA was unintentionally being heard as far away as in Australia. This determination led to the FCC moving the developing broadcasting service stations, which by now began to include experimental FM radio and TV stations, to higher frequencies that were less affected by solar influences.

Although W4XA, provided superior sound quality as a high-fidelity AM station, it was eventually determined that a then-new technology, "frequency modulation" (FM) transmission, was even better, especially in eliminating static interference. In March 1940 it was reported that WSM staff were interested in establishing an FM station. W4XA ended operations sometime in 1940, in order to make way for a commercial FM station, W47NV, which debuted in March 1941.
