= WYTM-FM =

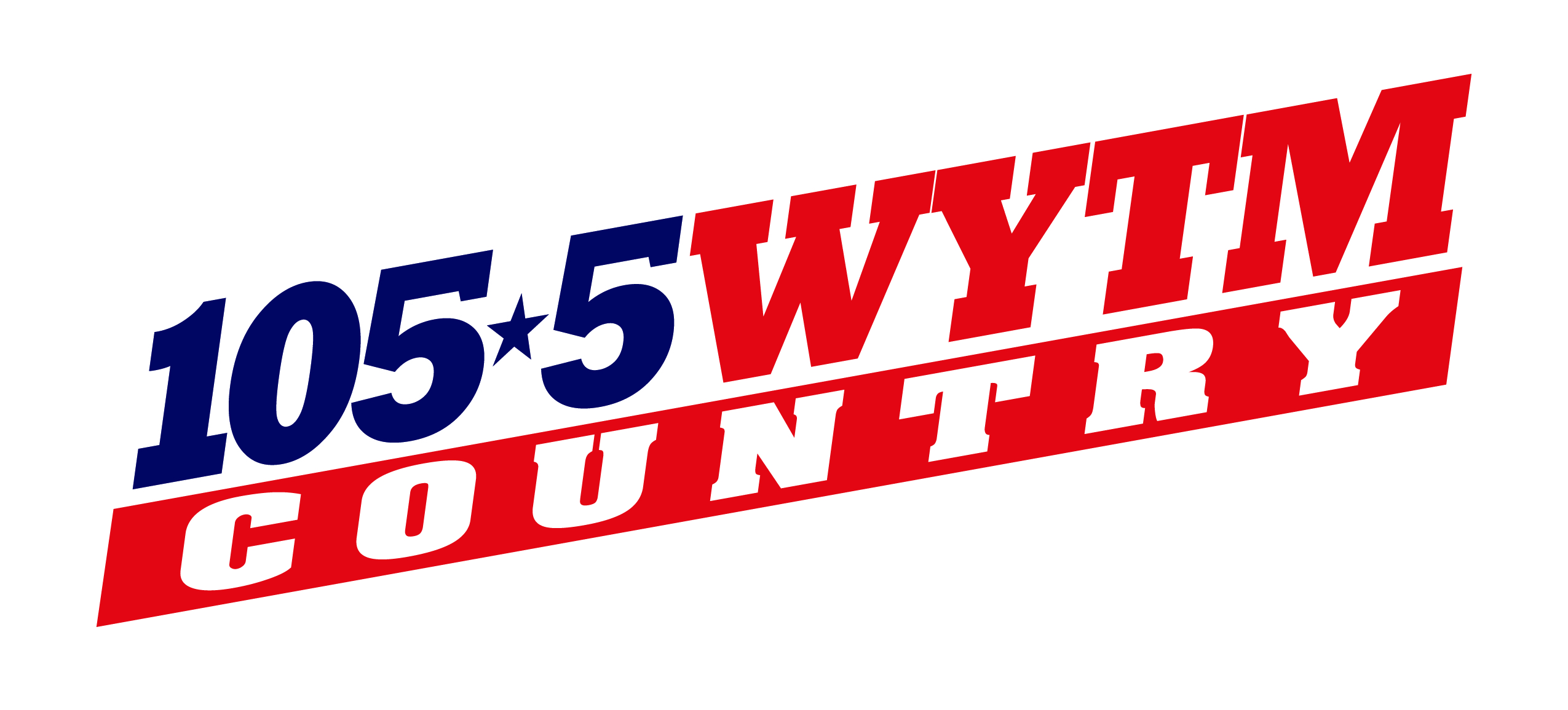
- Fayetteville, Tennessee; United States
- Frequency: 105.5 MHz
- Branding: 105.5 WYTM Country

Programming
- Format: Classic Country

Ownership
- Owner: John Malone; (Elk River Media LLC)
- Sister stations: WEKR

History
- First air date: 1970
- Call sign meaning: W Young Thompson Mason, the founding partners.

Technical information
- Licensing authority: FCC
- Facility ID: 67130
- Class: A
- ERP: 6,000 watts
- HAAT: 90.0 meters (295.3 ft)
- Transmitter coordinates: 35°7′39.00″N 86°34′49.00″W

Links
- Public license information: Public file; LMS
- Webcast: https://radio.securenetsystems.net/cwa/WYTM
- Website: www.1055wytm.com

WYTM-FM (105.5 WYTM Country) is a radio station broadcasting a country music format. Licensed to Fayetteville, Tennessee, United States, the station is owned by John Malone, through licensee Elk River Media LLC. WYTM-FM has been on the air since 1970 and is Lincoln County's only full power FM service. Local shows include Bryan & Tracie Mornings from 6-10am and middays with Jennifer Herron.

Bryan & Tracie Mornings has been on WYTM since February 14, 2022. This local morning radio show emphasizes community engagement, featuring segments that highlight local heroes, small businesses, and community events. Hosts Bryan Neece and Tracie Cowan collaborate with Fayetteville and Lincoln County businesses to offer listener opportunities, such as concert ticket giveaways. The show also includes a “Student of the Week” contest to recognize the achievements of local youth. Regular segments on the show include “Water Cooler Questions,” “Bryan & Tracie Music City Minute,” and “Where in the World is Tracie.” Additionally, the hosts frequently broadcast live from various locations within the community, such as the courthouse gazebo, to enhance their connection with local listeners.

== Format ==
105.5 WYTM Country has a classic country format, focusing on music from the 1980s and 1990s. Additional programming includes Roy Warren Quartet Time on Sunday mornings. Quartet Time, a program of gospel music, obituaries, prayer requests and dedications, began on sister station WEKR in 1948, hosted by Fayetteville Buick dealer Roy Warren. Since Mr. Warren's death, the show has been hosted by Jack Atchley. These are the only two hosts in the show's history.

Bryan & Tracie Mornings began on WYTM on February 14, 2022 after Ron Wood retired from the morning show.

WYTM is the home of Lincoln County Falcons football and basketball, as well as University of Tennessee Volunteers football and basketball.
