= Athens, Tennessee =

- City
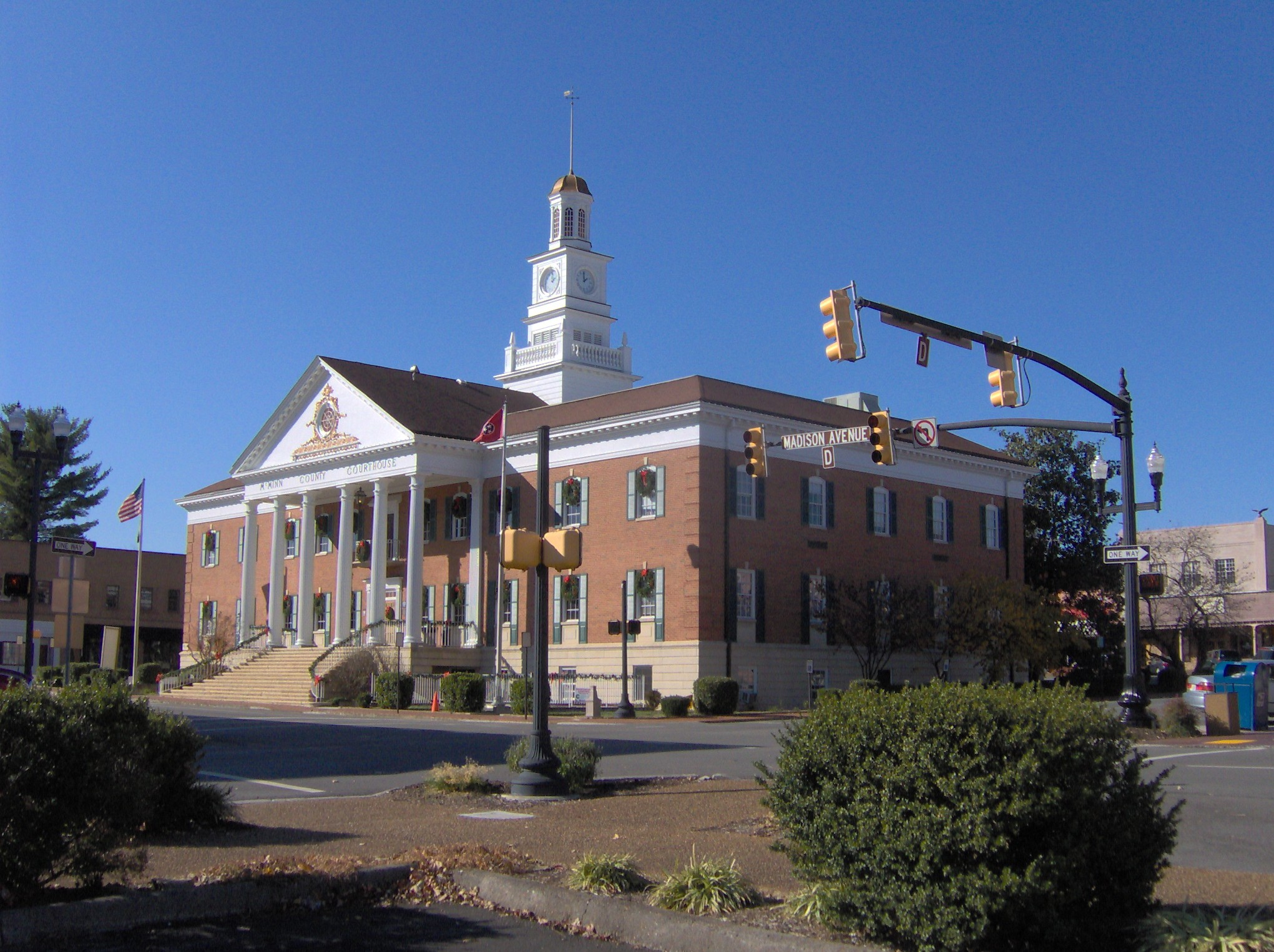
- McMinn County Courthouse in Athens
- Nickname: "The Friendly City"
- Motto: "Progress Since 1822"
- Location of Athens in McMinn County, Tennessee.

- Location in Tennessee Athens (the United States) Athens (North America)
- Coordinates: 35°26′53″N 84°36′7″W
- Country: United States
- State: Tennessee
- County: McMinn
- Founded: 1822
- Incorporated: 1870
- Named for: Athens, Greece

Government
  - Type: Council-manager
  - Mayor: Jordan Curtis
  - City Manager: Bridget Roberts (interim)

Area
  - Total: 15.51 sq mi (40.17 km^{2})
  - Land: 15.51 sq mi (40.17 km^{2})
  - Water: 0 sq mi (0.00 km^{2})
- Elevation: 860 ft (262 m)

Population (2020)
  - Total: 14,084
  - Density: 908.2/sq mi (350.65/km^{2})
- Time zone: UTC-5 (Eastern (EST))
  - Summer (DST): UTC-4 (EDT)
- ZIP codes: 37303 & 37371
- Area code: 423
- FIPS code: 47-02320
- GNIS feature ID: 1304889
- Website: www.cityofathenstn.com

Athens is the county seat of McMinn County, Tennessee, United States and the principal city of the Athens Micropolitan Statistical Area has a population of 53,569. The city is located almost equidistantly between the major cities of Knoxville and Chattanooga. The population was 14,084 at the 2020 census. The population estimate for 2024 was 15,050 for the U.S census

== History ==
=== Early history and Civil War ===
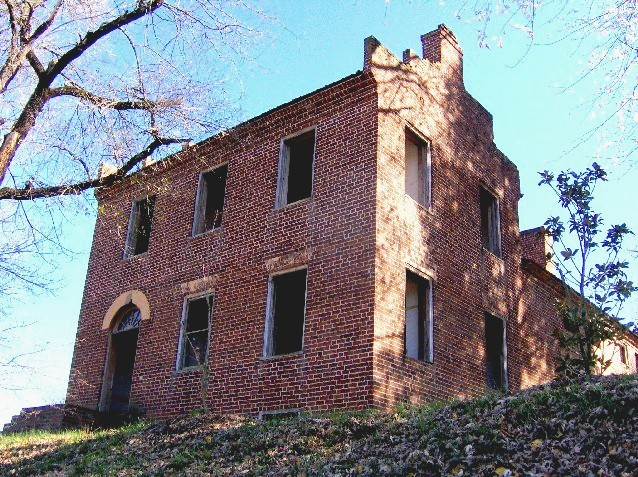
The Samuel Cleage House outside of Athens, set on the site of McElhaney and Sons Nursery, built in the 1820s

McMinn County was Cherokee territory at the time of the arrival of the first Euro-American explorers. The Athens area was situated nearly halfway between the Overhill Cherokee villages of Great Tellico to the north in Monroe County and Great Hiwassee along the Hiwassee River to the south. In 1819, the Cherokee signed the Calhoun Treaty, selling the land north of the Hiwassee (including all of modern McMinn County) to the United States. McMinn County was organized on November 13, 1819, at the home of John Walker in what is now Calhoun. The Native American village, Pumpkintown (a corruption of Potemkin town), was located on a farm about two miles east of present-day Athens. It is sometimes incorrectly identified as a forerunner of Athens. Athens was laid out and chosen as the county seat in 1822. The name "Athens" may have been chosen due to perceived topographical similarities to Athens, Greece.

By 1834, the population of Athens had grown to over 500. Prominent early settlers included William Henry Cooke, who operated an iron forge near modern Etowah, and Samuel Clegg (or Cleage), a construction entrepreneur. Jesse Mayfield, whose descendants founded Mayfield Dairy Farms, arrived in the early 1820s. The Hiwassee Railroad received a charter in the mid-1830s to build a railroad connecting Knoxville, Tennessee, and Dalton, Georgia. The railroad began construction in 1837, although financial and legal problems delayed its completion until 1851. In 1836, General John Wool arrived in Athens to help coordinate the Cherokee Removal. Although initially voluntary, the operation became a forced removal in 1838 when many Cherokee refused to leave. The removal culminated in the forced march west that became known as the Trail of Tears. Wool set up his headquarters at the Bridges Hotel, which was located across the street from the McMinn County Courthouse.

McMinn County was divided during the American Civil War. The well-established railroad brought numerous pro-secessionist and anti-secessionist speakers to the county, including Andrew Johnson, Horace Maynard, John Bell, and William "Parson" Brownlow. In 1861, McMinn County voted against secession by a narrow 1,144-904 margin. The county sent 12 units to the Union army and 8 units to the Confederate army. General William Tecumseh Sherman was briefly headquartered at the Bridges Hotel in McMinn County while preparing his "March to the Sea."

=== Post-Civil War ===
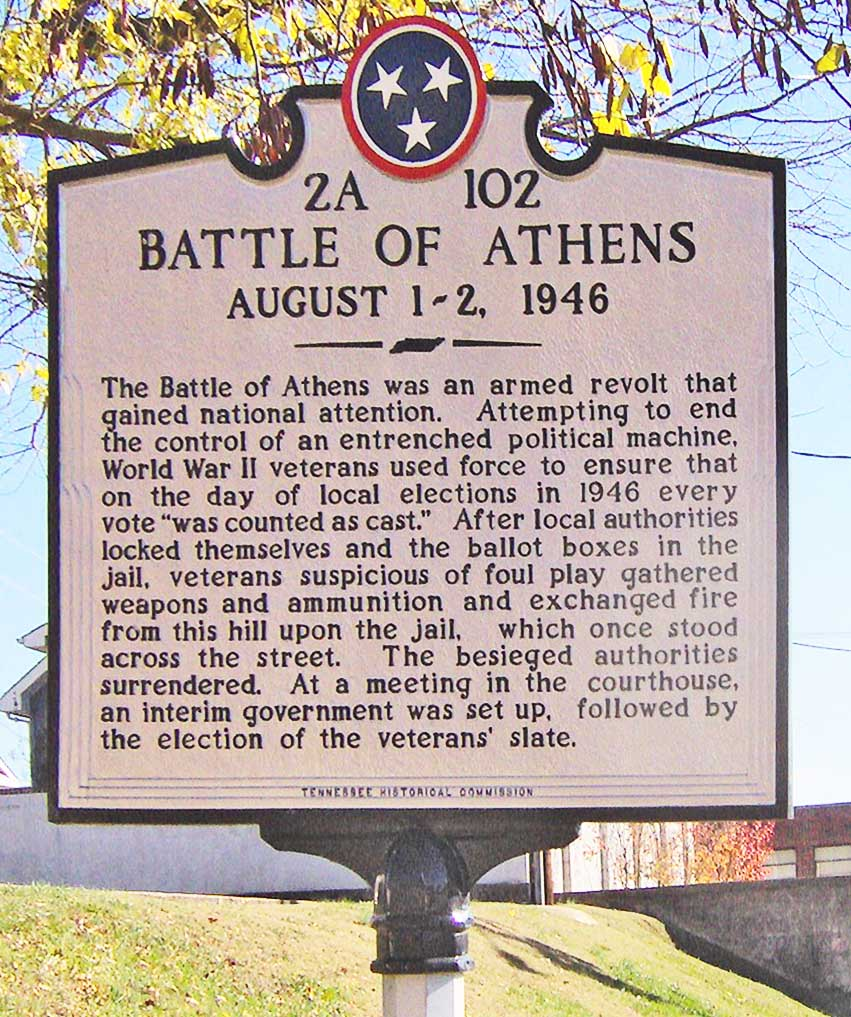
THC marker at the "Battle of Athens" site

After the Civil War, the railroad lured business opportunists to McMinn County. In 1887, several investors established the Athens Mining and Manufacturing Company with plans to convert the town into a model industrial community and initiate large-scale mining operations in the area. Textile mills, flour mills, and timber mills dominated the county's industry by the late 19th century, complemented by furniture and appliance factories in the 1920s.

In 1946, several McMinn County World War II veterans ran for local office in hopes of removing a county government deemed corrupt. On August 1, local authorities locked themselves in the county jail along with the ballot boxes. Suspecting foul play, the veterans armed themselves in revolt and assembled on a hill across the street from the jail. After an exchange of gunfire, the county authorities surrendered. The ballots were counted, and the veterans' ticket was elected, ending the Battle of Athens.

== Geography ==
Athens is located at 35°26′53″N 84°36′7″W (35.448171, -84.602069). The city is situated amidst a series of narrow, elongate ridges and low hills that are characteristic of the Appalachian Ridge-and-Valley Province. The Unicoi Mountains rise roughly 20 miles (32 km) east of Athens, and the Tennessee River flows nearly 20 miles (32 km) to the west. Starr Mountain, one of the more noticeable ridges in McMinn County, is located roughly 15 miles (24 km) southeast of Athens.

Oostanaula Creek (sometimes spelled "Eastanalle" or a similar variation) rises in the hills north of Athens and traverses the city approximately 30 miles (48 km) upstream from its mouth along Hiwassee River. Other major streams in the area include Mouse Creek, which parallels Oostanaula to the west, and Chestuee Creek, which parallels Oostanaula to the east.

Athens is centered around the junction of U.S. Route 11, which connects the city to Sweetwater to the north and Cleveland to the south, and State Route 30, which connects Athens to Etowah and U.S. Route 411 to the southeast and Decatur to the west. Interstate 75 passes west of Athens.

According to the United States Census Bureau, the city has a total area of 13.5 square miles (35 km^{2}), all land.

=== Climate ===
As is typical for the Southern United States, Athens has a humid subtropical climate (Köppen Cfa) featuring hot, humid summers and cool to cold, though not severe, winters.

Climate data for Athens, Tennessee (1991–2020 normals, extremes 1962–present)
Month	Jan	Feb	Mar	Apr	May	Jun	Jul	Aug	Sep	Oct	Nov	Dec	Year
Record high °F (°C)	74 (23)	81 (27)	85 (29)	91 (33)	95 (35)	103 (39)	105 (41)	103 (39)	99 (37)	98 (37)	86 (30)	77 (25)	105 (41)
Mean daily maximum °F (°C)	48.6 (9.2)	53.0 (11.7)	61.7 (16.5)	71.3 (21.8)	78.8 (26.0)	85.4 (29.7)	88.4 (31.3)	88.1 (31.2)	83.1 (28.4)	72.6 (22.6)	60.9 (16.1)	51.6 (10.9)	70.3 (21.3)
Daily mean °F (°C)	38.4 (3.6)	41.9 (5.5)	49.5 (9.7)	58.3 (14.6)	66.8 (19.3)	74.4 (23.6)	77.9 (25.5)	77.2 (25.1)	71.5 (21.9)	59.9 (15.5)	48.6 (9.2)	41.5 (5.3)	58.8 (14.9)
Mean daily minimum °F (°C)	28.2 (−2.1)	30.9 (−0.6)	37.3 (2.9)	45.3 (7.4)	54.8 (12.7)	63.4 (17.4)	67.5 (19.7)	66.3 (19.1)	59.9 (15.5)	47.2 (8.4)	36.2 (2.3)	31.3 (−0.4)	47.4 (8.6)
Record low °F (°C)	−16 (−27)	−14 (−26)	2 (−17)	22 (−6)	29 (−2)	36 (2)	48 (9)	48 (9)	29 (−2)	23 (−5)	9 (−13)	−4 (−20)	−16 (−27)
Average precipitation inches (mm)	5.56 (141)	5.07 (129)	5.51 (140)	5.50 (140)	4.59 (117)	5.03 (128)	5.52 (140)	4.03 (102)	5.20 (132)	3.58 (91)	4.88 (124)	5.91 (150)	60.38 (1,534)
Average snowfall inches (cm)	1.0 (2.5)	1.3 (3.3)	0.8 (2.0)	0.0 (0.0)	0.0 (0.0)	0.0 (0.0)	0.0 (0.0)	0.0 (0.0)	0.0 (0.0)	0.0 (0.0)	0.1 (0.25)	0.4 (1.0)	3.6 (9.1)
Average precipitation days (≥ 0.01 in)	11.6	11.9	12.4	10.9	11.5	11.7	12.1	10.3	8.4	8.2	9.6	12.4	131.0
Average snowy days (≥ 0.1 in)	0.7	0.7	0.2	0.0	0.0	0.0	0.0	0.0	0.0	0.0	0.1	0.3	2.0
Source: NOAA

== Demographics ==
Historical population
Census	Pop.	Note	%±
1860	678		—
1870	974		43.7%
1880	1,100		12.9%
1890	2,224		102.2%
1900	1,849		−16.9%
1910	2,264		22.4%
1920	2,580		14.0%
1930	5,385		108.7%
1940	6,930		28.7%
1950	8,618		24.4%
1960	12,103		40.4%
1970	11,790		−2.6%
1980	12,080		2.5%
1990	12,054		−0.2%
2000	13,220		9.7%
2010	13,458		1.8%
2020	14,084		4.7%

=== 2020 census ===
As of the 2020 census, Athens had a population of 14,084, a median age of 38.4 years, with 21.4% of residents under the age of 18 and 18.8% of residents 65 years of age or older. For every 100 females there were 92.0 males, and for every 100 females age 18 and over there were 87.4 males.

97.0% of residents lived in urban areas, while 3.0% lived in rural areas.

There were 5,710 households in Athens, of which 29.1% had children under the age of 18 living in them. Of all households, 39.9% were married-couple households, 18.6% were households with a male householder and no spouse or partner present, and 34.6% were households with a female householder and no spouse or partner present. About 34.4% of all households were made up of individuals and 14.8% had someone living alone who was 65 years of age or older.

There were 6,470 housing units, of which 11.7% were vacant. The homeowner vacancy rate was 2.7% and the rental vacancy rate was 7.1%.

Racial composition as of the 2020 census
Race	Number	Percent
White	11,246	79.8%
Black or African American	1,071	7.6%
American Indian and Alaska Native	53	0.4%
Asian	197	1.4%
Native Hawaiian and Other Pacific Islander	7	0.0%
Some other race	429	3.0%
Two or more races	1,081	7.7%
Hispanic or Latino (of any race)	1,041	7.4%

=== 2010 census ===
As of the census of 2010, there was a population of 13,458, with 5,704 households and 3,498 families residing in the city. The racial makeup of the city was 84.87% White, 9.12% Black, 0.35% Native American, 1.64% Asian, 0.04% Pacific Islander, and 2.61% from two or more races. Those of Hispanic or Latino origins constituted 5.27% of the population.

Out of all of the households, 61.33% were family households, 42.39% were married couples living together, 26.30% had children under the age of 18 living in them, 4.33% had a male householder with no wife present, and 14.60% had a female householder with no husband present. 34.52% of all households were made up of individuals, and 14.39% had someone living alone who was 65 years of age or older. The average household size was 2.27 and the average family size was 2.91.

The population was spread out, with 22.69% under the age of 18, 59.97% ages 18 to 64, and 17.34% age 65 and over. The median age was 39.1 years. 53.52% of the population were females and 46.48% were males.

The median household income was $31,062 and the median family income was $44,419. Males had a median income of $37,120 versus $28,889 for females. The per capita income for the city was $18,259. About 22.2% of families and 24.8% of the population were below the poverty line, including 35.8% of those under the age of 18 and 17.2% of those age 65 and over

=== 2000 census ===
As of the census of 2000, there was a population of 13,220, with 5,550 households and 3,590 families residing in the city. The population density was 976.3 inhabitants per square mile (377.0/km^{2}). There were 6,086 housing units at an average density of 449.4 per square mile (173.5/km^{2}). The racial makeup of the city was 86.33% White, 9.32% African American, 0.23% Native American, 1.38% Asian, 0.07% Pacific Islander, 1.34% from other races, and 1.33% from two or more races. Hispanic or Latino of any race were 3.01% of the population.

There were 5,550 households, out of which 30.0% had children under the age of 18 living with them, 47.2% were married couples living together, 14.8% had a female householder with no husband present, and 35.3% were non-families. 31.7% of all households were made up of individuals, and 13.0% had someone living alone who was 65 years of age or older. The average household size was 2.29 and the average family size was 2.89.

The population consisted of 23.9% under the age of 18, 10.1% from 18 to 24, 28.3% from 25 to 44, 21.4% from 45 to 64, and 16.3% who were 65 years of age or older. The median age was 36 years. For every 100 females, there were 84.8 males. For every 100 females age 18 and over, there were 80.2 males.

The median income for a household in the city was $29,277, and the median income for a family was $39,563. Males had a median income of $32,170 versus $20,917 for females. The per capita income for the city was $16,877. About 14.6% of families and 18.4% of the population were below the poverty line, including 22.6% of those under age 18 and 22.1% of those age 65 or over.

== Government ==
The City of Athens employs a Council-Manager form of government. Citizens elect a five-member council. Councilmembers are elected to four year terms, which are staggered. The Council is responsible for approving budgets, passing local ordinances, and setting policy, but members are forbidden by the City Charter from giving direct orders to city staff. The Council hires a City Manager, who is responsible for hiring, firing, and managing city staff. A Council Study Session takes place once per month, and a City Council Meeting takes place once per month.

Law enforcement services in Athens are provided by the City of Athens Police Department. The Department's authorized strength is thirty-two sworn officers.

Athens, TN City Council
City Council Role	Name
Mayor	Jordan Curtis
Vice Mayor	Lou Pascarella
Council Member	John M. Duggan
Council Member	Abby Burke-Carroll
Council Member	H. Chris Trew

== Education ==
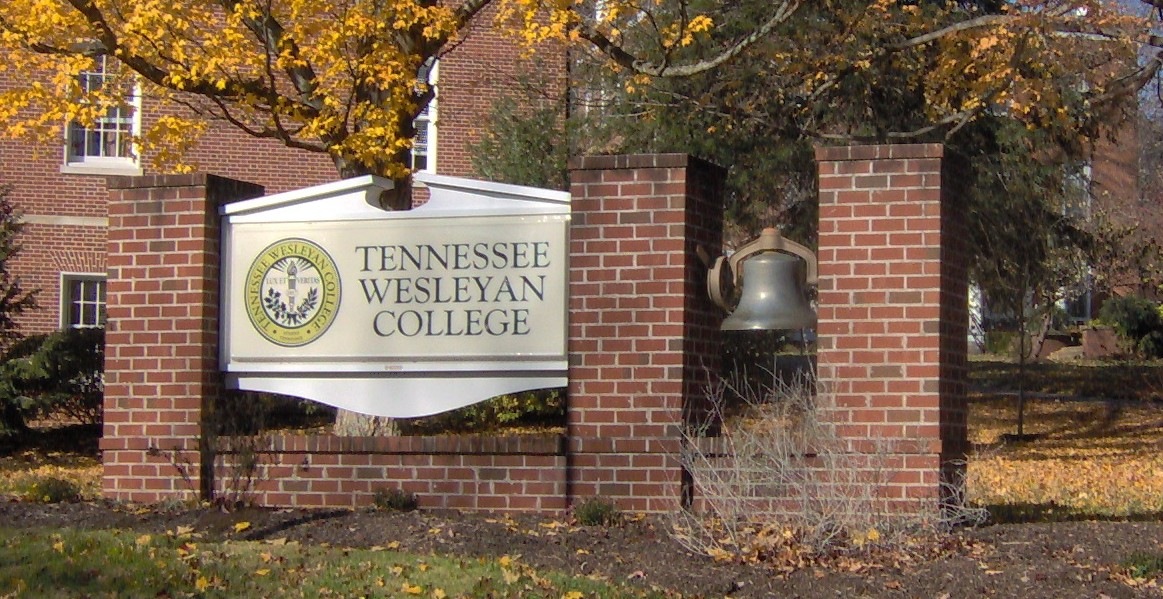
Tennessee Wesleyan University, organized in 1857

University and vocational school:

- McMinn County Higher Education Center
- Tennessee Wesleyan University
- Tennessee College of Applied Technology of Athens

McMinn County Schools operates public high schools serving the city.

High schools:

- McMinn County High School

Athens City Schools operates public elementary and middle schools.

Middle schools:

- Athens City Middle School

Elementary schools:

- City Park
- West Side
- North City
- Ingleside

Rogers Creek and E.K. Baker schools, operated by McMinn Schools, are not in the Athens city limits, despite having Athens postal addresses.

Private schools:

Fairview Christian Academy ( K-12)

Christ Legacy Academy (K-12)

== Notable people ==
- Eric Axley - professional golfer who plays on the PGA Tour
- George Washington Bridges - Congressman and Southern Unionist
- Febb Burn - key player in the passing of the Nineteenth Amendment to the United States Constitution, died in Athens
- J. Lawrence Cook - piano roll artist.
- John Tyler Morgan - represented Alabama in the United States Senate as a staunch segregationist. Served in the Confederate Army as a brigadier general.
- JaJuan Smith - former basketball player for the University of Tennessee, played at McMinn County High School

== Athens media ==
McMinn County is covered by both the Chattanooga and Knoxville media markets. Athens is served by one daily newspaper publication, The Daily Post Athenian as well as seven radio stations, (four FM, and three AM), and one Comcast TV channel, 95.

- FM
  - Jack FM Country, (which is actually licensed to Hopewell, Tennessee)
  - WJSQ Country
  - J-103 religious (licensed to Etowah, TN) simulcast with WBDX in Chattanooga
  - WKPJ-LP 104.5 religious, an affiliate of 3ABN Radio Network
- AM
  - WCPH 1220 Adult Standards, (licensed to Etowah, TN) an affiliate of The Music of Your Life
  - WYXI 1390 Oldies
  - WLAR 1450 Oldies (Formerly Simulcast of WJSQ)

== Sister city ==
Isahaya, Nagasaki Prefecture, Japan
