= WUTZ =

Summertown, Tennessee; United States
- Frequency: 88.3 MHz

Programming
- Format: Defunct

Ownership
- Owner: Radio Free Broadcasting Company

Technical information
- Licensing authority: FCC
- Facility ID: 54583
- Class: D
- ERP: 10 watts
- HAAT: 56.0 meters (183.7 ft)
- Transmitter coordinates: 35°28′45.00″N 87°19′48.00″W

Links
- Public license information: Public file; LMS

WUTZ (88.3 FM) was a radio station licensed to Summertown, Tennessee, United States. The station was owned by Radio Free Broadcasting Company. The station's license was cancelled on April 14, 2020.
