= WKZX-FM =

Radio station in Lenoir City–Knoxville, Tennessee

- Lenoir City, Tennessee; United States
- Broadcast area: Knoxville, Tennessee
- Frequency: 93.5 MHz
- Branding: La Líder

Programming
- Format: Regional Mexican

Ownership
- Owner: BP Broadcasters LLC

History
- First air date: September 19, 1967
- Former call signs: WLIL-FM (1967–2000)

Technical information
- Licensing authority: FCC
- Facility ID: 73210
- Class: A
- ERP: 2,000 watts
- HAAT: 176 meters (577 ft)
- Transmitter coordinates: 35°42′38.2″N 84°10′45.6″W

Links
- Public license information: Public file; LMS
- Website: www.laliderwkzx.com

WKZX-FM (93.5 FM) is a radio station broadcasting a Regional Mexican format. Licensed to Lenoir City, Tennessee, it serves the Knoxville, Tennessee, area.

== History ==
Arthur Wilkerson, owner of WLIL (730 AM), applied for an FM frequency on June 16, 1967. The Federal Communications Commission granted the construction permit on September 1 of that year, and WLIL-FM signed on at 93.5 on September 19, partially simulcasting the AM frequency. It was the second attempt at FM radio from WLIL; Wilkerson had shut down the first, which operated at 100.3—later 100.5—MHz from 1952 to 1955, because he felt if WSM could not make a go of it in Nashville, he could not in Lenoir City.

In addition to his radio stations, Wilkerson owned a lumber mill and built custom homes. He served as president of the Tennessee Association of Broadcasters. Wilkerson was also a pilot and restaurant owner.

Wilkerson died in 1998. Two years later, B.P. Broadcasters purchased WLIL-AM-FM, which at the time ran country music formats, for $1 million. B.P. built a new FM tower in the Glendale community near the Loudon-Blount county line. The call letters of the FM station were changed to WKZX-FM on September 20, 2000, and the station changed formats to adult contemporary.

In 2004, WKZX-FM flipped to Regional Mexican.
