= WCRK =

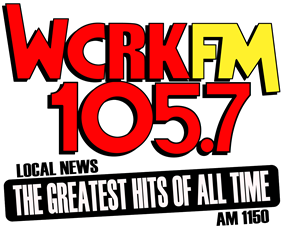
- Morristown, Tennessee; United States
- Frequency: 1150 kHz
- Branding: 105.7 WCRK FM

Programming
- Format: Classic hits
- Affiliations: ABC News Radio

Ownership
- Owner: Radio Acquisition Corp.
- Sister stations: WMTN

History
- First air date: 1947

Technical information
- Licensing authority: FCC
- Facility ID: 71294
- Class: B
- Power: 5,000 watts day 500 watts night
- Transmitter coordinates: 36°14′11.00″N 83°18′33.00″W
- Translator: 105.7 W289BQ (Morristown)

Links
- Public license information: Public file; LMS
- Webcast: Listen Live
- Website: wcrk.com

WCRK (1150 AM; "Hometown Radio") is a radio station broadcasting a classic hits music format. Licensed to Morristown, Tennessee, United States, the station is currently owned by Radio Acquisition Corp. and features programming from ABC News Radio / The Vol Network / Tennessee Titans Radio Network.
