= WJLE-FM =

WJLE and WJLE-FM

Smithville, Tennessee; United States
- Frequencies: WJLE: 1480 kHz; WJLE-FM: 101.7 MHz
- Branding: Class Country

Programming
- Format: Country

Ownership
- Owner: Center Hill Broadcasting Corp., Inc.
- Sister stations: WJLE-FM

Technical information
- Licensing authority: FCC
- Facility ID: WJLE: 37053; WJLE-FM: 37052
- Class: WJLE: D; WJLE-FM: A
- Power: WJLE: 1,000 watts (day); 34 watts (night)
- ERP: WJLE-FM: 4,400 watts
- HAAT: WJLE-FM: 59.0 meters (193.6 ft)
- Transmitter coordinates: WJLE: 35°55′31″N 85°49′14″W; WJLE-FM: 35°55′31.00″N 85°49′14.00″W

Links
- Public license information: WJLE: Public file; LMS; WJLE-FM: Public file; LMS
- Webcast: Listen live
- Website: wjle.com

WJLE (1480 AM) and WJLE-FM (101.7 FM) are a pair of American radio stations broadcasting a country music format. The duopoly is licensed to Smithville, Tennessee. The stations are currently owned by the Center Hill Broadcasting Corporation.
