= WUCZ =

- Carthage, Tennessee; United States
- Frequency: 104.1 MHz
- Branding: 104.1 The Ranch

Programming
- Format: New Country
- Affiliations: Dial Global

Ownership
- Owner: Wood Broadcasting, Inc.
- Sister stations: WRKM

History
- Former call signs: WRKM-FM (?-1987)

Technical information
- Licensing authority: FCC
- Facility ID: 73600
- Class: A
- ERP: 4,900 watts
- HAAT: 110.0 meters (360.9 ft)
- Transmitter coordinates: 36°18′43.00″N 85°57′8.00″W

Links
- Public license information: Public file; LMS
- Webcast: Listen live
- Website: 1041theranch.net

WUCZ (104.1 FM, "104.1 The Ranch") is a radio station broadcasting a new country music format. Licensed to Carthage, Tennessee, United States, the station is currently owned by Wood Broadcasting, Inc. and features programming from Dial Global.
