= WTNW =

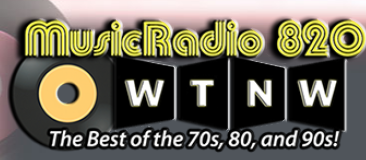
- Jasper, Tennessee; United States
- Broadcast area: Chattanooga Metro Area
- Frequency: 820 kHz
- Branding: Music Radio 820

Programming
- Format: Defunct (formerly Variety Hits)
- Affiliations: ABC Radio News; Tennessee Radio Network

Ownership
- Owner: Shelton Broadcasting System; (Shelton Broadcasting System)

History
- First air date: 1986
- Former call signs: WAPO (1986–1993); WWAM (1993–2012)
- Call sign meaning: The "TN" was chosen when changing the format to country to represent "Tennessee", the state where the station was located and licensed.

Technical information
- Facility ID: 51856
- Class: D
- Power: 1,000 watts day
- Transmitter coordinates: 35°4′23.00″N 85°37′39.00″W

WTNW (820 AM, "Music Radio 820") was a radio station broadcasting a variety hits format, licensed to Jasper, Tennessee, United States.

The station originally signed-on the air in 1986 playing an adult contemporary format as WAPO, taking the former call-letters of what is now WGOW-AM in Chattanooga. The station switched to an all gospel format around 1990, before changing owners and call-letters in 1993.

The station featured weekday programming, the John & Heidi Show mornings with hosts John and Heidi Small from 6:00am to 10:00am Central Time. Maddy Jones and Maddy in the Midday from 10:00am until 2:00pm, and The B-Side With Joshua Wayne afternoons from 2:00pm until 6:00pm. Logan Carmichael covered news and local events and could also be heard on weekends, and the station featured its own locally produced and hosted bluegrass show, Cold Mountain Bluegrass, hosted by Kyle Holland on Saturday mornings from 8:00am–10:00am Central Time. Sundays were dedicated to a variety of Southern gospel and various religious paid programming.

WTNW was also the flagship station for Marion County High School Warriors football broadcasts each fall.

WTNW was owned by Shelton Broadcasting System.

On Saturday, December 31, 2016, a fire destroyed the historic house at 4306 Main Street in Jasper which housed the transmitting equipment, offices, and studios of WTNW.

The station filed for authorization with the FCC to go silent for an undetermined time, which was granted on January 30, 2017. The FCC cancelled WTNW's license on March 12, 2019, due to the station having been silent since January 1, 2017.
