= WUTS =

Sewanee, Tennessee; United States
- Frequency: 91.3 MHz

Programming
- Format: Defunct (formerly College radio)

Ownership
- Owner: University of the South

History
- First air date: 1972
- Last air date: January 29, 2020
- Former call signs: WUTS (1972–1979); WUTS-FM (1979)
- Call sign meaning: University of the South

Technical information
- Licensing authority: FCC
- Facility ID: 69047
- Class: A
- ERP: 14 watts
- HAAT: 200.0 meters
- Transmitter coordinates: 35°12′23.00″N 85°55′4.00″W

Links
- Public license information: Public file; LMS

WUTS (91.3 FM) was a radio station licensed to Sewanee, Tennessee, United States. The station was owned by the University of the South from its licensure in 1981 until the university relinquished the license to the Federal Communications Commission on January 29, 2020.

WUTS broadcast a combination of alternative and classic rock, jazz, blues and classical music programming. The station was staffed entirely by student volunteers, and received an annual allocation of operating funds from the University.

The first incarnation of student radio at Sewanee was as an unlicensed AM carrier current station in early 1972. Later in that year, WUTS was officially licensed to broadcast with 10 watts on 88.1 FM. Its studios were located in the basement of Thompson Student Union. In 1974, WUTS moved into custom-built studios on the 2nd floor of a new student union, The Bishops’ Common, where it remained until closure.

In the mid 1970s, the U.S. Federal Communications Commission (FCC) required WUTS to move its frequency to 91.5 FM, in order to not interfere with a new, higher-powered station in Chattanooga on the same FM channel. In 1981, WUTS was granted a construction permit from the FCC. With it came yet another frequency change, to 91.3 FM, where it remained until closure.
