= WNTT =

- Tazewell, Tennessee; United States
- Frequency: 1250 kHz
- Branding: First in Country

Programming
- Format: Country
- Affiliations: AP Radio; Westwood One

Ownership
- Owner: WNTT, Inc.

History
- First air date: 1960
- Last air date: 2022

Technical information
- Facility ID: 73351
- Class: D
- Power: 500 watts day; 34 watts night
- Transmitter coordinates: 36°26′49″N 83°34′19″W
- Translator: 93.7 W229DA (Tazewell)

WNTT (1250 AM) was a radio station broadcasting a mostly mixed country music format. Licensed to Tazewell, Tennessee, United States, the station was last owned by WNTT, Inc. and featured local programming on a 24/7 schedule. WNTT's owners surrendered its license to the Federal Communications Commission on October 20, 2022, and the license was cancelled on October 27, 2022.
