= WKOM =

- Columbia, Tennessee; United States
- Frequency: 101.7 MHz
- Branding: 101.7 WKOM

Programming
- Format: News/Talk
- Affiliations: owned by Kennedy Broadcasting Company

Ownership
- Sister stations: WKRM

History
- First air date: 1967
- Call sign meaning: W King Of Memphis

Technical information
- Licensing authority: FCC
- Facility ID: 41996
- Class: A
- ERP: 4,100 watts
- HAAT: 118 meters (387 ft)
- Transmitter coordinates: 35°37′5″N 87°2′33″W

Links
- Public license information: Public file; LMS
- Webcast: Listen Live
- Website: wkomradio.com

WKOM (101.7 FM) is a radio station broadcasting a news/talk/classic hits format. Licensed to Columbia, Tennessee, United States, the station is currently owned by Middle Tennessee Broadcasting Company and features programming from Premiere Radio Networks and Motor Racing Network.
