= WENR (AM) =

Radio station in Englewood, Tennessee

- Englewood, Tennessee; United States
- Frequency: 1090 kHz
- Branding: 105.5 Jake FM

Programming
- Format: Adult hits

Ownership
- Owner: Michael R. Beverly

History
- First air date: April 21, 1967
- Former call signs: WENR (1967–1980); WEHA (1980–1981)

Technical information
- Licensing authority: FCC
- Facility ID: 39379
- Class: D
- Power: 1,000 watts day
- Transmitter coordinates: 35°25′35.3″N 84°30′56.7″W
- Translator: 105.5 W288EL (Athens)

Links
- Public license information: Public file; LMS
- Webcast: Listen live
- Website: www.1055jakefm.com

WENR (1090 kHz) is an AM radio station licensed to Englewood, Tennessee, which programs an adult hits format. The station broadcasts at a power of 1,000 watts and is owned by Michael R. Beverly. Because WENR shares the same frequency as former class I-B "clear-channel" station WBAL in Baltimore, Maryland, it broadcasts only during daylight hours and is required to sign off at sunset each night.

The station also simulcasts on translator station W288EL (105.5 FM) 24 hours a day.

On March 2, 2026, WENR changed its format from classic rock to adult hits, branded as "105.5 Jake FM".
