= WLAR =

Radio station in Athens, Tennessee, United States

- Athens, Tennessee; United States
- Frequency: 1450 kHz
- Branding: Athens Greatest Hits; WLAR

Programming
- Format: Classic hits
- Affiliations: ABC News Radio; Motor Racing Network

Ownership
- Owner: Randall W. Sliger

History
- First air date: 1946; 80 years ago

Technical information
- Licensing authority: FCC
- Facility ID: 29953
- Class: C
- Power: 1,000 watts unlimited
- Transmitter coordinates: 35°26′44.00″N 84°36′43.00″W
- Translators: 95.1 W236DC (Athens); 106.9 W295DF (Madisonville)

Links
- Public license information: Public file; LMS

WLAR (1450 AM, "Athens Greatest Hits") is a radio station broadcasting the Classic Hits format from Westwood One. Licensed to Athens, Tennessee, the station is owned by Randall W. Sliger, and features programming from ABC News Radio and Motor Racing Network. In February 2012, WLAR began simulcasting on FM translator W235AZ 94.9 MHz, also licensed to Athens, through an agreement with owner The Lynn Family Trust (now W236DC). WLAR first began broadcasting in 1946.
