= WMTN (AM) =

Morristown, Tennessee; United States
- Frequency: 1300 kHz
- Branding: Country Legends 93.3

Programming
- Format: Classic country
- Affiliations: ABC News Radio; Motor Racing Network; Performance Racing Network

Ownership
- Owner: Radio Acquisition Corp.
- Sister stations: WCRK

Technical information
- Licensing authority: FCC
- Facility ID: 22338
- Class: D
- Power: AM: 5,000 watts (day); 96 watts (night)
- ERP: FM: 250 watts
- Transmitter coordinates: 36°12′15.00″N 83°19′57.00″W

Links
- Public license information: Public file; LMS
- Webcast: Listen live
- Website: www.countrylegends933.com

WMTN (1300 kHz, "Classic Country 93.3") is a commercial AM radio station broadcasting a classic country music format. Licensed to Morristown, Tennessee, United States, the station is currently owned by Radio Acquisition Corp. and features programming from ABC News Radio, Motor Racing Network and Performance Racing Network.

== FM Translator ==
In addition to the main (originating) station on 1300 AM, WMTN is heard on 93.3 MHz via an FM translator:

Call sign	Frequency	City of license	FID	ERP (W)	Class	FCC info
W227DH	93.3 FM	Morristown, Tennessee	59720	250	D	LMS
