= WCLC-FM =

Coordinates: 36.313°N 84.937°W

- Jamestown, Tennessee; United States
- Broadcast area: Jamestown, Tennessee and Vicinity
- Frequency: 105.1 MHz
- Branding: New Life 105

Programming
- Format: Gospel
- Affiliations: Moody Broadcasting Network

Ownership
- Owner: New Life Studios, Inc.

History
- First air date: June 19, 1985

Technical information
- Licensing authority: FCC
- Facility ID: 30298
- Class: A
- ERP: 6,000 watts
- HAAT: 100 meters

Links
- Public license information: Public file; LMS
- Website: newlife105.com

WCLC-FM (branded as New Life 105) is a Southern gospel formatted broadcast radio station licensed to Jamestown, Tennessee, serving Jamestown and the vicinity. WCLC-FM is owned and operated by New Life Studios, Inc. and features most of the programming from the Moody Broadcasting Network. It simulcast on its daytimer sister station WCLC, until WCLC's license was cancelled on August 24, 2021.

== History ==
WCLC-FM began their broadcasting activities in the summer of 1985 and has since then maintained its gospel format.
