= WIHG =

- Rockwood, Tennessee; United States
- Frequency: 105.7 MHz (HD Radio)
- Branding: 105.7 The Hog

Programming
- Format: Classic hits
- Subchannels: HD2: WVVB simulcast HD3: WXRH simulcast HD4: Christian adult contemporary "Spirit 101.9"

Ownership
- Owner: John Tollett; (3B Properties, Inc.)

History
- First air date: 1991 (as WOFE-FM)
- Former call signs: WOFE-FM (1990–2003); WWSR (2003–2007); WLSQ (2007–2007)

Technical information
- Licensing authority: FCC
- Facility ID: 51113
- Class: C3
- ERP: 2,400 watts
- HAAT: 309 meters (1,014 ft)
- Transmitter coordinates: 35°53′27.00″N 84°52′1.00″W
- Translator: HD4: 101.9 W270BI (Crossville)

Links
- Public license information: Public file; LMS
- Webcast: Listen live
- Website: 1057thehog.com

WIHG (105.7 FM, "The Hog") is a classic hits radio station licensed to Rockwood, Tennessee, United States. The station is currently owned by John Tollett, through licensee 3B Properties, Inc. The station has obtained a construction permit from the FCC for a power increase to 2,400 watts.

== History ==
The station went on the air as WOFE-FM on 1990-03-19. On 2003-06-11, the station changed its call sign to WWSR, on 2007-02-26 to WLSQ, and to its current WIHG on 2007-07-16.
