= WOCV (AM) =

Oneida, Tennessee; United States
- Frequency: 1310 kHz

Ownership
- Owner: Oneida Broadcasters, Inc.

History
- First air date: 1959
- Last air date: 2020
- Former call signs: WBNT (1959–1988)

Technical information
- Facility ID: 50359
- Class: D
- Power: 1,000 watts day
- Transmitter coordinates: 36°30′3.3″N 84°29′23.8″W

WOCV (1310 AM) was a radio station licensed to Oneida, Tennessee, United States, which was owned by Oneida Broadcasters, Inc. Its license expired August 1, 2020.
