= WSM-FM (1941–1951) =

Radio station in Nashville, Tennessee

- Nashville, Tennessee; United States
- Frequencies: 44.7 MHz (1941–1946); 100.1 MHz (1946–1947); 103.3 MHz (1947–1951)

Programming
- Affiliations: NBC

Ownership
- Owner: National Life and Accident Insurance Company
- Sister stations: WSM; WSM-TV

History
- First air date: March 1, 1941, as W47NV
- Last air date: March 15, 1951
- Former call signs: W47NV (1941–1943)
- Call sign meaning: Sister station of WSM

Technical information
- Power: 20,000 watts (W47NV); 66,000 watts (on 103.3 in 1950)
- HAAT: 878 feet (268 meters) above ground

WSM-FM was a commercial radio station that was operated by the National Life and Accident Insurance Company in Nashville, Tennessee, United States, beginning on March 1, 1941. Under its original call sign of W47NV, it was described at the time as the first fully licensed commercial FM station in the nation. However, after ten years of financial losses, the station ceased operations on March 15, 1951.

== History ==
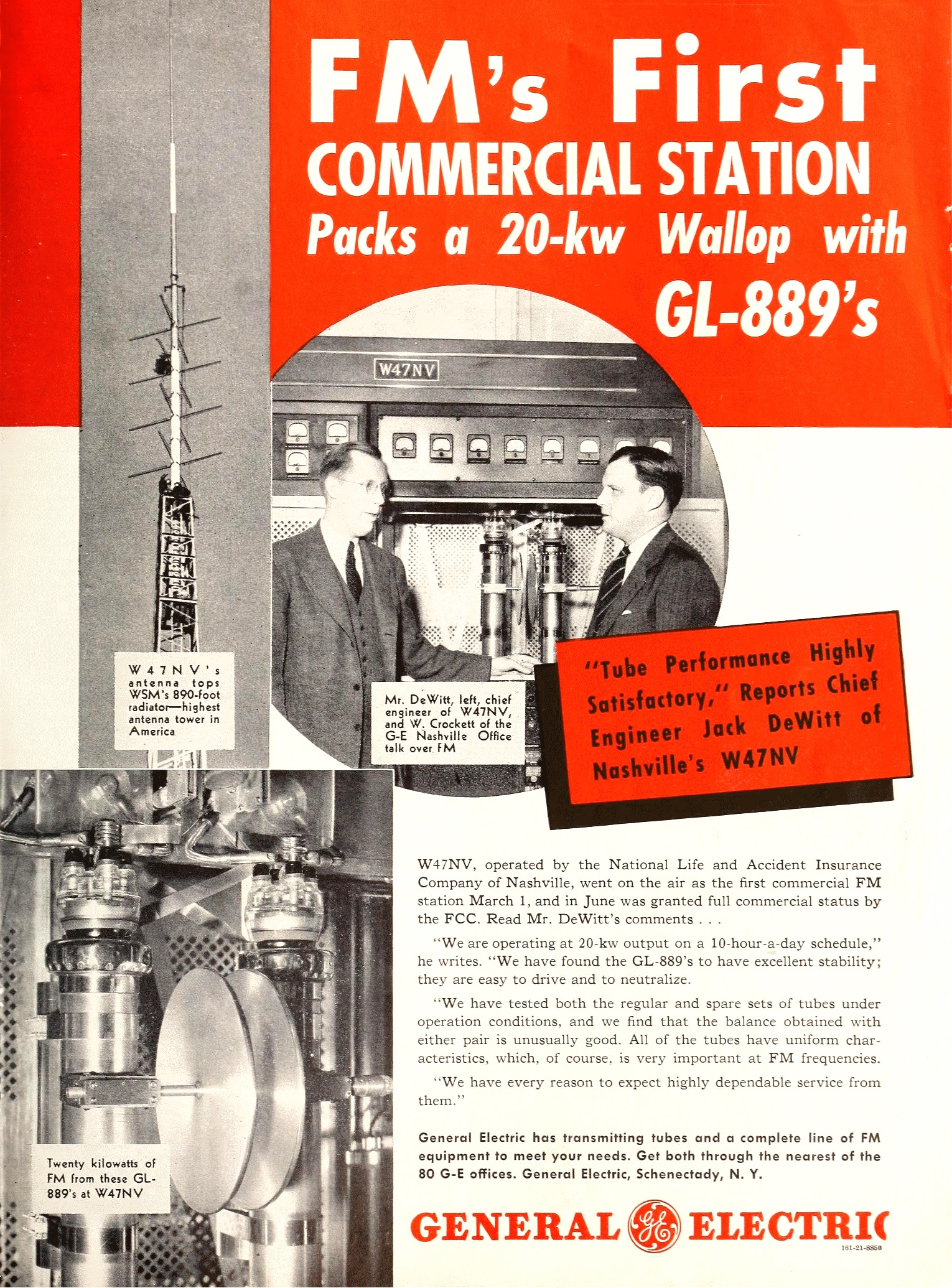
August 1941 General Electric advertisement promoting use of its transmitter vacuum tubes at W47NV.

At the time W47NV made its debut broadcast, its owner, the National Life and Accident Insurance Company, already had extensive broadcasting experience, beginning with AM station WSM, which it founded in 1925. In addition, the new FM station was in large part the successor to a non-commercial, experimental, high-fidelity AM "Apex" station, W4XA, which operated for two years beginning in 1939.

In 1940 the Federal Communications Commission (FCC) announced the establishment, effective January 1, 1941, of an FM band operating on 40 channels spanning 42–50 MHz. (In 1946 this was changed to 88–106 MHz, and still later to 88–108 MHz, which increased the number of channels to 100.) WSM staff had already expressed interest in establishing an FM station. With the support of National Life head Edwin Wilson Craig, chief engineer John DeWitt, Jr. spearheaded the new station's construction, which was sped by local engineers fabricating some parts that were not yet available from established manufacturers.

The station was issued the callsign W47NV (Note: The initial policy for commercial FM station call signs included an initial "W" for stations located east of the Mississippi River, followed by the last two digits of a station's frequency assignment, "47" in this case, and closing with a one or two character city identifier, which for Nashville stations was "NV".) and assigned to transmit on 44.7 MHz. It began broadcasting on a regular schedule on March 1, 1941, and was reported to be the first commercial FM to become fully licensed: although a few FM stations had begun broadcasting earlier, they were operating under experimental or "Special Temporary Authorizations" and had not yet been granted operating licenses. At its start the station operated on a regular weekly schedule totaling 70 hours, with broadcasts from 1 to 11 p.m. weekdays and 11 a.m. to 9 p.m. Sundays. Programming was generally separate from the AM station and showcased classical music. W47NV's first commercial program—the first ever by an FM station—was sponsored by the Standard Candy Co. of Nashville.

Effective November 1, 1943, the FCC modified its policy for FM station call letters, and the call sign was changed to WSM-FM. In 1946, as part of a transfer of stations to the new FM band, WSM-FM was assigned to 100.1 MHz. Although some stations broadcast simultaneously on both their old and new frequencies during this transition, WSM-FM did not, and the station announced that it was "signing off temporarily" on June 1, 1946, in order to install the new transmitting equipment. In 1947, as part of a nationwide reallocation, WSM-FM was reassigned to 103.3 MHz.

Following years of unprofitability, National Life decided to shut down WSM-FM permanently on March 15, 1951, and returned its license to the FCC for cancellation, because few area households had FM radios and commercial potential was lacking. John H. DeWitt, now WSM president, issued a statement reviewing the ten years of operation, noting "We have continued this operation in spite of the fact that the audience was very disappointing and that the station operated at a complete loss during the entire period. This loss has amounted to nearly one quarter of a million dollars to date." To partially make up for the loss of WSM-FM's musical programming, a daily noontime program of one hour of classical music was announced for the AM station.

National Life's original station, WSM (which it owned until 1981), and television station WSM-TV (now WSMV-TV), established in 1950, were both commercially successful. In 1967 National Life returned to FM broadcasting when it purchased WLWM and revived the WSM-FM call letters the next year.
