= WYGO =

- Madisonville, Tennessee; United States
- Broadcast area: Sweetwater, Tennessee
- Frequency: 99.5 MHz
- Branding: Y99.5

Programming
- Format: Hot adult contemporary

Ownership
- Owner: Major Broadcasting Corporation

History
- First air date: 1993
- Call sign meaning: WhY GO anywhere else And for the station name Y 99.5

Technical information
- Licensing authority: FCC
- Facility ID: 39691
- Class: A
- ERP: 2,700 watts
- HAAT: 149 meters (489 feet)
- Transmitter coordinates: 35°31′19″N 84°27′29″W

Links
- Public license information: Public file; LMS
- Website: 995wygo.com

WYGO (99.5 FM, "Y99.5") is a radio station licensed to serve Madisonville, Tennessee, United States. The station is owned by Major Broadcasting Corporation. It airs a hot adult contemporary music format.

The station was assigned the WYGO call letters by the Federal Communications Commission on August 9, 1991. These call letters were used on the same frequency at another station in Corbin, Kentucky, from 1978-1989 (now WKDP-FM) and at an AM station in Atlanta, Georgia from 1989-1990 (now WXJO).
