= WCLC (AM) =

Coordinates: 36°26′10″N 84°55′42″W

Jamestown, Tennessee; United States
- Broadcast area: Jamestown, Tennessee and Vicinity
- Frequency: 1260 kHz

Programming
- Format: Defunct (formerly Religious)

Ownership
- Owner: New Life Studios, Inc.
- Sister stations: WCLC-FM

History
- First air date: 1957
- Last air date: August 24, 2021

Technical information
- Facility ID: 30297
- Class: D
- Power: 1,000 watts daytime only

WCLC was a broadcast radio station licensed to Jamestown, Tennessee, serving Jamestown and the vicinity. WCLC was owned and operated by New Life Studios, Inc. and it simulcast their programming from sister station WCLC-FM "New Life 105". This station operated only during the daytime hours.
