= WTAZ-LP =

- New Tazewell, Tennessee; United States
- Frequency: 98.3 MHz
- Branding: Listener Supported Radio

Programming
- Format: Defunct (formerly Variety)

Ownership
- Owner: Claiborne Communications Inc.

Technical information
- Licensing authority: FCC
- Facility ID: 133423
- Class: L1
- ERP: 8 watts
- HAAT: 105.5 meters (346 ft)
- Transmitter coordinates: 36°26′12.00″N 83°36′37.00″W

Links
- Public license information: LMS

WTAZ-LP (98.3 FM, "Listener Supported Radio") was a radio station broadcasting a Variety music format. Formerly licensed to New Tazewell, Tennessee, United States, the station was owned by Claiborne Communications Inc.

WTAZ-LP's license was cancelled by the Federal Communications Commission on September 18, 2013, due to the station having been silent for more than twelve months.
