= WRJB =

- Camden, Tennessee; United States
- Frequency: 95.9 MHz
- Branding: B95

Programming
- Format: Country
- Affiliations: Tennessee Volunteers football Tennessee Titans Radio Network

Ownership
- Owner: Liberty Radio, Inc.

History
- First air date: 1976 (at 98.3)
- Former frequencies: 98.3 MHz (1976–2003)

Technical information
- Licensing authority: FCC
- Facility ID: 69768
- Class: A
- ERP: 6,000 watts
- HAAT: 87 meters (285 feet)
- Transmitter coordinates: 36°03′26″N 88°06′14″W
- Translator: 99.7 W259BN (Camden)

Links
- Public license information: Public file; LMS
- Webcast: Listen Live
- Website: wrjbradio.com

WRJB (95.9 FM) is a radio station licensed to serve Camden, Tennessee, United States. The station is owned by Liberty Radio. It airs a country music format. The station formerly known as Super 98 (98.3 MHz) made its first broadcast in 1976.

The station was assigned the WRJB call sign by the Federal Communications Commission.

The station rebranded to "B95" on June 14, 2023.

== On-air staff ==
Current on-air staff includes Noah "Downtown" Brown, Makisha Holland, Bobby "Flash" Melton and Pamela Mirabella, who also serves as general manager. Former on-air staff includes Ron Lane (who also served as general manager for many years), Charlie Baylor, T. M. "Michael Thomas" Bilderback, Terry "Hollywood" Hendrix, Jim Hart, Will Luther (1960s national voice talent for Pizza Hut and MasterCharge), Gary Powley, David Poehlein, "Crazy" Larry Nunnery, Dr. Mike Baloga, Marty Lange,'Daryll Lynn' Mayberry, Kyle Dewberry, Dylan Powley, Luke Crutchfield, Terry Hudson, Samuel Parker and Steve Sullivan.
