= WDVX =

Radio station in Clinton-Knoxville, Tennessee

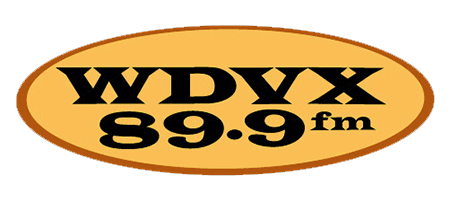
- Clinton, Tennessee; United States
- Broadcast area: Knoxville
- Frequency: 89.9 MHz
- Branding: WDVX 89.9 fm

Programming
- Format: American roots music

Ownership
- Owner: Cumberland Communities Communications Corporation

History
- First air date: 1991
- Former call signs: WJTD (1993–1993)

Technical information
- Licensing authority: FCC
- Facility ID: 14724
- Class: C3
- ERP: 200 watts
- HAAT: 598 meters
- Transmitter coordinates: 36°11′53.00″N 84°13′51.00″W
- Translators: 93.9 W230BR (Seymour); 102.9 W275AD (Knoxville)

Links
- Public license information: Public file; LMS
- Webcast: Listen Live
- Website: wdvx.com

A live performance at WDVX

WDVX is a community radio station in Knoxville, Tennessee. The station, which broadcasts via its main signal at 89.9 FM, also has translators at 93.9 and 102.9 MHz.

WDVX plays American roots music, including bluegrass, Americana, classic country, alternative country, Western swing, blues, old-time and traditional mountain music, bluegrass gospel, Celtic, and folk.

== Background ==
Incorporated in 1991, WDVX is licensed by the Federal Communications Commission (FCC) to the Cumberland Communities Communications Corporation, a not-for-profit organization whose main focus is the music, folklore and arts of the southern Appalachian mountains. It broadcasts at 200 watts from a transmitter on Cross Mountain in Campbell County, just outside Lake City, Tennessee.

WDVX was named Bluegrass Radio Station of the Year in 2003, 2005, 2007, 2008 and 2009, and its program hosts have been named Bluegrass DJ of the Year award by the Society for Preservation of Bluegrass Music in America (SPBGMA).

The listener-supported station's signal is streamed on the Web, attracting a following around the world. For example, in 2006 it was featured in the German-language America Journal.

It is one of few American radio stations to feature almost daily live musical performances. The WDVX Blue Plate Special is a lunch-time concert at the Knoxville Visitor Center on the city's main downtown shopping street. The Knoxville Tourism Alliance recognized the Blue Plate Special as the Attraction of the Year at its annual awards luncheon in 2006.

In August 2005, the Oxford American magazine, a journal of Southern U.S. culture, called WDVX "probably the best radio station in the world, well, America anyway."

== Translators ==
In addition to the main station, WDVX is relayed by two additional translators to improve its reception within its coverage area, particularly in the city of Knoxville.

Call sign	Frequency	City of license	FID	ERP (W)	Class	FCC info
W230BR	93.9 FM	Seymour, Tennessee	11058	10	D	LMS
W275AD	102.9 FM	Knoxville, Tennessee	82561	10	D	LMS

== See also ==
- List of community radio stations in the United States
