= WCPH =

Radio station in Etowah, Tennessee

- Etowah, Tennessee; United States
- Frequency: 1220 kHz
- Branding: Homegrown 1220

Programming
- Format: Oldies

Ownership
- Owner: George C. Hudson, III

History
- First air date: 1994

Technical information
- Licensing authority: FCC
- Facility ID: 63494
- Class: D
- Power: 1,000 watts day 109 watts night
- Transmitter coordinates: 35°19′15.00″N 84°30′34.00″W
- Translator: 95.5 W238CW (Etowah)

Links
- Public license information: Public file; LMS

WCPH (1220 AM, "Southeast Tennessee's Oldies Station") is a radio station broadcasting an oldies format. Licensed to Etowah, Tennessee, United States, the station is currently owned by George C. Hudson, III.
