= WJSQ =

- Athens, Tennessee; United States
- Frequency: 101.7 MHz
- Branding: Music America Loves

Programming
- Format: Country
- Affiliations: Citadel Media, Motor Racing Network

Ownership
- Owner: Randall W. Sliger

Technical information
- Licensing authority: FCC
- Facility ID: 29951
- Class: C3
- ERP: 7,500 watts
- HAAT: 161.0 meters (528.2 ft)
- Transmitter coordinates: 35°31′19.00″N 84°27′29.00″W

Links
- Public license information: Public file; LMS

WJSQ (101.7 FM, "Music America Loves") is a radio station broadcasting a country music format. Licensed to Athens, Tennessee, United States, the station is currently owned by Randall W. Sliger, and features programming from Citadel Media and Motor Racing Network.
