= WXRH =

- Rockwood, Tennessee; United States
- Frequency: 580 kHz
- Branding: 93.3 The Ranch

Programming
- Format: Classic country

Ownership
- Owner: 3B Properties; (3B Tennessee, Inc.)

History
- First air date: May 12, 1957 (as WOFE)
- Former call signs: WOFE (1957–2008); WYHM (2008–2020)
- Call sign meaning: "Ranch"

Technical information
- Licensing authority: FCC
- Facility ID: 51114
- Class: D
- Power: 5,000 watts day 49 watts night
- Transmitter coordinates: 35°49′40.00″N 84°39′19.00″W
- Translator: 93.3 W227EB (Rockwood)
- Repeater: 105.7 WIHG-HD3 (Rockwood)

Links
- Public license information: Public file; LMS

WXRH (580 AM) is a radio station licensed to Rockwood, Tennessee, United States. The station is currently owned by 3B Properties, through licensee 3B Tennessee, Inc.

On February 3, 2020, WXRH changed its format to classic country, branded as "93.3 The Ranch".
