= WLYY (AM) =

- Copperhill, Tennessee; United States
- Frequency: 1400 kHz

Programming
- Format: Defunct

Ownership
- Owner: Joy Christian Communications, Inc.

History
- First air date: December 2, 1958
- Last air date: March 6, 2017
- Former call signs: WLSB (1958–2013)

Technical information
- Facility ID: 13862
- Class: C
- Power: 1,000 watts unlimited
- Transmitter coordinates: 34°58′4.00″N 84°19′39.00″W

WLYY (1400 AM) was a radio station licensed to Copperhill, Tennessee, United States. The station was owned by Joy Christian Communications, Inc.

The station signed on December 2, 1958 as WLSB. It changed its call letters to WLYY on June 23, 2013. On March 6, 2017, Joy Christian Communications requested the cancellation of the station's license, saying that WLYY "is no longer a viable operation" following the loss of its tower site; the license was cancelled on April 26, 2017.
