= WLOD (AM) =

- Loudon, Tennessee; United States
- Frequency: 1140 kHz

Programming
- Format: Oldies
- Affiliations: CBS News; Atlanta Braves; Tennessee Radio Network; RedskinRadio.com Network

Ownership
- Owner: (Radio Loudon LLC)

History
- First air date: January 1, 1983
- Former call signs: WLNT (1983–1985)
- Call sign meaning: We LOve olDies

Technical information
- Licensing authority: FCC
- Facility ID: 38473
- Class: D
- Power: 1,000 watts daytime; 500 & 1.8 watts pre-sunrise authority
- Transmitter coordinates: 35°43′35.00″N 84°20′49.00″W
- Translator: (104.7 MHz) W284DC (Loudon)

Links
- Public license information: Public file; LMS

WLOD (1140 AM), a radio station broadcasting from Loudon, Tennessee, just southwest of Knoxville, was formerly owned by Blount Broadcasting Corporation. On October 14, 2021, at 15:30, it began operating under a local marketing agreement with Radio Loudon LLC. Radio Loudon LLC then became the licensee on March 22, 2022. At midnight, WLOD began airing Scott Shannon's True Oldies Channel on April 1, 2022.

The station first signed on the air on January 1, 1983, as WLNT. Because AM 1140 is a clear channel frequency reserved for Class A stations WRVA in Richmond and XEMR in Monterrey, Mexico, WLOD must sign-off at sunset to avoid interfering with those stations. On July 27, 2020, WLOD added FM translator W284DC at 104.7 MHz.

== Previous ownership history ==
Tellico Broadcasting Company 1/1/83-09/25/1985 Owners: James McGhee & Howard Oberholtzer Jr. Studios located at 405 Mulberry Street, Loudon TN

Loudon Broadcasters 09/25/1985-10/27/1998 Owners: Gene Chrusciel & Doyle Lowe Studios located at 405 Mulberry Street, Loudon TN

Metrowest/Horne Radio 10/27/1998-12/4/2009 Owner: Doug Horne Studios located at 317 Watt Road, Farragut TN

Blount Broadcasting 12/04/2009-3/22/2022 Owners: Jim & Johnnie Sexton Studios located at 261 Hannum Street Alcoa, TN
