= List of AM radio stations in the United States by call sign (initial letters WT–WZ) =

This is a list of AM radio stations in the United States having call signs beginning with the letters WT to WZ.

== WT-- ==
Callsign	Frequency	City of license
WTAB	1370 AM	Tabor City, North Carolina
WTAD	930 AM	Quincy, Illinois
WTAG	580 AM	Worcester, Massachusetts
WTAL	1450 AM	Tallahassee, Florida
WTAM	1100 AM	Cleveland, Ohio
WTAN	1340 AM	Clearwater, Florida
WTAQ	1360 AM	Green Bay, Wisconsin
WTAR	850 AM	Norfolk, Virginia
WTAW	1620 AM	College Station, Texas
WTAX	1240 AM	Springfield, Illinois
WTAY	1570 AM	Robinson, Illinois
WTAZ	1580 AM	Oxford, Alabama
WTBC	1230 AM	Tuscaloosa, Alabama
WTBF	970 AM	Troy, Alabama
WTBN	570 AM	Pinellas Park, Florida
WTBO	1450 AM	Cumberland, Maryland
WTBQ	1110 AM	Warwick, New York
WTCA	1050 AM	Plymouth, Indiana
WTCG	870 AM	Mount Holly, North Carolina
WTCH	960 AM	Shawano, Wisconsin
WTCJ	1230 AM	Tell City, Indiana
WTCM	580 AM	Traverse City, Michigan
WTCO	1450 AM	Campbellsville, Kentucky
WTCW	920 AM	Whitesburg, Kentucky
WTDR	1350 AM	Gadsden, Alabama
WTEL	610 AM	Philadelphia
WTEM	980 AM	Washington, D.C.
WTGM	960 AM	Salisbury, Maryland
WTHB	1550 AM	Augusta, Georgia
WTHQ	1030 AM	Point Pleasant, West Virginia
WTHU	1450 AM	Thurmont, Maryland
WTIC	1080 AM	Hartford, Connecticut
WTIF	1340 AM	Tifton, Georgia
WTIG	990 AM	Massillon, Ohio
WTIK	1310 AM	Durham, North Carolina
WTIL	1300 AM	Mayagüez, Puerto Rico
WTIM	870 AM	Assumption, Illinois
WTIQ	1490 AM	Manistique, Michigan
WTIS	1110 AM	Tampa, Florida
WTIV	1230 AM	Titusville, Pennsylvania
WTJF	1390 AM	Jackson, Tennessee
WTJV	1490 AM	DeLand, Florida
WTKA	1050 AM	Ann Arbor, Michigan
WTKE	1490 AM	Milton, Florida
WTKG	1230 AM	Grand Rapids, Michigan
WTKI	1450 AM	Huntsville, Alabama
WTKS	1290 AM	Savannah, Georgia
WTKT	1460 AM	Harrisburg, Pennsylvania
WTKY	1370 AM	Tompkinsville, Kentucky
WTKZ	1320 AM	Allentown, Pennsylvania
WTLA	1200 AM	North Syracuse, New York
WTLB	1310 AM	Utica, New York
WTLC	1310 AM	Indianapolis, Indiana
WTLK	1570 AM	Taylorsville, North Carolina
WTLM	1520 AM	Opelika, Alabama
WTLN	990 AM	Orlando, Florida
WTLO	1480 AM	Somerset, Kentucky
WTLS	1300 AM	Tallassee, Alabama
WTLT	1120 AM	Maryville, Tennessee
WTLY	1270 AM	Tallahassee, Florida
WTMA	1250 AM	Charleston, South Carolina
WTMC	1380 AM	Wilmington, Delaware
WTMJ	620 AM	Milwaukee, Wisconsin
WTMN	1430 AM	Gainesville, Florida
WTMP	1150 AM	Egypt Lake, Florida
WTMR	800 AM	Camden, New Jersey
WTMY	1280 AM	Sarasota, Florida
WTMZ	910 AM	Dorchester Terrace–Brentwood, South Carolina
WTNA	1430 AM	Altoona, Pennsylvania
WTNK	1090 AM	Hartsville, Tennessee
WTNL	1390 AM	Reidsville, Georgia
WTNS	1560 AM	Coshocton, Ohio
WTNT	730 AM	Alexandria, Virginia
WTNY	790 AM	Watertown, New York
WTOB	980 AM	Winston-Salem, North Carolina
WTOC	1360 AM	Newton, New Jersey
WTOE	1470 AM	Spruce Pine, North Carolina
WTOF	1110 AM	Bay Minette, Alabama
WTON	1240 AM	Staunton, Virginia
WTOR	770 AM	Youngstown, New York
WTOS	910 AM	Bangor, Maine
WTOT	980 AM	Marianna, Florida
WTOX	1480 AM	Glen Allen, Virginia
WTPA	980 AM	Pompano Beach, Florida
WTPR	710 AM	Paris, Tennessee
WTPS	1240 AM	Petersburg, Virginia
WTQS	1490 AM	Cameron, South Carolina
WTRB	1570 AM	Ripley, Tennessee
WTRC	1340 AM	Elkhart, Indiana
WTRE	1330 AM	Greensburg, Indiana
WTRI	1520 AM	Brunswick, Maryland
WTRN	1340 AM	Tyrone, Pennsylvania
WTRO	1450 AM	Dyersburg, Tennessee
WTRP	620 AM	La Grange, Georgia
WTRU	830 AM	Kernersville, North Carolina
WTRX	1330 AM	Flint, Michigan
WTSA	1450 AM	Brattleboro, Vermont
WTSB	1090 AM	Selma, North Carolina
WTSK	790 AM	Tuscaloosa, Alabama
WTSL	1400 AM	Hanover, New Hampshire
WTSN	1270 AM	Dover, New Hampshire
WTSO	1070 AM	Madison, Wisconsin
WTSV	1230 AM	Claremont, New Hampshire
WTTB	1490 AM	Vero Beach, Florida
WTTF	1600 AM	Tiffin, Ohio
WTTI	1530 AM	Dalton, Georgia
WTTL	1310 AM	Madisonville, Kentucky
WTTM	1680 AM	Lindenwold, New Jersey
WTTR	1470 AM	Westminster, Maryland
WTUP	1490 AM	Tupelo, Mississippi
WTVB	1590 AM	Coldwater, Michigan
WTVN	610 AM	Columbus, Ohio
WTWA	1240 AM	Thomson, Georgia
WTWB	1570 AM	Auburndale, Florida
WTWD	910 AM	Plant City, Florida
WTWG	1050 AM	Columbus, Mississippi
WTWN	1100 AM	Wells River, Vermont
WTWZ	1120 AM	Clinton, Mississippi
WTXK	1210 AM	Pike Road, Alabama
WTXW	1550 AM	Towanda, Pennsylvania
WTXY	1540 AM	Whiteville, North Carolina
WTYL	1290 AM	Tylertown, Mississippi
WTYS	1340 AM	Marianna, Florida
WTZE	1470 AM	Tazewell, Virginia
WTZN	1310 AM	Troy, Pennsylvania
WTZQ	1600 AM	Hendersonville, North Carolina
WTZX	860 AM	Sparta, Tennessee

== WU-- ==
Callsign	Frequency	City of license
WUAT	1110 AM	Pikeville, Tennessee
WUBG	1570 AM	Methuen, Massachusetts
WUBR	910 AM	Baton Rouge, Louisiana
WUCO	1550 AM	Morganfield, Kentucky
WUCT	1600 AM	Algood, Tennessee
WUFE	1260 AM	Baxley, Georgia
WUFF	710 AM	Eastman, Georgia
WUFO	1080 AM	Amherst, New York
WUKQ	1420 AM	Ponce, Puerto Rico
WUKZ	1010 AM	Marion, Virginia
WULM	1600 AM	Springfield, Ohio
WULR	980 AM	York, South Carolina
WULT	1450 AM	Highland Springs, Virginia
WUMP	730 AM	Madison, Alabama
WUMY	830 AM	Memphis, Tennessee
WUNA	1480 AM	Ocoee, Florida
WUNN	1110 AM	Mason, Michigan
WUNO	630 AM	San Juan, Puerto Rico
WUNR	1600 AM	Brookline, Massachusetts
WUPE	1110 AM	Pittsfield, Massachusetts
WUPR	1530 AM	Utuado, Puerto Rico
WURA	920 AM	Quantico, Virginia
WURD	900 AM	Philadelphia
WURL	760 AM	Moody, Alabama
WURN	1040 AM	Miami, Florida
WUSP	1550 AM	Utica, New York
WUST	1120 AM	Washington, D.C.
WUSW	1270 AM	Niagara Falls, New York
WUVR	1490 AM	Lebanon, New Hampshire
WUXL	1400 AM	Macon, Georgia
WUZZ	1200 AM	New Castle, Pennsylvania

== WV-- ==
Callsign	Frequency	City of license
WVAL	800 AM	Sauk Rapids, Minnesota
WVAM	1450 AM	Parkersburg, West Virginia
WVAR	600 AM	Richwood, West Virginia
WVAX	1450 AM	Charlottesville, Virginia
WVBF	1530 AM	Middleborough Center, Massachusetts
WVBG	1490 AM	Vicksburg, Mississippi
WVBS	1470 AM	Burgaw, North Carolina
WVCD	790 AM	Bamberg–Denmark, South Carolina
WVCV	1340 AM	Orange, Virginia
WVCY	690 AM	Oshkosh, Wisconsin
WVEI	1440 AM	Worcester, Massachusetts
WVEL	1140 AM	Pekin, Illinois
WVFN	730 AM	East Lansing, Michigan
WVGB	1490 AM	Beaufort, South Carolina
WVGC	1400 AM	Elberton, Georgia
WVGG	1440 AM	Lucedale, Mississippi
WVGM	1320 AM	Lynchburg, Virginia
WVHF	1140 AM	Kentwood, Michigan
WVHU	800 AM	Huntington, West Virginia
WVJP	1110 AM	Caguas, Puerto Rico
WVJS	1420 AM	Owensboro, Kentucky
WVLD	1450 AM	Valdosta, Georgia
WVLG	640 AM	Wildwood, Florida
WVLK	590 AM	Lexington, Kentucky
WVLN	740 AM	Olney, Illinois
WVLT	1270 AM	Vineland, New Jersey
WVLY	1370 AM	Moundsville, West Virginia
WVMR	1370 AM	Frost, West Virginia
WVMT	620 AM	Burlington, Vermont
WVNA	1590 AM	Tuscumbia, Alabama
WVNE	760 AM	Leicester, Massachusetts
WVNJ	1160 AM	Oakland, New Jersey
WVNN	770 AM	Athens, Alabama
WVNT	1230 AM	Parkersburg, West Virginia
WVNZ	1450 AM	Highland Springs, Virginia
WVOC	560 AM	Columbia, South Carolina
WVOE	1590 AM	Chadbourn, North Carolina
WVOG	600 AM	New Orleans, Louisiana
WVOJ	1570 AM	Fernandina Beach, Florida
WVOL	1470 AM	Berry Hill, Tennessee
WVON	1690 AM	Berwyn, Illinois
WVOP	970 AM	Vidalia, Georgia
WVOS	1240 AM	Liberty, New York
WVOT	1420 AM	Wilson, North Carolina
WVOW	1290 AM	Logan, West Virginia
WVOX	1460 AM	New Rochelle, New York
WVOZ	1580 AM	Aguadilla, Puerto Rico
WVRC	1400 AM	Spencer, West Virginia
WVRQ	1360 AM	Viroqua, Wisconsin
WVSA	1380 AM	Vernon, Alabama
WVSG	820 AM	Columbus, Ohio
WVSL	1240 AM	Saranac Lake, New York
WVSM	1500 AM	Rainsville, Alabama
WVTJ	610 AM	Pensacola, Florida
WVTL	1570 AM	Amsterdam, New York
WVTS	1240 AM	Dunbar, West Virginia
WVUS	1190 AM	Grafton, West Virginia
WVVB	1410 AM	Kingston, Tennessee
WVVO	1140 AM	Orlando, Florida
WVWI	1000 AM	Charlotte Amalie, United States Virgin Islands
WVXX	1050 AM	Norfolk, Virginia
WVZN	1580 AM	Columbia, Pennsylvania

== WW-- ==
Callsign	Frequency	City of license
WWAB	1330 AM	Lakeland, Florida
WWAC	1020 AM	Ocean City/Somers Point, New Jersey
WWBA	820 AM	Largo, Florida
WWBC	1510 AM	Cocoa, Florida
WWBF	1130 AM	Bartow, Florida
WWBG	1470 AM	Greensboro, North Carolina
WWCA	1270 AM	Gary, Indiana
WWCB	1370 AM	Corry, Pennsylvania
WWCD	1070 AM	Solana, Florida
WWCH	1300 AM	Clarion, Pennsylvania
WWCK	1570 AM	Flint, Michigan
WWCL	1440 AM	Lehigh Acres, Florida
WWCO	1240 AM	Waterbury, Connecticut
WWCS	540 AM	Canonsburg, Pennsylvania
WWDB	860 AM	Philadelphia
WWDJ	1150 AM	Boston, Massachusetts
WWDN	1580 AM	Danville, Virginia
WWDR	1080 AM	Murfreesboro, North Carolina
WWDX	1530 AM	Huntingdon, Tennessee
WWFE	670 AM	Miami, Florida
WWFL	1340 AM	Clermont, Florida
WWGB	1030 AM	Indian Head, Maryland
WWGC	1090 AM	Albertville, Alabama
WWGP	1050 AM	Sanford, North Carolina
WWHK	1450 AM	Myrtle Beach, South Carolina
WWHM	1290 AM	Sumter, South Carolina
WWHN	1510 AM	Joliet, Illinois
WWIC	1050 AM	Scottsboro, Alabama
WWIN	1400 AM	Baltimore, Maryland
WWIS	1260 AM	Black River Falls, Wisconsin
WWJ	950 AM	Detroit, Michigan
WWJB	1450 AM	Brooksville, Florida
WWJZ	640 AM	Mount Holly, New Jersey
WWKB	1520 AM	Buffalo, New York
WWKU	1450 AM	Plum Springs, Kentucky
WWKY	990 AM	Winchester, Kentucky
WWL	870 AM	New Orleans, Louisiana
WWLE	1170 AM	Cornwall, New York
WWLX	590 AM	Loretto, Tennessee
WWMC	1010 AM	Kinston, North Carolina
WWMI	1380 AM	St. Petersburg, Florida
WWMN	1110 AM	Petoskey, Michigan
WWNA	1340 AM	Aguadilla, Puerto Rico
WWNB	1490 AM	New Bern, North Carolina
WWNC	570 AM	Asheville, North Carolina
WWNL	1080 AM	Pittsburgh, Pennsylvania
WWNN	1470 AM	Pompano Beach, Florida
WWNR	620 AM	Beckley, West Virginia
WWNS	1240 AM	Statesboro, Georgia
WWNT	1380 AM	Winston-Salem, North Carolina
WWOL	780 AM	Forest City, North Carolina
WWON	930 AM	Waynesboro, Tennessee
WWOS	810 AM	Walterboro, South Carolina
WWOW	1360 AM	Conneaut, Ohio
WWPA	1340 AM	Williamsport, Pennsylvania
WWPR	1490 AM	Bradenton, Florida
WWQT	1160 AM	Tryon, North Carolina
WWRC	570 AM	Bethesda, Maryland
WWRF	1380 AM	Lake Worth, Florida
WWRI	1450 AM	West Warwick, Rhode Island
WWRK	970 AM	Florence, South Carolina
WWRL	1600 AM	New York City
WWRU	1660 AM	Jersey City, New Jersey
WWRV	1330 AM	New York City
WWSC	1450 AM	Glens Falls, New York
WWSF	1220 AM	Sanford, Maine
WWSJ	1580 AM	St. Johns, Michigan
WWSZ	1420 AM	Decatur, Georgia
WWTB	980 AM	Bristol, Virginia
WWTC	1280 AM	Minneapolis, Minnesota
WWTF	1580 AM	Georgetown, Kentucky
WWTK	730 AM	Lake Placid, Florida
WWTM	1400 AM	Decatur, Alabama
WWTR	1170 AM	Bridgewater, New Jersey
WWTX	1290 AM	Wilmington, Delaware
WWVA	1170 AM	Wheeling, West Virginia
WWVT	1260 AM	Christiansburg, Virginia
WWWC	1240 AM	Wilkesboro, North Carolina
WWWE	1310 AM	Decatur, Georgia
WWWI	1270 AM	Baxter, Minnesota
WWWL	1350 AM	New Orleans, Louisiana
WWWS	1400 AM	Buffalo, New York
WWXL	1450 AM	Manchester, Kentucky
WWYC	1560 AM	Toledo, Ohio
WWYO	970 AM	Pineville, West Virginia
WWZQ	1240 AM	Aberdeen, Mississippi

== WX-- ==
Callsign	Frequency	City of license
WXAG	1470 AM	Athens, Georgia
WXAL	1400 AM	Demopolis, Alabama
WXBN	880 AM	Sweetwater, Florida
WXCF	1230 AM	Clifton Forge, Virginia
WXCO	1230 AM	Wausau, Wisconsin
WXCT	1370 AM	Chattanooga, Tennessee
WXEM	1460 AM	Buford, Georgia
WXES	1110 AM	Chicago, Illinois
WXEW	840 AM	Yabucoa, Puerto Rico
WXGI	950 AM	Richmond, Virginia
WXGM	1420 AM	Gloucester, Virginia
WXGO	1270 AM	Madison, Indiana
WXGT	1580 AM	Columbus, Ohio
WXIC	660 AM	Waverly, Ohio
WXIT	1200 AM	Blowing Rock, North Carolina
WXJC	850 AM	Birmingham, Alabama
WXJO	1120 AM	Douglasville, Georgia
WXKD	930 AM	Monroeville, Alabama
WXKG	1010 AM	Atlanta
WXKL	1290 AM	Sanford, North Carolina
WXKO	1150 AM	Fort Valley, Georgia
WXKS	1200 AM	Newton, Massachusetts
WXLA	1180 AM	Dimondale, Michigan
WXLI	1230 AM	Dublin, Georgia
WXLM	980 AM	Groton, Connecticut
WXLW	950 AM	Indianapolis, Indiana
WXMC	1310 AM	Parsippany-Troy Hills, New Jersey
WXME	780 AM	Monticello, Maine
WXNC	1060 AM	Monroe, North Carolina
WXNK	940 AM	Shell Lake, Wisconsin
WXNT	1430 AM	Indianapolis, Indiana
WXOK	1460 AM	Port Allen, Louisiana
WXQW	660 AM	Fairhope, Alabama
WXRF	1590 AM	Guayama, Puerto Rico
WXRH	580 AM	Rockwood, Tennessee
WXRL	1300 AM	Lancaster, New York
WXRQ	1460 AM	Mount Pleasant, Tennessee
WXRS	1590 AM	Swainsboro, Georgia
WXSM	640 AM	Blountville, Tennessee
WXTG	1490 AM	Hampton, Virginia
WXTN	1000 AM	Benton, Mississippi
WXVA	610 AM	Winchester, Virginia
WXVE	1570 AM	Latrobe, Pennsylvania
WXVI	1600 AM	Montgomery, Alabama
WXVW	1450 AM	Jeffersonville, Indiana
WXXI	1370 AM	Rochester, New York
WXYB	1520 AM	Indian Rocks Beach, Florida
WXYG	540 AM	Sauk Rapids, Minnesota
WXYT	1270 AM	Detroit, Michigan

== WY-- ==
Callsign	Frequency	City of license
WYAC	930 AM	Cabo Rojo, Puerto Rico
WYAL	1280 AM	Scotland Neck, North Carolina
WYAM	890 AM	Hartselle, Alabama
WYBC	1340 AM	New Haven, Connecticut
WYBT	1000 AM	Blountstown, Florida
WYBY	920 AM	Cortland, New York
WYCB	1340 AM	Washington, D.C.
WYCK	1340 AM	Plains, Pennsylvania
WYCV	900 AM	Granite Falls, North Carolina
WYCZ	1030 AM	White Bluff, Tennessee
WYDE	1260 AM	Birmingham, Alabama
WYDU	1160 AM	Red Springs, North Carolina
WYEA	1290 AM	Sylacauga, Alabama
WYEL	600 AM	Mayagüez, Puerto Rico
WYFN	980 AM	Nashville, Tennessee
WYFQ	930 AM	Charlotte, North Carolina
WYGH	1440 AM	Paris, Kentucky
WYGI	1430 AM	Madison, Tennessee
WYGM	740 AM	Orlando, Florida
WYGR	1530 AM	Wyoming, Michigan
WYHL	1450 AM	Meridian, Mississippi
WYIS	1410 AM	McRae, Georgia
WYJV	710 AM	Smyrna, Tennessee
WYKG	1430 AM	Covington, Georgia
WYKM	1250 AM	Rupert, West Virginia
WYKO	880 AM	Sabana Grande, Puerto Rico
WYLD	940 AM	New Orleans, Louisiana
WYLF	850 AM	Penn Yan, New York
WYLL	1160 AM	Chicago
WYLS	670 AM	York, Alabama
WYMB	920 AM	Manning, South Carolina
WYMC	1430 AM	Mayfield, Kentucky
WYMM	1530 AM	Jacksonville, Florida
WYMW	1110 AM	Hurricane, West Virginia
WYNC	1540 AM	Yanceyville, North Carolina
WYND	1310 AM	DeLand, Florida
WYNF	1340 AM	Augusta, Georgia
WYNN	540 AM	Florence, South Carolina
WYNY	1450 AM	Milford, Pennsylvania
WYOH	1540 AM	Niles, Ohio
WYPC	1330 AM	Wellston, Ohio
WYPZ	900 AM	Macon, Georgia
WYRD	1330 AM	Greenville, South Carolina
WYRE	810 AM	Annapolis, Maryland
WYRN	1480 AM	Louisburg, North Carolina
WYRV	770 AM	Cedar Bluff, Virginia
WYSH	1380 AM	Clinton, Tennessee
WYSL	1040 AM	Avon, New York
WYSR	1590 AM	High Point, North Carolina
WYTH	1250 AM	Madison, Georgia
WYTI	1570 AM	Rocky Mount, Virginia
WYTS	1230 AM	Columbus, Ohio
WYUP	1400 AM	Loretto, Pennsylvania
WYVE	1280 AM	Wytheville, Virginia
WYWO	1570 AM	Warren, Ohio
WYWY	950 AM	Barbourville, Kentucky
WYXE	1130 AM	Gallatin, Tennessee
WYXI	1390 AM	Athens, Tennessee
WYYC	1250 AM	York, Pennsylvania
WYYZ	1490 AM	Jasper, Georgia
WYZD	1560 AM	Dobson, North Carolina
WYZE	1480 AM	Atlanta
WYZI	810 AM	Royston, Georgia

== WZ-- ==
Callsign	Frequency	City of license
WZAM	970 AM	Ishpeming, Michigan
WZAN	970 AM	Portland, Maine
WZAP	690 AM	Bristol, Virginia
WZAZ	1400 AM	Jacksonville, Florida
WZBK	1220 AM	Keene, New Hampshire
WZBO	1260 AM	Edenton, North Carolina
WZBR	1410 AM	Dedham, Massachusetts
WZBU	1520 AM	New Holstein, Wisconsin
WZCC	1240 AM	Cross City, Florida
WZEP	1460 AM	DeFuniak Springs, Florida
WZFG	1100 AM	Dilworth, Minnesota
WZGM	1350 AM	Black Mountain, North Carolina
WZGV	730 AM	Cramerton, North Carolina
WZGX	1450 AM	Bessemer, Alabama
WZHF	1390 AM	Capitol Heights, Maryland
WZHR	1400 AM	Zephyrhills, Florida
WZJY	1480 AM	Mount Pleasant, South Carolina
WZKD	950 AM	Montgomery, Alabama
WZKO	1350 AM	Fort Myers, Florida
WZKY	1580 AM	Albemarle, North Carolina
WZKZ	1450 AM	Bridgeport, Connecticut
WZMG	910 AM	Pepperell, Alabama
WZNG	1400 AM	Shelbyville, Tennessee
WZNZ	1600 AM	Atlantic Beach, Florida
WZOB	1250 AM	Fort Payne, Alabama
WZOE	1490 AM	Princeton, Illinois
WZON	620 AM	Bangor, Maine
WZOO	700 AM	Asheboro, North Carolina
WZOT	1220 AM	Rockmart, Georgia
WZOX	1660 AM	Kalamazoo, Michigan
WZQK	1240 AM	Flowood, Mississippi
WZQZ	1180 AM	Trion, Georgia
WZRC	1480 AM	New York City
WZRK	810 AM	Dodgeville, Wisconsin
WZST	920 AM	Fairmont, West Virginia
WZTA	1370 AM	Vero Beach, Florida
WZTE	1530 AM	Union City, Pennsylvania
WZUM	1550 AM	Braddock, Pennsylvania
WZUN	1070 AM	Sandy Creek–Pulaski, New York
WZWB	1420 AM	Kenova, West Virginia
WZXI	1280 AM	Lancaster, Kentucky
WZYN	810 AM	Hahira, Georgia
WZYX	1440 AM	Cowan, Tennessee
WZZA	1410 AM	Tuscumbia, Alabama
WZZB	1390 AM	Seymour, Indiana
WZZQ	1500 AM	Gaffney, South Carolina
WZZW	1600 AM	Milton, West Virginia

== See also ==
- North American call sign
