= Crimson Tide Sports Network =

Collegiate radio sports network

Crimson Tide Sports Network (CTSN)
- Type: Radio network Television network
- Country: United States
- Headquarters: Tuscaloosa, Alabama
- Broadcast area: Alabama; Southeastern U.S. (limited)
- Owner: Learfield
- Affiliation: Alabama Crimson Tide
- Affiliates: 61, including 2 flagships
- Official website: Official website

The Crimson Tide Sports Network (sometimes stylized as CTSN) is the radio and television network of the University of Alabama Crimson Tide men's and women's sports teams. Headquartered in Tuscaloosa, Alabama, the network airs programming on local stations throughout the Southeast as well as digitally through the Varsity Network and social media channels.

CTSN is operated by Crimson Tide Sports Marketing through a partnership between the University of Alabama and Learfield.

== Programming ==
=== Radio ===
- The Kalen DeBoer Show
- Hey Coach
- Crimson Tide Rewind

=== Television ===
- The Kalen DeBoer TV Show
- The Nate Oats Show
- TideTV This Week

=== Social media ===
- Crimson Drive

== Talent ==
Football

- Chris Stewart – play-by-play
- Tyler Watts – color analyst

Basketball

- Chris Stewart – play-by-play

Baseball

- Chris Stewart – play-by-play

== Over the air television stations ==
Market	Station	Affiliation	Notes
Birmingham-Tuscaloosa-Anniston	WIAT-DT	CBS	TV Flagship of CTSN
Tuscaloosa	WVUA-CA	This TV / Independent	Owned by the University of Alabama (Board of Trustees); WVUA is a low-powered translator of WUOA.
Tuscaloosa	WVUA-DT	This TV / Independent	Owned by the University of Alabama (Board of Trustees); WVUA is a low-powered translator of WUOA.
Demopolis	WJMY-LD	This TV / Independent	Low-powered translator of WUOA-DT and WVUA-CA Tuscaloosa
Montgomery-Selma	WNCF-DT	ABC	
Montgomery-Selma	WBMM-DT2	ABC	Simulcast of WNCF
Huntsville/Decatur	WZDX-DT 54	FOX	Also serves southern Middle Tennessee, including Lawrenceburg, Pulaski, Fayetteville and Winchester.

== Regional cable networks ==
Network	Area Served
Comcast/Charter Sports Southeast	Alabama, Arkansas, Florida, Georgia, Kentucky, Louisiana, Mississippi, North Carolina, South Carolina, Tennessee, Texas, Virginia, West Virginia
Cox Sports TV	Louisiana and Mississippi

== Station list ==
Network stations as of the 2021 Crimson Tide season
Callsign	Frequency	Band	City	State	Network status
WBPT	106.9	FM	Birmingham	Alabama	Flagship
WFFN	95.3	FM	Tuscaloosa	Alabama	Flagship
WUCT	1600	AM	Algood-Cookeville	Tennessee	Football only
WHMA-FM	95.5	FM	Anniston	Alabama	Affiliate
WAFN-FM	92.7	FM	Arab-Guntersville	Alabama	Affiliate
WCKF	100.7	FM	Ashland	Alabama	Affiliate
WBIN	640	AM	Atlanta	Georgia	Affiliate
WBBK-FM	93.1	FM	Blakely-Dothan	Alabama	Affiliate
W227DD	93.3	FM	Brent	Alabama	n/a (WTSK relay)
WENN	1320	AM	Birmingham	Alabama	Affiliate
W261BX	100.1	FM	Birmingham	Alabama	n/a (WENN relay)
WKNU	106.3	FM	Brewton	Alabama	Affiliate
WEIS	990	AM	Centre	Alabama	Affiliate
W263BW	100.5	FM	Centre	Alabama	n/a (WEIS relay)
WKOM	101.7	FM	Columbia	Tennessee	Affiliate
W231DG	94.1	FM	Cookeville	Tennessee	n/a (WUCT relay)
WADI	95.3	FM	Corinth	Mississippi	Affiliate
WZYX	1440	AM	Cowan	Tennessee	Affiliate
W233BN	94.5	FM	Cowan	Tennessee	n/a (WZYX relay)
W237DT	95.3	FM	Cowan	Tennessee	n/a (WZYX relay)
WFMH	1340	AM	Cullman	Alabama	Affiliate
WWTM	1400	AM	Decatur	Alabama	Affiliate
W232DL	94.3	FM	Decatur	Alabama	n/a (WWTM relay)
WARB	700	AM	Dothan	Alabama	Affiliate
W290DG	105.9	FM	Dothan	Alabama	n/a (WARB relay)
W234DI	95.3	FM	Douglas	Alabama	n/a (WCRL relay)
WLDX	990	AM	Fayette	Alabama	Affiliate
W246DJ	97.1	FM	Fayette	Alabama	n/a (WLDX relay)
WYTK	93.9	FM	Florence-Muscle Shoals	Alabama	Affiliate
WTKE-FM	98.1	FM	Fort Walton Beach	Florida	Football only
WFPA	1400	AM	Fort Payne	Alabama	Affiliate
W230CX	93.9	FM	Fort Payne	Alabama	n/a (WFPA relay)
WAAX	570	AM	Gadsden	Alabama	Affiliate
W270DQ	101.9	FM	Gadsden	Alabama	n/a (WAAX relay)
WFXX	107.7	FM	Georgiana-Greenville	Alabama	Affiliate
WSHF	92.7	FM	Haleyville	Alabama	Affiliate
WTNK	1090	AM	Hartsville	Tennessee	Affiliate
W228CB	93.5	FM	Hartsville	Tennessee	n/a (WTNK relay)
W247AT	97.3	FM	Harvest	Alabama	n/a (WWTM relay)
WFOR	1400	AM	Hattiesburg	Mississippi	Affiliate
W224DP	92.7	FM	Hattiesburg	Mississippi	n/a (WFOR relay)
KKEA	1420	AM	Honolulu	Hawaii	Affiliate
K224FR	92.7	FM	Honolulu	Hawaii	n/a (KKEA relay)
WZZN	97.7	FM	Huntsville	Alabama	Affiliate
WHOD	94.5	FM	Jackson	Alabama	Affiliate
WJQS	1400	AM	Jackson	Mississippi	Football only
W292EX	106.3	FM	Jackson	Mississippi	n/a (WJQS relay)
WJLX	1240	AM	Jasper	Alabama	Affiliate
W268BM	101.5	FM	Jasper	Alabama	n/a (WJLX relay)
WINL	98.5	FM	Linden	Alabama	Affiliate
W257AZ	99.3	FM	Lookout Mountain	Tennessee	n/a (WUUQ relay)
WALT-FM	102.1	FM	Meridian	Mississippi	Football only
WMOG	910	AM	Meridian	Mississippi	Affiliate
W240DY	95.9	FM	Meridian	Mississippi	n/a (WMOG relay)
WNSP	105.5	FM	Mobile	Alabama	Affiliate
WZEW	92.1	FM	Mobile	Alabama	Affiliate
WMFC	99.3	FM	Monroeville	Alabama	Affiliate
WLWI	1440	AM	Montgomery	Alabama	Affiliate
WXFX	95.1	FM	Montgomery	Alabama	Affiliate
WXFX-HD3*	95.1-3	FM	Montgomery	Alabama	n/a (WLWI relay)
WPRT-FM	102.5	FM	Nashville-Pegram-Murfreesboro	Tennessee	Football only
WBUZ-HD2*	102.9-2	FM	Nashville	Tennessee	n/a (WPRT-FM relay)
WZMG	910	AM	Opelika-Pepperell-Auburn	Alabama	Affiliate
WAMI-FM	102.3	FM	Opp	Alabama	Affiliate
WBPC	95.1	FM	Panama City	Florida	Football only
WPNN	790	AM	Pensacola	Florida	Affiliate
W279CY	103.7	FM	Pensacola	Florida	n/a (WPNN relay)
WURV-HD2*	103.7	FM	Richmond	Virginia	Affiliate
W291CL	106.1	FM	Richmond	Virginia	n/a (WURV-HD2 relay)
WLAQ	1410	AM	Rome	Georgia	Affiliate
W245DG	96.9	FM	Rome	Georgia	n/a (WLAQ relay)
WGOL	920	AM	Russellville	Alabama	Affiliate
W264BN	100.7	FM	Russellville	Alabama	n/a (WGOL relay)
WWIC	1050	AM	Scottsboro	Alabama	Affiliate
WDXX	100.1	FM	Selma	Alabama	Affiliate
WUUQ	97.3	FM	South Pittsburg-Chattanooga	Tennessee	Football only
WASC	1530	AM	Spartanburg	South Carolina	Football only
KXEN	1010	AM	St. Louis	Missouri	Affiliate
K283CI	104.5	FM	St. Louis	Missouri	n/a (KXEN relay)
WFEB	1340	AM	Sylacauga	Alabama	Affiliate
W265DV	100.9	FM	Sylacauga	Alabama	n/a (WFEB relay)
WTLS	1300	AM	Tallassee	Alabama	Affiliate
W293BK	106.5	FM	Tallassee	Alabama	n/a (WTLS relay)
WZLQ	98.5	FM	Tupelo	Mississippi	Football only
WTBC	1230	AM	Tuscaloosa	Alabama	Affiliate
W261BT	100.1	FM	Tuscaloosa	Alabama	n/a (WTBC relay)
WTSK	790	AM	Tuscaloosa	Alabama	Affiliate
WIOL-FM	95.7	FM	Waverly Hall-Columbus	Georgia	Football only
WJEC	106.5	FM	Vernon	Alabama	Affiliate
WPCH	1310	AM	West Point	Georgia	Affiliate
WKXM-FM	97.7	FM	Winfield	Alabama	Affiliate

- Asterisk (*) indicates HD Radio broadcast.
- Gray background indicates low-power FM translator.

== Satellite radio ==
In a partnership with CTSN, SiriusXM simulcasts all Alabama football games and various other sports on their regional play-by-play channels: 190, 191 and 192.
