= Vol Network =

Collegiate sports radio network

- Type: Radio network Television network
- Branding: Vol Network (general); Lady Vol Network (women’s basketball)
- Country: United States
- Headquarters: Knoxville, Tennessee
- Broadcast area: Tennessee (statewide) northern Alabama eastern Arkansas northern Georgia southwestern and southcentral Kentucky far northern Mississippi (limited) western North Carolina southwestern Virginia
- Owner: IMG College; University of Tennessee (UTK Sports & Campus Marketing)
- Parent: Learfield
- Established: 1949 (as a radio network)
- Affiliations: Tennessee Volunteers; Tennessee Lady Volunteers
- Affiliates: 44 (Radio); 7 (Television)
- Official website: utsports.com/sports/2017/6/15/volnetwork.aspx

The Vol Network is the radio and television network of the University of Tennessee Volunteers men's and women's sports teams known as the Vols and Lady Vols. The network was established in 1949, and since 2019, it has been operated by Learfield IMG College.

It consists of two regional sports networks, about 67 radio stations (both AM and FM), as well as eight television stations across Tennessee, also serving varied portions of neighboring states, depending on the station and market.

Some of the Tennessee Vols’ pre-season exhibition and early season basketball games are also streamed via UTSports.com

== History ==
The first Tennessee Volunteers football game radio broadcast was produced by the Vol Radio Network in 1949. The name of the radio network was given by the legendary Robert R. Neyland, with Lindsey Nelson serving as the first-ever play-by-play announcer.

Men's basketball games were added to the Vol Network's portfolio in the early 1950s. The Vol Network began broadcasting Tennessee Lady Vols basketball games in the 1977–78 season. When the Vol Network airs the women's basketball broadcasts, it is identified as the Lady Vol Network. It is claimed to be the largest women's college basketball radio network in the country.

Host Communications managed media rights to University of Tennessee athletics, and operated the Vol Network from 1989 until November 2007, when Host Communications merged with IMG College, a division of IMG.

=== On-air personalities ===
- Mike Keith, Director of programming and Play-by-play announcer (Football and Basketball; 2025–present)
- Jayson Swain, Booth Color Analyst (football, began 2026)
- John Wilkerson, Vol Baseball Play-by-Play (1999-present) and Studio Host (football and basketball)
- Brian Rice, Lady Vol Basketball Play-by-Play (2022-present) Lady Vol Softball (former play-by-play)
- Chris Lofton, Color Analyst (basketball 2025–present)
- Steve Hamer Color Analyst (basketball 2025-present)
- Brent Hubbs, Football sideline reporter and program host (1994-present)

=== Notable personalities ===
- John Ward, the “Voice of the Vols” (1968–1999 football; 1965–1999 basketball), famous for the phrase, “It’s Football Time in Tennessee,” and his touchdown call, ”Give him six!”
- Bill Anderson, former football color analyst and broadcasting partner of Ward
- Lindsey Nelson, first broadcaster on Vol Network (1948–1951)
- Tim Priest, Color analyst (football, 1999-2021)
- Bert Bertelkamp, Color Analyst (basketball 1999-2025)
- Mickey Dearstone - Play-by-play commentator (Women's Basketball, 1998–present)
- Pat Ryan, Color Analyst (football, 2022-2025)

== Programming ==
=== Current television programming ===
- The Rick Barnes Show (2015–present) - men's basketball coach's show

=== Recent former television programming ===
- The Pat Summitt Show (1974–2012) - women's basketball coach's show
- The Holly Warlick Show (2012–2019) - women's basketball coach's show
- The Bruce Pearl Show (2005–2011) - men's basketball coach's show; revived onto the Auburn IMG Sports TV Network in 2015
- The Cuonzo Martin Show (2011–2014) - men's basketball coach's show
- The Donnie Tyndall Show (2014–2015) - men's basketball coach's show
- The Phillip Fulmer Show (1992–2008) - football coach's show
- The Derek Dooley Show (2010–2012) - football coach's show
- The Butch Jones Show (2013–2017) - football coach's show

=== Radio programming ===
- Big Orange Hotline - Monday evenings during football season (Knoxville, Tri-Cities, Nashville, and Chattanooga area affiliates only)
- Vol Calls - Monday Nights 8:00-9:00 PM ET (7:00-8:00 PM CT)
- The Rick Barnes Show - men's basketball coach's show (radio version)
- Tennessee Tip-off Show - men's basketball pre-game show

== Television affiliates ==
City of license (Market)	Station	Channel	Primary affiliation	Notes
Chattanooga	WTVC	9.1	ABC	
Jackson (TN)	WJKT	16.1	Fox	
Jackson (TN)	EPlusTV6	6 (cable only)	Independent	The Holly Warlick Show only
Johnson City (Kingsport/Bristol, TN-VA)	WJHL-TV	11.1	CBS	
Johnson City (Kingsport/Bristol, TN-VA)	WJHL-TV	11.2	ABC	
Knoxville	WVLT-TV	8.1	CBS	Flagship station of the Vol Network's TV programming
Knoxville	WVLT-TV	8.2	MyNetworkTV	Flagship station of the Vol Network's TV programming
Memphis	WATN-TV	24.1	ABC	
Memphis	WLMT	30.1	The CW	Replays of Vol Network TV shows from WATN
Nashville	WZTV	17.1	Fox	Also serves the Bowling Green, Kentucky area by default
Nashville	WUXP	30.1	MyNetworkTV	Also serves the Bowling Green, Kentucky area by default

=== Regional Sports Networks ===
Callsign/Station Name	Service Area	Notes
FanDuel Sports Network Southeast (formerly SportSouth and Fox Sports Southeast)	Tennessee, Mississippi, Alabama, Georgia, South Carolina, southeast North Carolina	Also available nationwide via Dish Network and DirecTV

=== Former TV affiliates ===
Callsign/Station Name	Service Area	Notes
Comcast/Charter Sports Southeast	Alabama, Arkansas, Florida, Georgia, Kentucky, Louisiana, Mississippi, North Carolina, South Carolina, Tennessee, Texas, Virginia, West Virginia	Defunct as of June 1, 2014
WMYA	Spartanburg, SC-Asheville, NC	Licensed to Anderson, SC; Disaffiliated as of 2013
WMC-TV	Memphis, Tennessee	Disaffiliated in 2013, coach's TV shows moved to WATN and WLMT
WPXX-TV	Memphis, Tennessee	Disaffiliated in 2008; secondary TV affiliate
WKPT-TV	Tri-Cities	Disaffiliated in 2013; replaced by WJHL
WAPK-CD/WKPT-DT2	Tri-Cities	Disaffiliated in 2013; replaced by WJHL

== Radio affiliates ==
=== Current affiliates ===
Tennessee Volunteers games played at night used to be heard across 28 states in the eastern half of the United States and three provinces in eastern Canada thanks to a previous affiliation deal with Nashville's 50,000 watt clear-channel station WLAC. This ended in 2010 when that station lost the Vol Network affiliation to WGFX.

All affiliates broadcast men's and women's basketball as well as UT football unless otherwise stated in the notes column. Fans out of range of all stations can also listen to the game broadcasts via the TuneIn and UT GameDay app or via the University of Tennessee sports website.

==== Tennessee ====
City (Station location in parentheses if not city of license)	Callsign	Frequency/Band	Notes
Knoxville	WNML	990 AM	Flagship station of the network
Knoxville	WNML	99.1 FM	Full-time repeater of flagship station WNML-AM 990
Knoxville	WIVK	107.7 FM	Football and Men's Basketball only
Baxter (Cookeville)	WBXE	93.7 FM	
Bolivar	WMOD	96.7 FM	Football and women's basketball
Bristol (Kingsport/Johnson City, Tennessee/Bristol, Virginia)	WOPI	1490 AM	
Brownsville	WTBG	95.3 FM	Football only
Camden	WRJB	98.3 FM	
Carthage	WUCZ	104.1 FM	Football only
Centerville	WNKX	96.7 FM	Football only
Calhoun (Athens/Cleveland)	WCLE	104.1 FM	
Chattanooga	WGOW	1150 AM	Women's basketball only
Chattanooga	WSKZ	106.5 FM	Football only
Clarksville	WNZE	1400 AM	Football only; basketball can be heard in this area via WGFX/Gallatin
Cleveland	WCLE	AM 1570	Women ‘s basketball only
Cookeville	WGSQ	94.7 FM	
Columbia	WKOM	101.7 FM	
Covington	WKBQ	93.5 FM	
Crossville	WOWF	102.5 FM	
Dickson	WDKN	1260 AM	Football only
Dickson	W268BN	101.5 FM	Football only; translator of WDKN
Dredsden (Martin/Paris)	WCDZ	95.1 FM	Also serves southwest Kentucky, including Fulton and Mayfield
Dyersburg	WTRO	1450 AM	Football only; can also be heard from Carruthersville, Missouri
Elizabethton	WKPP	1520 AM	Football only
Erwin	WEMB	AM 1420	Football only
Fayetteville	WYTM	105.5 FM	Football and men's basketball; can also serve Huntsville, Alabama
Franklin	WAKM	950 AM	Football and men's basketball
Gallatin (Nashville)	WGFX	104.5 FM	All sports broadcasts; also serves as the secondary Vol Network station for the Clarksville, TN/Hopkinsville, KY area, and also serves parts of south-central Kentucky, including Bowling Green
Greeneville	WGRV	1340 AM	Football and women's basketball
Greeneville	WIKQ	103.1 FM	
Hartsville	WTNK	1090 AM	Men's basketball only
Jackson	WDXI	1310 AM	Football and men's basketball
Jackson	WMXX	103.1 FM	Football only
Johnson City	WQUT	101.5 FM	Football only; also serves Kingsport and Bristol
Jonesborough (Johnson City)	WKTP	1590 AM	
Kingsport	WKPT	1400 AM	
Kingsport	WKOS	104.9 FM	
Lafayette	WLCT	102.1 FM	Football only
Lenoir City	WLIL	730 AM	Football and men's basketball
Lenoir City	WKZX-FM	93.5 FM	Football only
Lewisburg	WJJM	1490 AM	
Lewisburg	WJJM	94.3 FM	Football and men's basketball
Lexington (Jackson)	WBFG	95.9 FM	
Livingston	WLIV	920 AM	
Livingston	WUCH	96.9 FM	
Livingston (Cookeville)	WLQK	95.9 FM	Women's basketball only
Madisonville	WRKZ	1250 AM	Men's basketball only
Manchester	WFTZ	101.5 FM	Also serves Tullahoma
Martin	WCMT	1410 AM	Football only
McKimmon (Paris)	WTPR-FM	101.7 FM	
McMinnville	WAKI	1230 AM	Men's basketball only
McMinnville	WKZA	107.3 FM	Football only
Memphis	WMFS	680 AM	
Memphis	WMFS	92.9 FM	
Morristown	WCRK	1150 AM	
Newport	WLIK	1270 AM	
Oneida	WBNT	105.5 FM	
Paris	WTPR	710 AM	
Parsons	WKJQ	97.3 FM	Football only
Pulaski	WKSR	1420 AM	Football only
Pulaski	WLXA	98.3 FM	
Savannah	WKWX	93.5 FM	
Smithville	WJLE	1480 AM	
Smithville	WJLE	101.7 FM	
Soddy-Daisy (Chattanooga)	WGOW-FM	102.3 FM	Football and men's and women's basketball
Union City	WENK	1240 AM	Also serves Fulton, Kentucky and South Fulton, Tennessee
Wartburg	WECO	101.3 FM	
Waverly	WQMV	1060 AM	Football only
Winchester	WCDT	1340 AM	

==== Other areas ====
City (Station location in parentheses if not city of license)	Callsign	Frequency/Band	Notes	
Murphy, North Carolina	WCVP	600 AM	Football only	
Bridgeport, Alabama	WJTW	106.1 FM / 1480 AM	Football & Basketball	
Elsewhere in the USA	SiriusXM	n/a		Varsity Network

All sports

=== Former affiliates ===
==== Tennessee ====
City (Station location in parentheses if not city of license)	Callsign	Frequency/Band	Notes
Ashland City	WQSV	790 AM	Women's basketball only; disaffiliated in 2015
Athens	WAYA	93.9 FM	
Cookeville	WHUB	AM 1400	Moved to WBXE and WGSQ
Cowan (Winchester)	WZYX	AM 1440	
Crossville	WCSV	AM 1490	Moved to WOWF
Knoxville	WNOX	AM 1440	Former flagship
La Follette (Jacksboro)	WQLA	104.9 FM	
Lawrenceburg	WDXE	95.9 FM	
Lawrenceburg	WTNX	106.7 FM	station sold to Educational Media Foundation; now K-LOVE WLFM
Memphis	WREC	AM 600	
Murfreesboro	WBOZ	104.9 FM	
Murfreesboro	WGNS	AM 1450	Affiliated 199?-2005
Nashville	WLAC	1510 AM	Affiliation moved to WGFX/Gallatin in 2010. This staton's night-time signal granted access to nighttime Tennessee Vols football and basketball games to listeners in much of the eastern two-thirds of the U.S. and in three Canadian provinces.
Nashville	WNRQ	105.9 FM	Disaffiliated in 2010
Portland	WQKR	AM 1270	Disaffiliated in 2010. Could also serve Franklin, Kentucky.
Ripley	WTRB	AM 1570	
South Pittsburg	WEPG	AM 910	
Waynesboro	WWON	AM 930	Football-only affiliate; Disaffiliated in 2013

==== Other states ====
- Waynesville, North Carolina - WMXF-AM 1400 (football only, disaffiliated in 2010?)
- Sheffield, Alabama - WSHF AM 1380 (football only, disaffiliated in 1990s)

== Sponsors ==
- DISH Network
- Coca-Cola
- Food City
- Farm Bureau Insurance Tennessee

== See also ==
- Tennessee Volunteers
- Tennessee Volunteers basketball
- Tennessee Lady Volunteers basketball
- Tennessee Volunteers football
- WKCE - Tennessee Sports Radio - Knoxville's local sports radio station (not part of the Vol Network).
- UK Sports Network - Kentucky’s statewide radio and TV network for the Vols’ SEC rival Kentucky Wildcats.
