= Auburn Sports Network =

Collegiate sports radio network

Auburn IMG Sports Network
- Type: Radio network
- Country: United States
- Availability: Various AM and FM stations
- Headquarters: Auburn, Alabama
- Broadcast area: Alabama; Georgia (limited); Mississippi (limited); Florida Panhandle
- Owner: IMG College; Auburn University
- Affiliation: Auburn Tigers
- Webcast: Listen live (via TuneIn)
- Official website: auburntigers.com/auburn-sports-network-listen

The Auburn IMG Sports Network is the sports radio network for the Auburn Tigers, the athletic programs of Auburn University. Headquartered in Auburn, Alabama, United States, the radio network includes a maximum of 50 radio stations in Alabama, eastern Mississippi, the Florida Panhandle, and Western Georgia. It is the main rival of the Crimson Tide Sports Network, the radio network of University of Alabama athletics.

The network's television division provides the coaches’ television shows to certain TV stations serving the state of Alabama.

== Radio affiliate list ==
Auburn Sports Network affiliates
Call sign	Frequency	Band	City	State	Network status
WGZZ	94.3	FM	Waverly–Auburn–Opelika	Alabama	Flagship
WESZ-LP	98.7	FM	Abbeville	Alabama	Affiliate
WAAO-FM	103.7	FM	Andalusia	Alabama	Affiliate
WZRR	99.5	FM	Birmingham	Alabama	Affiliate
WFNS	1350	AM	Blackshear	Georgia	Affiliate
WSFN	790	AM	Brunswick	Georgia	Affiliate
WEIS	900	AM	Centre	Alabama	Affiliate
W263BW	100.1	FM	Centre	Alabama	WEIS relay
WPFL	105.1	FM	Century	Florida	Affiliate
WCOQ	90.5	FM	Colquitt	Georgia	Affiliate
WVRK	102.9	FM	Columbus	Georgia	Affiliate
WAVH	106.5	FM	Daphne–Mobile	Alabama	Affiliate
WHOS	800	AM	Decatur	Alabama	Affiliate
WZNJ	106.5	FM	Demopolis	Alabama	Affiliate
WLDQ	102.5	FM	Dothan	Alabama	Affiliate
WHEP	1310	AM	Foley	Alabama	Affiliate
WZOB	1250	AM	Fort Payne	Alabama	Affiliate
WTDR	1350	AM	Gadsden	Alabama	Affiliate
WKGA	97.5	FM	Goodwater–Alexander City	Alabama	Affiliate
WQZX	94.3	FM	Greenville	Alabama	Affiliate
WTWX	95.9	FM	Guntersville	Alabama	Affiliate
WFMH-FM	95.5	FM	Hackleburg	Alabama	Affiliate
WHSY	950	AM	Hattiesburg	Mississippi	Affiliate
WHNY	750	AM	McComb	Mississippi	Affiliate
WQRV	100.3	FM	Meridianville–Huntsville	Alabama	Affiliate
WLWI-FM	92.3	FM	Montgomery	Alabama	Affiliate
WMSP	740	AM	Montgomery	Alabama	Affiliate
WALW-LP	97.9	FM	Moulton	Alabama	Affiliate
WGSX	104.3	FM	Panama City	Florida	Affiliate
WPNN	790	AM	Pensacola	Florida	Affiliate
WPPG	101.1	FM	Repton–Evergreen	Alabama	Affiliate
WELR-FM	102.3	FM	Roanoke	Alabama	Affiliate
WLAQ	1410	AM	Rome	Georgia	Affiliate
WHBB	1490	AM	Selma	Alabama	Affiliate
WBTG-FM	106.3	FM	Sheffield	Alabama	Affiliate
WASC	1350	AM	Spartanburg	South Carolina	Football only
WTDR-FM	92.7	FM	Talledega–Anniston	Alabama	Affiliate
WJEC	106.5	FM	Vernon	Alabama	Affiliate
WVSA	1380	AM	Vernon	Alabama	Affiliate

In addition, the Auburn Sports Network is carried nationwide over SiriusXM.
