= WTID =

WTID may refer to:

- WTID (FM), a radio station (101.7 FM) licensed to serve Graceville, Florida
- WTOT (AM), a radio station (980 AM) licensed to serve Marianna, Florida, United States, which held the call sign WTID in 2020
- WFMA (FM), a radio station (102.9 FM) licensed to serve Marion, Alabama, United States, which held the call sign WTID from 2018 to 2019
- WTID (Thomaston, Alabama), a defunct radio station (103.9 FM) formerly licensed to serve Thomaston, Alabama
- WTID (Wir Tanzen Im Dreieck), a group of musicians
