= WASC =

WASC may refer to:

- Supreme Court of Western Australia
- WASC (AM), a radio station (1530 AM) licensed to Spartanburg, South Carolina, United States
- West Africa Submarine Cable
- West African School Certificate
- Western Association of Schools and Colleges
- Wisconsin Association of School Councils
