= WCLE =

WCLE may refer to:

- WCLE (AM), a radio station (1570 AM) licensed to Cleveland, Tennessee, United States
- WCLE-FM, a radio station (104.1 FM) licensed to Calhoun, Tennessee, United States
