= WTOT =

WTOT may refer to:

- WTOT (AM), a radio station (980 AM) licensed to Marianna, Florida, United States
- WTID (FM), a radio station (101.7 FM) licensed to Graceville, Florida, United States, which used the call sign WTOT-FM from 2002 to 2020
