= WTZQ =

- Hendersonville, North Carolina; United States
- Frequency: 1600 kHz
- Branding: WTZQ FM 95.3 AM 1600

Programming
- Format: Oldies/Adult standards
- Affiliations: North Carolina News Network, ABC Radio

Ownership
- Owner: Paige Posey and Mark Warwick; (Flat Rock Multimedia, LLC)

History
- First air date: 1963 (as WHVL)
- Former call signs: WHVL (1963–1987)

Technical information
- Licensing authority: FCC
- Facility ID: 68831
- Class: D
- Power: 5,000 watts day 30 watts night
- Transmitter coordinates: 35°18′53.00″N 82°25′58.00″W
- Translator: 95.3 W237EE (Hendersonville)

Links
- Public license information: Public file; LMS
- Webcast: Listen Live
- Website: wtzq.com

WTZQ (1600 AM) is a radio station broadcasting an oldies/adult standards format. Licensed to Hendersonville, North Carolina, United States, the station is currently owned by Paige Posey and Mark Warwick, through licensee Flat Rock Multimedia, LLC, and features local programming and music 24 hours a day.

== History ==
WHVL signed on in 1963. From 1977 to 1987 the station broadcast a Top 40 format. In 1987, WHVL changed call letters to WTZQ and began playing "Solid Gold". In summer 1988, the format changed to "Simply Beautiful".

In 1990, Mystle and Jim Butler, who had owned the station since 1986, sold WTZQ to United Broadcasting Enterprises, Inc. Glenn W. Wilcox, Sr. sold WTZQ to J. Ardell Sink in 1997. Houston Broadcasting Corp. bought WTZQ in 2002. For years WTZQ and WISE aired the same programming, Stardust adult standards from ABC Radio, which was discontinued in 2010. WTZQ continued airing the music even after WISE changed to sports talk. Sink's Mark Media, Inc., owner of WKYK and WTOE, bought the station in 2008. Mark Warwick, who began work in 1995 at WISE, became general manager of WTZQ. With the purchase came a community service commitment.

Early in 2010, the Stardust format, which had become Timeless, was discontinued. WTZQ is no longer affiliated with a satellite music service, choosing instead to program their own oldies / adult standards / nostalgia format.
