= WJEC =

WJEC may refer to:

- WJEC (exam board), a UK exam board
- WJEC (FM), a radio station (106.5 FM) licensed to serve Vernon, Alabama, United States
- World Journalism Education Congress, a triennial international academic event on journalism education
