= WCPS =

Radio station in Tarboro, North Carolina

- Tarboro, North Carolina; United States
- Broadcast area: Rocky Mount-Wilson
- Frequency: 760 kHz

Programming
- Format: Urban Gospel, Urban Oldies, Blues

Ownership
- Owner: Reverend Thomas L. Walker; (Trey and Associates, LLC)

History
- First air date: January 1947
- Call sign meaning: W Coastal Plains Station

Technical information
- Licensing authority: FCC
- Facility ID: 14004
- Class: D
- Power: 1,000 watts day
- Transmitter coordinates: 35°55′44.6″N 77°34′11.9″W
- Translator: (see below)

Links
- Public license information: Public file; LMS
- Website: www.wcpsradio.com

WCPS (760 AM) is a radio station broadcasting an Urban Gospel, Urban Oldies, Blues format. Licensed to Tarboro, North Carolina, United States, it serves the Tarboro and Rocky Mount area. The station is currently licensed to Trey and Associates, LLC.

WCPS broadcasts only during the daytime, to avoid conflicting with WJR from Detroit, an AM clear channel station that broadcasts on the same frequency.

== History ==
In 1946, Tarboro Broadcasting Company applied for station WTNC in Tarboro on 760 kHz. However, the FCC pulled back the application due to transmitter issues and WCPS was finally licensed on October 30, 1947, to Coastal Plains Broadcasting Company, Inc.

In 1951, WCPS signed an affiliation agreement with the World Broadcasting System, which distributed music to radio stations on phonograph records.

In 1968, WJR in Detroit complained that WCPS was interfering with its clear channel signal. Making this politically sensitive was that a sitting Congressman L.H. Fountain was a co-owner of the station. At the time, concerns were being raised if the FCC could properly regulate the media properties of then-President Lyndon Johnson.

In July 1971, the FCC was informed of a change of control of the Corporation removing R. M. "Runt" Fountain, Sr.

In 1974, ownership of 50% of the corporation transferred to Robert L. Harper, the station's general manager.

On July 4, 1975, the station (along with the FM station) burned to the ground.

In 1985, then President and CEO Robert Harper received the Earl Gluck distinguished service award from the North Carolina association of broadcasters. In addition to his work at the radio station, he served as president of the local chamber of commerce, president of the local Little league, president of the United fund, president of the local People's Bank branch, and president of the local country club.

FCC records in 1987-1988 were on paper. They show a transfer to Great American East, Inc in 1987 and another transfer to Coastal Plains Media, Inc. in 1988. The transfer in 1987 coincided with the retirement of Mr Harper. In 1988, transfer was made to a similarly named Coastal Plains Media, Inc.

By 1999, when ownership reporting was computerized at the FCC, Coastal Plains Media was owned by Donald and Barbara Curtis. Mr. Curtis continues to very active in radio ownership is Eastern North Carolina through Curtis Media Group.

From April 2000 until 2019, the station was owned by Jimmy "JJ" Johnson as Johnson Broadcast Ventures, LTD.

On July 1, 2019, the FCC consented to the sale of the station for $250,000 to Reverend Thomas L. Walker, operating as Trey and Associates, LLC. $150,000 of the purchase price was covered by a promissory note.

== Translator ==
In addition to the main station, WCPS is relayed by a translator to permit programming to continue after sunset.

Broadcast translator for WCPS
Call sign	Frequency	City of license	FID	ERP (W)	HAAT	Class	Transmitter coordinates	FCC info
W242DG	96.3 FM	Tarboro, North Carolina	202415	125	90 m (295 ft)	D	35º54'11"N, 77º46'56"W	LMS
