= WIKQ =

- Tusculum, Tennessee; United States
- Broadcast area: Tennessee/Virginia Tri-Cities
- Frequency: 103.1 MHz

Programming
- Format: Country

Ownership
- Owner: Radio Greeneville, Inc.
- Sister stations: WGRV-AM, WSMG-AM

Technical information
- Licensing authority: FCC
- Class: A
- Power: 6000 Watts
- Transmitter coordinates: 36°07′40″N 82°37′57″W

Links
- Public license information: Public file; LMS
- Website: http://www.greeneville.com/wikq/

WIKQ (103.1 FM) is a radio station broadcasting a country music format. It is licensed to Tusculum, Tennessee, United States, and serves the Tennessee/Virginia Tri-Cities area. The station is owned by Radio Greeneville, Inc.
