= WBPC =

Radio station in Ebro–Panama City, Florida

Coordinates: 30.5685°N 85.8077°W

- Ebro, Florida; United States
- Broadcast area: Panama City, Florida
- Frequency: 95.1 MHz
- Branding: Beach 95.1

Programming
- Format: Classic hits
- Affiliations: United Stations Radio Networks; Crimson Tide Sports Network

Ownership
- Owner: Beach Radio, Inc.

History
- First air date: 2005
- Call sign meaning: Beach Panama City

Technical information
- Licensing authority: FCC
- Facility ID: 164212
- Class: C3
- ERP: 21,000 watts
- HAAT: 91 meters (299 ft)

Links
- Public license information: Public file; LMS
- Webcast: Listen Live
- Website: beach951.com

WBPC (95.1 FM) is an independently owned commercial radio station licensed to Ebro, Florida, with offices and studios located in Panama City, Florida. WBPC airs a classic hits music format, branded as "Beach 95.1", ABC News Now in morning drive, and is an affiliate of the Crimson Tide Sports Network.

Other notable programming on Beach 95.1 includes "Rewind With Gary Bryan", Saturday mornings from 6-9 am Central; "Powerline" with Jon Rivers, Sunday from 5 until 10 am, "America's Greatest Hits," hosted by Scott Shannon, Sunday nights from 8-midnight. Beach 95.1 also broadcasts the praise and worship service of Lighthouse Church of Panama City, Sundays from 10-11 am.

Beach 95.1's programming is streamed online at the station website, beach951.com, and is available via the TuneIn app and at www.tunein.com.

== History ==
WBPC first went on air in 2005 as B·95, which primarily aired a classic hits format. In 2009, WBPC was purchased by Beach Radio, Inc., from Bay Broadcasting, and its branding was changed to Beach 95.1. Concurrent with the sale, veteran Panama City radio personalities Lisa Lynnette and David Nolin (now the station's Vice President of Operations and Programming, joined the station for midday and afternoon drive, respectively, joining longtime personality Jim Dooley, the morning drive host. Tom Kent hosts the nighttime show on Beach 95.1. Lynnette left the station in March 2013, and Tori Shay took her place as midday host at that time. Dooley left in August 2015 and was replaced in morning drive by Wayne Gentry, also recognized as a local television meteorologist. On air hosts on Beach 95.1 now include Henry Brigmond in morning drive, and Nolin again in afternoons. Steve Kent and Jackie Newton host overnight and weekend programs.
