= WKKQ =

- Barbourville, Kentucky; United States
- Frequency: 96.1 MHz
- Branding: Mix 96

Programming
- Format: Hot adult contemporary
- Affiliations: Fox News Radio; Premiere Radio Networks; Westwood One

Ownership
- Owner: Choice Radio Corporation

History
- First air date: October 2, 1974 (as WYWY-FM on 93.5)
- Former call signs: WYWY-FM (1974–2000)
- Former frequencies: 93.5 (1974-1990s)

Technical information
- Licensing authority: FCC
- Facility ID: 3954
- Class: C3
- ERP: 25,000 watts
- HAAT: 100 meters (330 ft)
- Transmitter coordinates: 36°51′55″N 83°53′55″W

Links
- Public license information: Public file; LMS
- Website: www.wkkqfm.com

WKKQ (96.1 FM) is a radio station broadcasting a hot adult contemporary format, licensed to Barbourville, Kentucky, United States. The station is owned by Choice Radio Corporation.

== History ==
In 1974, WYWY-FM signed on the air at 93.5 on the FM dial. According to the book "Towers Over Kentucky", WYWY-FM tried big band and easy listening in the daytime with rock for the teens at night. Later on, WYWY (950 AM) went country and WYWY-FM became adult contemporary. With the FM rule changes in the 1990s, the Engles were able to find a way to up power to 25 kilowatts by moving to 96.1 on the dial, where they put the top country format, while turning the AM station to southern gospel. On November 10, 2000, WYWY-FM changed its call sign to WKKQ.
