= WLDX =

- Fayette, Alabama; United States
- Broadcast area: Berry, Alabama; Millport, Alabama
- Frequency: 990 kHz
- Branding: Big Cat 97.1

Programming
- Format: Classic hits
- Affiliations: Townhall News

Ownership
- Owner: Dean Broadcasting, Inc.

History
- First air date: September 3, 1949 (as WWWF)
- Former call signs: WWWF (1949–1987)

Technical information
- Licensing authority: FCC
- Facility ID: 60505
- Class: D
- Power: 1,000 watts (day); 42 watts (night)
- Transmitter coordinates: 33°41′6.8″N 87°49′15.5″W
- Translator: 97.1 W246DJ (Fayette)

Links
- Public license information: Public file; LMS
- Website: wldx971.com

WLDX (990 AM) is a radio station licensed to serve Fayette, Alabama, US. The station is currently licensed to Dean Broadcasting, Inc. but under the lease management of Hometown Radio Partnership of Fayette, AL.

July 17, 2017, WLDX switched from a primarily country music format to Christian Broadcasting, playing a variety of Christian programs and a blend of Southern Gospel and Contemporary Christian music. Sports programming on the station includes University of Alabama Crimson Tide football and men's basketball as a member of the Crimson Tide Sports Network plus Fayette County High School football. News programming is provided by Yellow Hammer Radio and the Alabama Radio Network. The tradio program "Switch and Swap" has been a constant fixture on the station since it first signed on in 1949. They have since flipped to classic hits.

== History ==
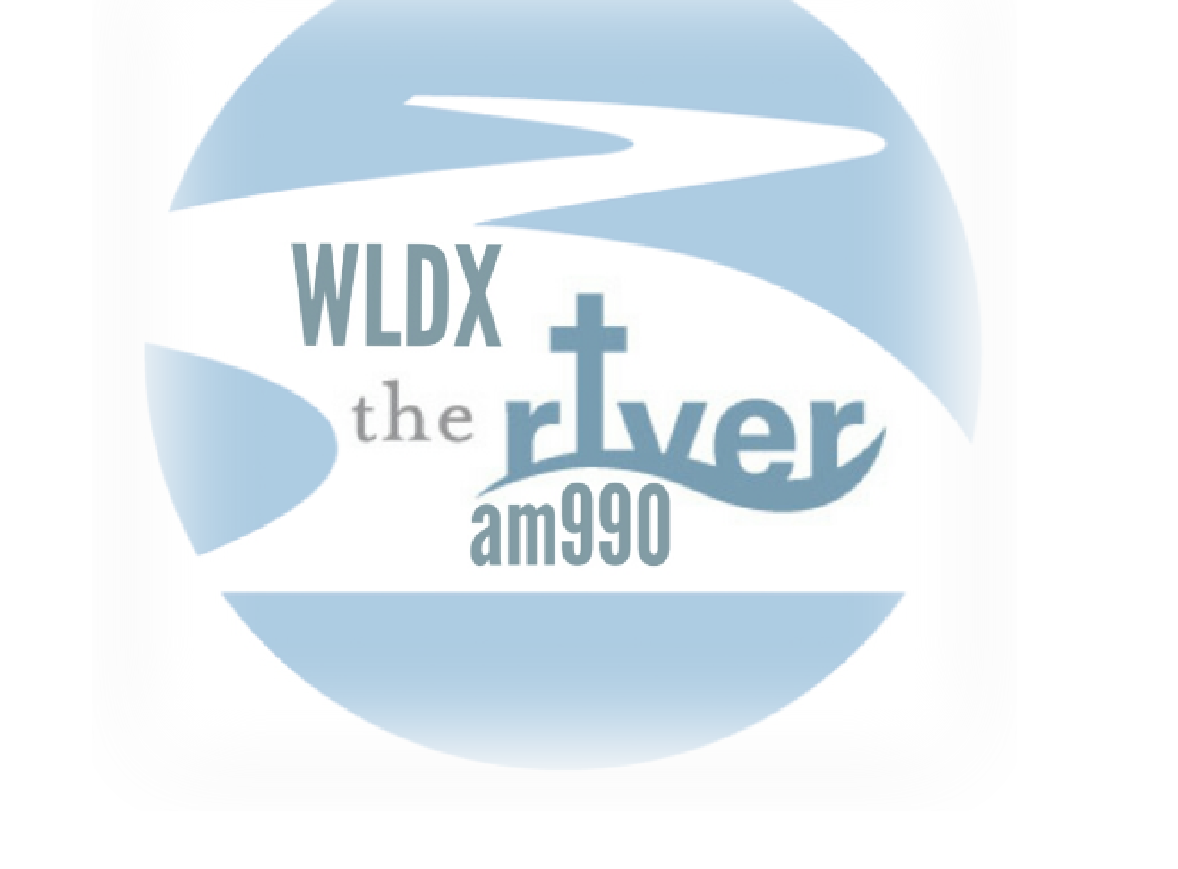
WLDX - The River

This station began broadcasting as WWWF on September 3, 1949, with a 1,000 watt daytime-only signal. The station was licensed to Bankhead Broadcasting Company, Inc., whose sole owner was Walter Will Bankhead. Bankhead's first station, WWWB in Jasper, Alabama (1240 AM, now WJLX) was named for his initials. This Jasper station began licensed broadcasting with 250 watts of power on 1240 AM on November 2, 1946... In 1955, the station got a construction permit from the FCC that allowed then to move to the current 1360 AM broadcast frequency and increase signal power to 1,000 watts. The station now holds the callsign WIXI. Additionally, in January 2010, acting on engineering data filed with the FCC, WIXI increased its daytime power to 12,000 watts.. In 1962 WWWB-FM 102.5 was added in Jasper, (now WDXB licensed to Pelham, Alabama broadcasting to the Birmingham Metro area, with an effective radiated power of 90,000 watts) WWWB-FM was initially signed on the air with an effective radiated power of 39,000 watts... WWWB's sister station WWWR in Russellville, Alabama (920 AM, now WGOL) which also went on the air in 1949, was named for "Walter Will's Russellville". WWWF was similarly chosen as the callsign to mean "Walter Will's Fayette".

In the 1960s, WWWF broadcast a format called "Something for Everyone" featuring country in the morning, a half-hour of Gospel music at midday, easy listening until mid-afternoon, then rock music for the rest of the day. In the 1980, WLDX changed their format to country music full-time.

Gorman Jackson "Jack" Black was the station's original program director and became the general manager in 1954. Black also founded the weekly Fayette Country Broadcaster newspaper and served as its editor and publisher from 1962 to 1982. An Alabama native and University of Alabama graduate, Black remained as general manager of WWWF until the station was sold in 1986.

In March 1986, Bankhead Broadcasting Fayette, Inc., reached an agreement to sell this station to W. A. Grant Jr. and Eloise Thomley doing business as SIS Sound of Fayette, Inc. The deal was approved by the FCC on June 4, 1986, and the transaction was consummated on October 28, 1986. Under the new ownership, the station was assigned the current WLDX call letters by the FCC on June 22, 1987. Joe "Jackson" Redker joined WLDX in August, 1990, and was the Program Director until 2013.

In September 1996, SIS Sound of Fayette, Inc., contracted to sell this station to co-owner Eloise Thomley and her husband Wayne, as owners of Thomley Broadcasting Co., Inc. The deal was approved by the FCC on October 23, 1996, and the transaction was consummated on November 5, 1996. Eloise Thomley served as general manager from 1986 until May 31, 2005.

In April 2005, Thomley Broadcasting Co., Inc. (Eloise F. Thomley, president/director) agreed to sell this station to Dean Broadcasting, Inc. (J. Wiley Dean, president) for a reported sale price of $450,000. The deal was approved by the FCC on June 1, 2005, and the transaction was consummated on the same day.

In July 2017, Dean Broadcasting agreed to a Lease Management Agreement with Hometown Radio Partnership of Fayette, Alabama, owned by DeWayne and Kellie Guyton of Winfield, Alabama. In September 2019 WLDX changed their format from contemporary Christian to classic hits, branded as "Big Cat 97.1".
