= WFTZ =

- Manchester, Tennessee; United States
- Frequency: 101.5 MHz
- Branding: Rooster 101.5

Programming
- Format: Hot adult contemporary
- Affiliations: Premiere Networks

Ownership
- Owner: Peter Bowman; (Bowman Broadcasting, LLC)

History
- First air date: November 1992

Technical information
- Licensing authority: FCC
- Facility ID: 52436
- Class: A
- ERP: 5,700 watts
- HAAT: 100 meters
- Transmitter coordinates: 35°23′51″N 86°08′39″W

Links
- Public license information: Public file; LMS
- Webcast: Listen Live
- Website: rooster1015.com

WFTZ (101.5 FM "Rooster 101.5") is a radio station broadcasting a hot adult contemporary format. Licensed to Manchester, Tennessee, United States, it serves Coffee County and surrounding counties. It first began broadcasting in 1992. The station is currently owned by Josh and Holly Peterson, doing business as Peterson Media Group, Inc (Coffee County Broadcasting Inc). The station maintains studios located in Tullahoma, Tennessee.

== History ==
WFTZ began operation in November 1992 as a 3,000 watt FM station with offices located in Manchester and a tower located between Manchester and Tullahoma.

On December 5, 2016, WFTZ shifted their format from adult contemporary (branded as "Fantasy Radio") to hot adult contemporary, branded as "Rooster 101.5". A signal increase to 5,700 watts accompanied the format change, along with the programming and music selection being taken in-house.

== Programming ==
WFTZ offers a variety of local programming to its listeners. It is currently the home of the Megan in the Afternoons, Jay & the Morning Brew, and Pop Crush Nights.

WFTZ also features local news and sports at rooster1015.com. Rooster is a proud member of the Vol Radio Network and Shelbyville Central High School athletics.
