= WBSR =

Radio station in Pensacola, Florida

- Pensacola, Florida; United States
- Broadcast area: Pensacola area
- Frequency: 1450 kHz
- Branding: The Fan 101

Programming
- Format: Sports
- Affiliations: Fox Sports Radio; Florida Gators; Orlando Magic; Pensacola Ice Flyers; Tampa Bay Buccaneers; Tampa Bay Lightning; Tampa Bay Rays

Ownership
- Owner: Miracle Radio, Inc.
- Sister stations: WPNN

History
- First air date: 1946

Technical information
- Licensing authority: FCC
- Facility ID: 18399
- Class: C
- Power: 1,000 watts unlimited
- Transmitter coordinates: 30°27′10.00″N 87°14′26.00″W
- Translator: 101.1 W266AL (Pensacola)

Links
- Public license information: Public file; LMS
- Webcast: Listen live
- Website: foxsportspensacola.com

WBSR (1450 AM), branded on-air as The Fan 101, is a United States radio station owned by Miracle Radio, Inc. Licensed to Pensacola, Florida, it currently airs a sports format. WBSR is the second oldest radio station in Pensacola and one of the first AM radio stations on the Florida Gulf Coast to add an FM translator. WBSR can be heard 24 hours a day at 1450 AM and 101.1 FM. It has been at the same location since 1946.

== History ==
WBSR was a successful Top 40 radio station from the 1960s to the mid-80s. Back then it was owned by Seaway Broadcasting. Notable DJs were Jay Thomas and Jim Golden. In January 1985, the station went off the air and was sold to Fred Brewer, owner of WMEZ (94.1 FM); it returned with a satellite-delivered oldies format. After a few years, it switched to a Soft Adult Contemporary format. In 2011, WBSR switched to Sports Talk format, branded as ESPN Pensacola, & became an affiliate of ESPN Radio.

On May 31, 2017, WBSR dropped its sports format and began stunting. On June 20, 2017, after less than a month of stunting, WBSR switched to a simulcast of contemporary Christian-formatted WOWB 90.9 FM Brewton, Alabama, branded as WOW 101.1.

On October 19, 2020, WBSR dropped its simulcast with WOWB and changed their format to sports, branded as "The Fan 101", with programming from Fox Sports Radio.
