= WAAX =

- Gadsden, Alabama; United States
- Frequency: 570 kHz
- Branding: News Radio 101.9 Big WAAX

Programming
- Format: Talk radio
- Affiliations: Fox News Radio; Premiere Networks; Compass Media Networks

Ownership
- Owner: iHeartMedia, Inc.; (iHM Licenses, LLC)
- Sister stations: WGMZ

History
- First air date: 1947
- Former call signs: WGWC (1947–1956); WCAS (1956–1960)

Technical information
- Licensing authority: FCC
- Facility ID: 22996
- Class: B
- Power: 5,000 watts (day); 500 watts (night)
- Transmitter coordinates: 33°58′45″N 86°0′9″W
- Translator: 101.9 W270DQ (Gadsden)

Links
- Public license information: Public file; LMS
- Webcast: Listen live
- Website: 1019bigwaax.iheart.com

WAAX (570 AM) is a commercial radio station licensed to Gadsden, Alabama, United States, featuring a talk radio format. it is owned by iHeartMedia, Inc., with studios and transmitter on Whorton Bend Road at Rainbow Drive (U.S. Route 411). WAAX is also heard over low-power FM translator W270DQ at 101.9 MHz.

== History ==
=== WGWD ===
The station signed on the air in 1947 as WGWD, and it was powered at 1,000 watts as a daytime station. The station signed off at local sunset. WGWD was owned by the Covington family of Montgomery, Alabama. In its early days the station operated from studios in the original Pioneer Life Insurance building in downtown Gadsden.

In 1955, the station was bought by broadcaster Charles A. Smithgall, who had enjoyed great success on WSB 750 in Atlanta. Smithgall changed the call letters to WCAS, raised the power level to 5,000 watts in 1959 and was the station's general manager until 1960. Smithgall hired radio engineer Calvin Williamson to upgrade the signal. Williamson installed a three-tower directional array on what was a cow pasture on Rainbow Drive, just north of the Gadsden Country Country Club golf course. This would prove to be a great location, as the city grew south, traveling down Rainbow Drive. In the process, Smithgall also changed the call letters to WAAX. The location and set-up of the towers allowed WAAX to be heard into Georgia and Tennessee.

WAAX became a CBS Radio Network affiliate, as was announced at the end of the 02/21/1960 episode "That Was No Lady" on the CBS radio program Have Gun-Will Travel. The station programmed a full service format of light pop music during the day along with the schedule of CBS programs at night.

=== Big WAAX ===
In 1962, Mike McDougald of Georgia, also previously on WSB, bought into the station, and became its general manager. McDougald continued the middle of the road (MOR) sound during the day. But he wanted to attract younger listeners at night. McDougald hired Mike Morelock to become the night time Top 40 disc jockey. In 1964 the station established the "Pic A Burger Hot Line Request Show" featuring Morelock playing the music and Bob Mayben answering two telephones directly connected to, and located at, a special booth at the local Pic-A-Burger drive-in restaurant. They began calling the station "BIG WAAX". (Originally, records were made of wax.) A popular station slogan was "BIG WAAX, the station you hear everywhere."

The station gained the image as a news leader. McDougald outfitted the station vehicle with police and fire radios, and installed one of the first "car phones" in the area, actually a two-way radio that could call any telephone number from the road. From the late 1950s through early 1963, Robert Allen Chumley Sr. was a news reporter, commercial salesman, and later, an evening classical music host for WAAX. At the time of this change, the music schedule was country music in the morning and Top 40 in the afternoon, with classical music played on Sunday nights. He reported from various events such as shopping center openings, fairs and horse shows. But his main beat was the Civil Rights Movement where he covered church protest meetings and Ku Klux Klan (KKK) rallies. He interviewed such notables as Martin Luther King Jr., Ralph Abernathy, Marlon Brando and Harry Belafonte for WAAX. The two antagonistic groups, segregationists and integrationists, respected Chumley, and by virtue WAAX, for thorough and impartial news reporting. There were threats from extremists on both sides by phone as well as automobile. Chumley was sent by the station to Montgomery to cover such events as the gubernatorial race with a focus on George C. Wallace.

WAAX gained recognition with national news organizations through Chumley’s coverage of such national issues as well as his association with Clancy Lake of WAPI in Birmingham as well as with those of WSFA television in Montgomery. Chumley, by his and his wife’s own record collection, brought Gadsden a refined program of the arts as part of the general format of a Top 40, country music and news. In 1973, Dave Fitz came to the station as Executive News Director, remaining with WAAX for 25 years. With his recognizable voice and no-nonsense delivery, Fitz was regarded as the preeminent radio newscaster in Gadsden for over 30 years. Fitz died on August 9, 2009.

=== FM radio and talk ===
In 1974, WAAX added an FM station. Today, it is co-owned WQEN, now licensed to Trussville with studios in Birmingham. At the time, it was 103.7 WLJM in Gadsden. The station was sold to WAAX executives Charles Smithgall and Mike McDougald. In 1975, it took its current call letters. After a brief run as an automated easy listening station, WQEN became one of the first FM Top 40 stations in Alabama. Its slogan was "Alabama's Music Giant" referring to its big 100,000-watt signal.

As FM radio became the band for music listening, WAAX added more talk and news programs. Over time, music was eliminated and WAAX became a talk radio station. In 2000, the station was acquired by San Antonio-based Clear Channel Communications, the forerunner to today's iHeartMedia. Morning drive time was hosted by local personality Dave Mack, who was also a frequent guest and commentator on Nancy Grace's weeknight talk show on HLN. In 1998, Program Director Bill Seckbach and General Manage Kathy Boggs signed the station up to carry popular talk and sports programs including The Rush Limbaugh Show and The Paul Finebaum Show, focusing on college sports in the South.

== Programming ==
WAAX simulcasts the morning show from WERC-FM in Birmingham, Alabama; the remainder of the schedule is nationally syndicated conservative talk shows.

Previous logo
