= Wisconsin Association of School Councils =

Youth organizations based in Wisconsin

- Abbreviation: WASC
- Formation: 1935
- Headquarters: Madison, Wisconsin
- Region served: 6
- Affiliations: National Association of Student Councils
- Website: http://www.wasc.org

The Wisconsin Association of School Councils (WASC) is a "statewide organization of public, private, and parochial elementary, middle, junior, and senior high school student leadership groups dedicated to the continuation and expansion of leadership development and student responsibilities in Wisconsin." It is a non-profit, student-led, student-run youth leadership and advocacy organization.

== History ==
The Wisconsin Association of School Councils was founded at the University of Wisconsin–Madison in 1935. In that year, it was named the Wisconsin High School Student Council Association. (WHSSCA)

From 1935 to 1946, WHSSCA held statewide conferences for high school student councils, sponsored by and at the University of Wisconsin–Madison. In 1946, Gerald Van Pool voiced concern about how the organization was being run. He then began serving as the Executive Secretary to strengthen the organization of the association. Van Pool accepted a job at the National Student Council Association in Washington, D.C., in 1947 after serving as Executive Secretary for one year. Van Pool influenced the WHSSCA into joining the National Student Council Association.

In January 1948, the name of the association changed from the Wisconsin High School Student Council Association (WHSSCA) to the Wisconsin Association of Student Councils (WASC) This happened under the direction of Bernard A. Kennedy of Prairie du Chien, the Executive Secretary from 1947–1951.

The WASC’s third Executive Secretary was George Heatherington of La Crosse, (1951–1957), the fourth was Ralph Mithy of Janesville, (1957–1959) and the fifth was Donald A. Wendt of Madison (1959–1972). During Wendt’s term, the WASC was subject to protest and request to change, but the association remained constant. In YEAR, a monthly Newsletter was created and was edited by the Executive Secretary. In 1961, Gerald Van Pool and Donald A. Wendt structured the first WASC Summer Leadership Workshop, held in Stevens Point, Wisconsin.

In 1972, the sixth Executive Secretary, Larry Hanson, Plainfield, was elected (1972–1973). During his term, a new constitution and by-laws were established, and the Wisconsin Secondary School Administrators Association (WSSAA) began sponsoring the WASC. The new constitution was ratified in October 1973, which created a State Governing Board and Executive Committee. These consisted of an equal ratio of students and adults elected from within six regions. There was to be also an equality of representation of junior and middle school (JAM) and senior high schools (SHS). The member schools of each region were required to have two annual meetings, and the state conference was moved from fall to spring. With the implication of the State Governing Board and Executive Committee and new stipulations, the WASC became the country's only student council organization with equality of students and adults as voting representatives.

Donald C. Larsen was hired in the fall of 1973 and worked as the first shared WSSAA/WASC Executive, and served as the WASC's Executive Director, a position previously named Executive Secretary (1973–2000). To more correctly describe school involvement in their organization, the WASC replaced the word "Student" with the word "School" in their title; making their name the Wisconsin Association of School Councils. Larsen created a foundation committed to enhancing student leadership in the WASC.

The WASC State office was created in Stevens Point, but moved to Madison in 1979. A series of programs were established in the 1970s and 1980s for students and advisors to advance their leadership abilities. Some include Annual WASC Advisor Conference (1973), Cheer/Poms Camps (1975), Annual Nation Honor Society State Conference (1977), and Annual Elementary School State Conference (1979), Advanced Summer Leadership Camps, Wisconsin Association of Cheer/Pom Coaches (WACPC) (1988).

In the 1990s, two more state offices were added to the organization for JAM schools. On December 15, 1997, the WASC Governing Board approved the WASC FOUNDATION and ENDOWMENT organization and the WASC TORCH BEARERS. Succeeding Donald C. Larsen as Executive Director was Roger L. Chambers (2000–2005), then Michelle McGrath (2000-).

== Structure ==
=== Regions ===
The WASC splits Wisconsin into six regions. Those are, I: Whitetail Region; II: Northlands Region; III: Fox River Valley Region; IV: Metropolitan Region; V: Capitol Region; VI: Big Rivers Region. Each region has their own bylaws and elect new Regional Officers each year. Student officers serve for one year, and adults serve for three years.

=== Regional Bylaws ===
Each regions' bylaws consist of ordinances regarding name, membership, organization and management, caucuses, regional officers, duties of regional officers, vacancies, and amendments.

== Events ==
The WASC offers many events including:

- Leadership Camp: July, Ripon College
- Leadership Institute: October, Kalahari Resort
- Leadership Day with the Bucks: November, Milwaukee
- Fall Regional Summits: November, Location is based on region
- Camp Reunion: January, Location varies
- IGNITE Leadership Summit: February, Madison
- State Conference: April, Madison
