= WURL =

Moody, Alabama; United States
- Broadcast area: Greater Birmingham
- Frequency: 760 kHz
- Branding: WURL Radio

Programming
- Format: Southern gospel

Ownership
- Owner: Donald Jennings Evangelistic Association

History
- First air date: November 1984
- Call sign meaning: "Where You ARe Loved"

Technical information
- Licensing authority: FCC
- Facility ID: 65459
- Class: D
- Power: 1,000 watts (days only)
- Transmitter coordinates: 33°35′13.00″N 86°28′18.00″W

Links
- Public license information: Public file; LMS
- Webcast: Listen live
- Website: wurlradio.com

WURL (760 AM) is a non-commercial radio station licensed to Moody, Alabama, United States, and serving Greater Birmingham during the daytime hours only. Owned by the Donald Jennings Evangelistic Association, WURL airs a Southern Gospel format with its studios and transmitter on Radio Park Drive in Moody. The association is a non-profit organization. It seeks donations on the air and on its website.

WURL is also available online.

== History ==
The station signed on the air in October 1984. It was owned by Cooke Broadcasting with its studios and offices in Leeds, Alabama.

It has always had the call sign WURL. It began by playing country music but in 1988, it became a Christian radio station.
