= WKYK =

- Burnsville, North Carolina; United States
- Frequency: 940 kHz

Programming
- Format: Classic country
- Affiliations: ABC News Radio

Ownership
- Owner: Mark Media, Inc.

History
- First air date: May 1967

Technical information
- Licensing authority: FCC
- Facility ID: 40247
- Class: B
- Power: 4,600 watts day 250 watts night
- Transmitter coordinates: 35°55′32″N 82°16′20″W
- Translator: 104.7 W284DK (Burnsville)

Links
- Public license information: Public file; LMS
- Webcast: Listen Live
- Website: WKYK/WTOE Online

WKYK (940 AM) is a radio station broadcasting a classic country music format. Licensed to Burnsville, North Carolina, United States. The station is currently owned by Mark Media, Inc.

== History ==
J. Ardell Sink signed on WKYK in May 1967. In 1971, Burnsville Broadcasting, Inc. became Mark Media, Inc. after several purchases. While the company has had stations in Charlotte and Asheville in North Carolina and Greenville and Charleston in South Carolina, the company remained in Burnsville.

Former logo

Sink's son Michael was named president of Mark Media, Inc. and Mark Broadcasting, Inc. in 2009, adding to his duties as general manager of WKYK and WTOE and host of "Mike in the Morning" on WKYK.
