= WSMG =

- Greeneville, Tennessee; United States
- Frequency: 1450 kHz
- Branding: Jewel 95.5

Programming
- Format: Oldies/Sports
- Affiliations: Citadel Media, ESPN Radio

Ownership
- Owner: Radio Greeneville
- Sister stations: WGRV

History
- First air date: 1961

Technical information
- Licensing authority: FCC
- Facility ID: 7834
- Class: C
- Power: 670 watts day 670 watts night
- Transmitter coordinates: 36°10′10.00″N 82°50′52.00″W
- Repeater: 95.5 W238DC (Greeneville)

Links
- Public license information: Public file; LMS
- Webcast: Listen Live
- Website: WSMG Online

WSMG (1450 AM, "Jewel 95.5") is a radio station broadcasting an oldies music format. Licensed to Greeneville, Tennessee, United States, the station is currently owned by Radio Greeneville and features programming from Citadel Media and ESPN Radio.

From 2003 to 2017 WSMG was branded as "Oldies 1450".

== Jewel 95.5 ==
On July 25, 2018, WSMG re-branded as "Jewel 95.5" named after the former Greeneville, Tennessee nickname "Jewel of the Mountains". The first song played was R.O.C.K. in the U.S.A. by John Cougar Mellencamp Syndicated programming includes "America's Greatest Hits" with Scott Shannon, Retromix with Christian Wheel, both versions of American Top 40 with Casey Kasem, Absolutely 80's with Nina Blackwood, and Acoustic Storm with Audrey Parets.

Former logo
