= WGRV (AM) =

- Greeneville, Tennessee; United States
- Frequency: 1340 kHz
- Branding: News Radio 1340

Programming
- Format: News/talk
- Affiliations: Fox News Radio; Westwood One

Ownership
- Owner: Radio Greeneville, Inc.
- Sister stations: WSMG; WIKQ

History
- First air date: November 16, 1946
- Call sign meaning: Greeneville

Technical information
- Licensing authority: FCC
- Facility ID: 54602
- Class: C
- Power: 1,000 watts unlimited
- Transmitter coordinates: 36°10′10.4″N 82°50′51.6″W
- Translator: 99.5 W258DM (Greeneville)

Links
- Public license information: Public file; LMS
- Webcast: Listen live
- Website: www.wgrv.com

WGRV (1340 AM and 99.5 FM, "Hometown Radio") is a radio station broadcasting a News Talk Information and Traditional Country format. Licensed to Greeneville, Tennessee, United States, the station is owned by Radio Greeneville, Inc. and features programming from Fox News Radio and Westwood One.

WGRV also broadcasts community information on Comcast Cable, channel 18, which shows local events, community calendar items, local video of interest, and community birthdays and simulcasts WGRV's live shows and newscasts.

WGRV signed on the air on November 16, 1946, with a live broadcast from the ballroom of the Brumley Hotel in downtown Greeneville.

WGRV carries a wide variety of community programming, including broadcasting live from local sports and community events.
