= WCLE-FM =

Radio station in Tennessee

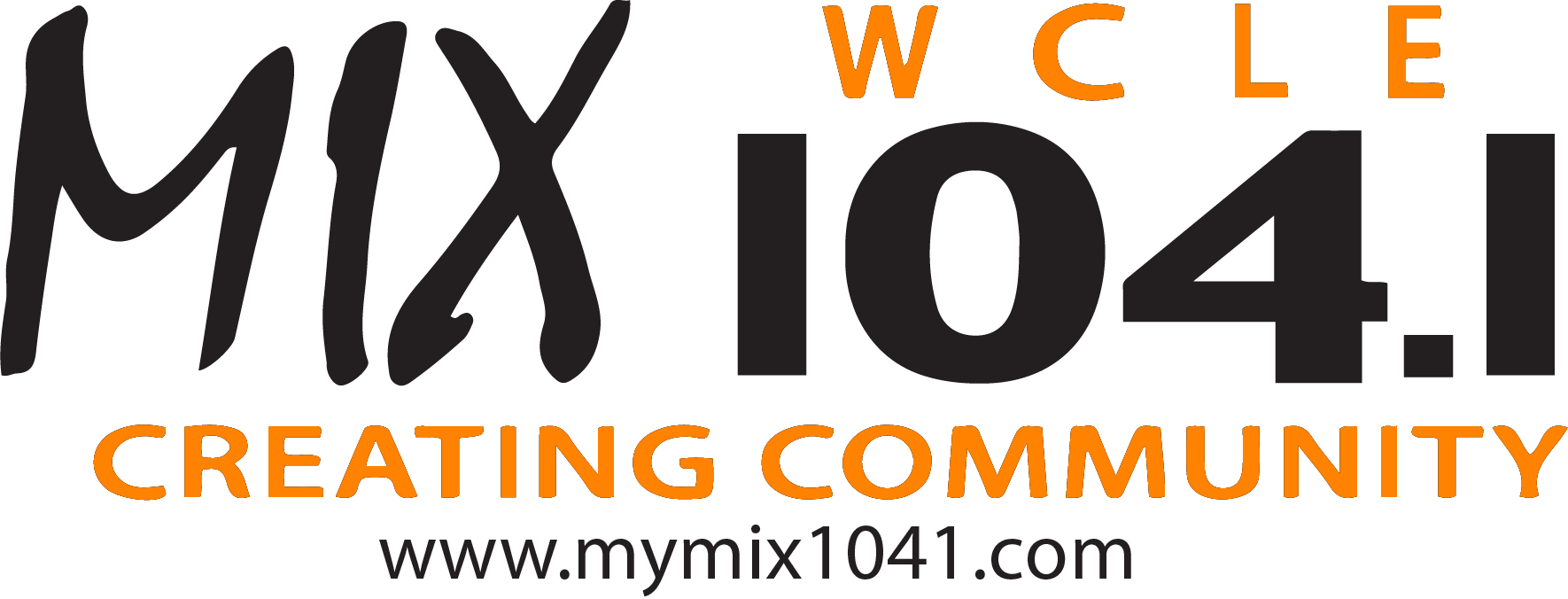
- Calhoun, Tennessee; United States
- Broadcast area: Cleveland, Tennessee; Calhoun, Tennessee; Ooltewah, Tennessee; Benton, Tennessee; Bradley County, Tennessee; Athens, Tennessee
- Frequency: 104.1 MHz
- Branding: Mix 104.1

Programming
- Format: Adult contemporary
- Subchannels: HD2: ESPN Cleveland 101.3 (Sports)
- Affiliations: Fox News Radio; Motor Racing Network; Tennessee Titans Radio Network; Vol Network

Ownership
- Owner: Hartline, LLC
- Sister stations: WCLE

History
- First air date: August 1993
- Former call signs: WUSY
- Call sign meaning: Cleveland

Technical information
- Licensing authority: FCC
- Facility ID: 55099
- Class: A
- ERP: 2,200 watts
- HAAT: 159.0 meters (521.7 ft)
- Transmitter coordinates: 35°15′59.00″N 84°50′23.00″W
- Translator: HD2: 101.3 W267BI (Cleveland)

Links
- Public license information: Public file; LMS
- Webcast: Listen Live
- Website: mymix1041.com espncleveland1013.com (HD2)

WCLE-FM (104.1 FM, "Mix 104.1") is a radio station broadcasting an adult contemporary music format. Licensed to Calhoun, Tennessee, the station is currently owned by Hartline, LLC and features programming from Fox News Radio, Vol Network, Titans Radio Network, and Motor Racing Network.

Although the station is licensed to Calhoun, the transmitter is located on Candies Creek Ridge in the northern part of neighboring Bradley County, and the studios are located in Cleveland. Its sister station is WCLE-AM, with which it shares a studio.

WCLE-FM was originally established in 1961, signing on on August 1 of that year. The original station was the predecessor to modern WUSY. At first, the station was powered at 5,100 watts and only served the Cleveland area. WCLE-FM was also a daytimer and simulcast the AM's programming by day and continued broadcasting at night. The station switched to WUSY in 1981. WCLE-FM returned in September 1993, and describes itself as playing a mix of music from the 1970s, 1980s, and 1990s to the present.

== HD Radio ==
On June 3, 2024, WCLE-FM's HD2 subchannel changed their format from conservative talk (as "101.3 The Buzz") to sports, branded as "ESPN Cleveland 101.3" (simulcast on translator W267BI 101.3 FM Cleveland TN).

== Notable contributors ==
- Tom Rowland, former broadcaster, manager, and station owner who became mayor of Cleveland
