= WYWY =

Radio station in Barbourville, Kentucky, United States (1967–2026)

- Barbourville, Kentucky; United States
- Frequency: 950 kHz

Programming
- Format: Christian radio

Ownership
- Owner: Choice Radio Corporation
- Sister stations: WKKQ

History
- First air date: 1967
- Last air date: November 2026

Technical information
- Licensing authority: FCC
- Facility ID: 3953
- Class: D
- Power: 1,000 watts day; 52 watts night
- Transmitter coordinates: 36°50′28.3″N 83°52′21.7″W
- Translator: 93.3 W227CD (Barbourville)

Links
- Public license information: Public file; LMS

WYWY (950 AM) was a radio station licensed to Barbourville, Kentucky, United States. The station was owned by Choice Radio Corporation.

== History ==
The WYWY license was surrendered to the Federal Communications Commission in November 2026; at the time of the closure, the station had a Christian radio format. It was cancelled on November 12.
