= WVSA =

- Vernon, Alabama; United States
- Frequency: 1380 kHz
- Branding: 100.7 The Voice

Programming
- Format: Gospel

Ownership
- Owner: Lamar County Broadcasting Co.
- Sister stations: WJEC

History
- First air date: 1966
- Call sign meaning: Vernon and Sulligent, Alabama

Technical information
- Licensing authority: FCC
- Facility ID: 36453
- Class: D
- Power: 5,000 watts (day); 39 watts (night)
- Transmitter coordinates: 33°47′45″N 88°7′3″W
- Translator: 100.7 W264DD (Killen)

Links
- Public license information: Public file; LMS
- Website: wvsa1007.com

WVSA (1380 AM) is a radio station licensed to serve Vernon, Alabama. The station is owned by Lamar County Broadcasting Co. It once aired a Sports radio format. In May 2011 it was discovered the station had dropped ESPN for country music, while retaining all the area's high school sports. (Taken from Alabama Broadcast Media Page) By 2020 they flipped to Goapel

The station has been assigned the WVSA call letters by the Federal Communications Commission.

In the summer of 2016, the station acquired an FM translator, W237AQ out of Killen in the Shoals area. In the application for the move, no change of frequency will be requested; the translator will broadcast from a site northeast of Vernon, with 250 watts. (Taken From Alabama Broadcast Media Page) A license to cover for their new W264DD 100.7 FM relay was granted on September 19, 2016. (Taken from fccdata.org)
