= WGOL =

- Russellville, Alabama; United States
- Frequency: 920 kHz
- Branding: Real Country 920

Programming
- Format: Classic country

Ownership
- Owner: Pilati Investments Corp.
- Sister stations: WKAX

History
- First air date: May 29, 1949
- Former call signs: WWWR (1949–1987); WJRD (1987–1998)

Technical information
- Licensing authority: FCC
- Facility ID: 60506
- Class: D
- Power: 1,000 watts (day); 40 watts (night)
- Transmitter coordinates: 34°30′50″N 87°42′48″W

Links
- Public license information: Public file; LMS
- Webcast: Listen live
- Website: wgolam.com

WGOL (920 AM, "Real Country 920") is a radio station licensed to serve Russellville, Alabama, United States. The station is owned by Pilati Investments Corporation.

== Programming ==
WGOL broadcasts a Classic Country music format in C-QUAM AM Stereo.

In addition to its usual music programming, WGOL carries significant sports programming as a member of the Alabama Crimson Tide Sports Network. This includes Alabama Crimson Tide football, men's basketball, women's basketball, baseball, and the Hey Coach call-in show with Crimson Tide head coaches.

== History ==
This station first signed on in 1949 as WWWR.

WWWR made national headlines in early 1950 when a three-foot rattlesnake forced the radio station off the air for "more than an hour." Engineers discovered the snake had "crawled into the tuning unit, shorting the circuit."

In March 1986, SIS Sound of Russellville, Inc. reached an agreement to purchase WWWR from Franklin Broadcasting, Inc. The deal was approved by the Federal Communications Commission on June 4, 1986, and the transaction was consummated on October 28, 1986. The station's new owners had the FCC assign new call letters WJRD on August 17, 1987.

On November 15, 1997, William A. Grant Jr., the owner of WJRD license holder SIS Sound of Russellville, Inc., died. In March 1998, control of the company passed involuntarily to William A. Grant III and Walter B. Grant. The Federal Communications Commission approved this transfer on May 21, 1998, and it was formally consummated on the same day. The station was immediately put up for sale.

In June 1998, McCurry Broadcasting Company, Inc. reached an agreement to purchase WJRD from SIS Sound of Russellville, Inc. The deal was approved by the FCC on July 29, 1998, and the transaction was consummated on August 12, 1998. The new owners applied for and received new call letters WGOL from the FCC on August 17, 1998.

In December 1999, Wanda Patricia Underwood reached an agreement to purchase WGOL from McCurry Broadcasting Company, Inc. The deal was approved by the FCC on January 20, 2000, and the transaction was consummated on January 24, 2000.

In April 2005, Pilati Investments Corporation (Karl H. Pilati, president) reached an agreement to purchase WGOL from Wanda Patricia Underwood. The station sold for a reported $171,500. The FCC approved the deal on August 25, 2005, and the transaction was consummated on August 31, 2005.
