= WTRB =

- Ripley, Tennessee; United States
- Frequency: 1570 kHz
- Branding: Music Country

Programming
- Format: Country

Ownership
- Owner: WTRB, Inc.; (Palmer Johnson)
- Sister stations: WJPJ

Technical information
- Licensing authority: FCC
- Facility ID: 36689
- Class: D
- Power: 1,000 watts (day); 53 watts (night)
- Transmitter coordinates: 35°43′46″N 89°32′33″W
- Translator: 104.9 W285FL (Ripley)

Links
- Public license information: Public file; LMS
- Website: 1570wtrb.com

WTRB (1570 AM, "Music Country") is a radio station licensed to Ripley, Tennessee, United States, in Lauderdale County. The station is presently owned by WTRB, Inc. (Palmer Johnson, President) It airs a country music format.

The station went on the air December 11, 1954 and was assigned the "WTRB" call sign by the Federal Communications Commission.

== History ==
In March 1959, WTRB made national headlines when James W. Porter purchased fifteen minutes of air time on the station. Porter began his broadcast by shattering several records then leaving the station silent for the rest of the fifteen minutes after proposing a "National Can the Racket League" as a protest against rock'n'roll music.

Don Paris:

The late Don Paris started with WTRB when the station began broadcasting in 1954. Mr Paris had been the station manager until retiring in 2007 for health reasons.

== Ownership ==
In September 2004, West Tennessee Regional Broadcasting Inc. (Phillip Ennis, president) announced that they had reached an agreement to acquire WTRB from Williams Communications Inc. (Walton E. Williams Jr., president/director) for a reported sale price of $265,000. In August 2009 West Tennessee Regional Broadcasting reached an agreement to sell WTRB to Palmer Johnson, a Contract Broadcast Engineer from Kennett, MO.
