= WZOB =

- Fort Payne, Alabama; United States
- Frequency: 1250 kHz
- Branding: Number One Country 1250

Programming
- Format: Country

Ownership
- Owner: Central Broadcasting Company, Inc.

History
- First air date: July 2, 1950

Technical information
- Licensing authority: FCC
- Facility ID: 9797
- Class: D
- Power: 5000 watts (day); 122 watts (night)
- Transmitter coordinates: 34°26′23″N 85°45′12″W
- Translator: 100.9 W265DS (Fort Payne)

Links
- Public license information: Public file; LMS

WZOB (1250 AM, "Number One Country 1250") is a radio station licensed to serve Fort Payne, Alabama. It is owned by Central Broadcasting Company, Inc. and broadcasts country music format.

Originally owned by Glenn M. Gravitt, the station opened July 2, 1950. The call letters, WZOB, came from Zella Octavia Buttram, the daughter of Johnny Buttram (an advisor to Gravitt and brother of Pat Buttram, the well-known radio and TV comedian), and were requested from and assigned by the Federal Communications Commission.

The Louvin Brothers album Songs That Tell A Story is drawn from songs recorded live on a morning WZOB show in the 1950s.
