= WWTM =

- Decatur, Alabama; United States
- Broadcast area: Huntsville metropolitan area
- Frequency: 1390 kHz

Programming
- Format: Christian radio

Ownership
- Owner: Brantley Broadcast Associates, LLC

History
- First air date: 1935
- Former call signs: WMSL (1935–1987); WAVD (1987–2001)
- Former frequencies: 1400 kHz (1935-2025)
- Call sign meaning: "Team"

Technical information
- Licensing authority: FCC
- Facility ID: 54328
- Class: D
- Power: 350 watts day
- Transmitter coordinates: 34°36′44″N 86°59′28″W
- Translators: 94.3 W232DL (Decatur)); 97.3 W247AT (Harvest)

Links
- Public license information: Public file; LMS

WWTM (1390 AM) is a Christian radio station licensed to Decatur, Alabama, that serves Decatur, Huntsville, and the northwest Alabama region. The station is owned by Brantley Broadcast Associates, LLC.

== Former Programming ==
The station used to have almost all of its programming from ESPN Radio. Weekend programming from other providers included "Tee It Up" from Fourteenth Colony Productions. Weekend programming during the football season also included "NFL Preview", "NFL Insider" and "NCAA Football Insider" from Westwood One, plus "Pro Football Weekly" from Syndication Networks.

== History ==
The station started in 1935, as WMSL and was owned by Mutual Savings Life. Later owners included Frank Whisenant and Clete Quick. Under Whisenant, it acquired a sister television station, WMSL-TV (channel 23, now WAFF on channel 48 in Huntsville) and an FM sister (on 92.5 and 102.1, now WVNN-FM).

In March 1987, the call letters were changed to WAVD, which they remained until becoming WWTM, the current call sign, in June 2001.

Before becoming available for this station, the WWTM call letters were most recently otherwise assigned to a station in Worcester, Massachusetts, before it changed to WVEI in August 2000.

In May 2025, WWTM moved its frequency from 1400 kHz to 1390 kHz.
