= WZYX =

- Cowan, Tennessee; United States
- Frequency: 1440 kHz
- Branding: The Eagle

Programming
- Format: Adult hits

Ownership
- Owner: Christopher Thomas Wiseman; (Wiseman Media)

History
- First air date: 1957

Technical information
- Licensing authority: FCC
- Facility ID: 67170
- Class: D
- Power: 5,000 watts (day); 66 watts (night)
- Transmitter coordinates: 35°09′39″N 86°01′51″W
- Translators: 94.5 W233BN (Cowan); 95.3 W237DT (Cowan)

Links
- Public license information: Public file; LMS
- Webcast: Listen live
- Website: wzyxradio.net

WZYX (1440 AM) is a radio station that broadcasts an adult hits format branded as "The Eagle". It is licensed to Cowan, Tennessee, United States. The station is owned by Christopher Thomas Wiseman, through licensee Wiseman Media. WZYX Radio is broadcast over the AM dial at 1440, and over the FM dial via translators at 94.5 and 95.3, the only radio station providing local non-syndicated programing.

Staff includes Chris Wiseman, JT, Sue Fulmer, Keaton Solomon and Big Chuck.

Shows include Veterans Helping Veterans, Whats happening in Franklin County, and local coverage of Franklin County and Huntland Athletics.

The Noon hour is dedicated to school news, church news, chamber happenings, market news, etc. Higgle and Haggle airs at 12:45-1PM M-F.

Church Programming includes: 9:30 AM - International Gospel Hour - Jeff Archey 11:00 AM - First United Methodist Church Winchester Traditional Service

Franklin County's Most Powerful Station at 5000 watts.
