= WCLE (AM) =

Radio station in Tennessee

- Cleveland, Tennessee; United States
- Frequency: 1570 kHz
- Branding: Cleveland's Oldies 99.1

Programming
- Format: Oldies
- Affiliations: Fox News Radio

Ownership
- Owner: Santos Latin Media, Corp.
- Sister stations: WCLE-FM

History
- First air date: May 2, 1957; 69 years ago
- Call sign meaning: Cleveland

Technical information
- Licensing authority: FCC
- Facility ID: 55098
- Class: D
- Power: 5,000 watts (day); 84 watts (night)
- Transmitter coordinates: 35°10′55.00″N 84°50′55.00″W
- Translator: 99.1 W256DQ (Cleveland)

Links
- Public license information: Public file; LMS
- Webcast: Listen live
- Website: myoldies991.com

WCLE (1570 kHz) is a commercial radio station broadcasting an oldies radio format. Licensed to Cleveland, Tennessee, the station is owned by Hartline, LLC. The station also broadcasts on an FM translator, W256DQ 99.1 MHz, with a power of 250 watts.

Former logo

On September 1, 2019, the format of WCLE was changed from talk to Regional Mexican. It eventually switched back to talk.

On April 25, 2025, WCLE changed their format from talk to oldies, branded as "Cleveland's Oldies 99.1".

WCLE is a sister station to WCLE-FM, with which it shares a studio.

== Notable contributors ==
- Tom Rowland, former broadcaster, station manager, and owner who became mayor of Cleveland
