= WTID (FM) =

Radio station in Graceville, Florida

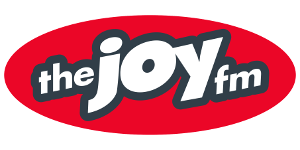
- Graceville, Florida; United States
- Broadcast area: Dothan, Alabama - Panama City, Florida
- Frequency: 101.7 MHz
- Branding: The Joy FM

Programming
- Format: Contemporary Christian

Ownership
- Owner: Radio Training Network, Inc.

History
- First air date: 1996
- Former call signs: WYDA (1991–2002); WTOT-FM (2002–2020)

Technical information
- Licensing authority: FCC
- Facility ID: 37510
- Class: A
- ERP: 6,000 watts
- HAAT: 100 meters (330 ft)
- Transmitter coordinates: 30°57′21.00″N 85°29′53.00″W

Links
- Public license information: Public file; LMS
- Webcast: Listen Live
- Website: alabama.thejoyfm.com

WTID (101.7 FM) is a Christian radio station licensed to Graceville, Florida, United States. It serves the Dothan, Alabama, area. The station is owned by Radio Training Network, Inc.

In May 2020, the then-WTOT-FM returned to the air with oldies. The call sign was changed to WTID, effectively swapping with 980 AM, on August 5, 2020.

In January 2022, WTID changed its format from oldies to contemporary Christian, branded as "The Joy FM".
