= WTLS =

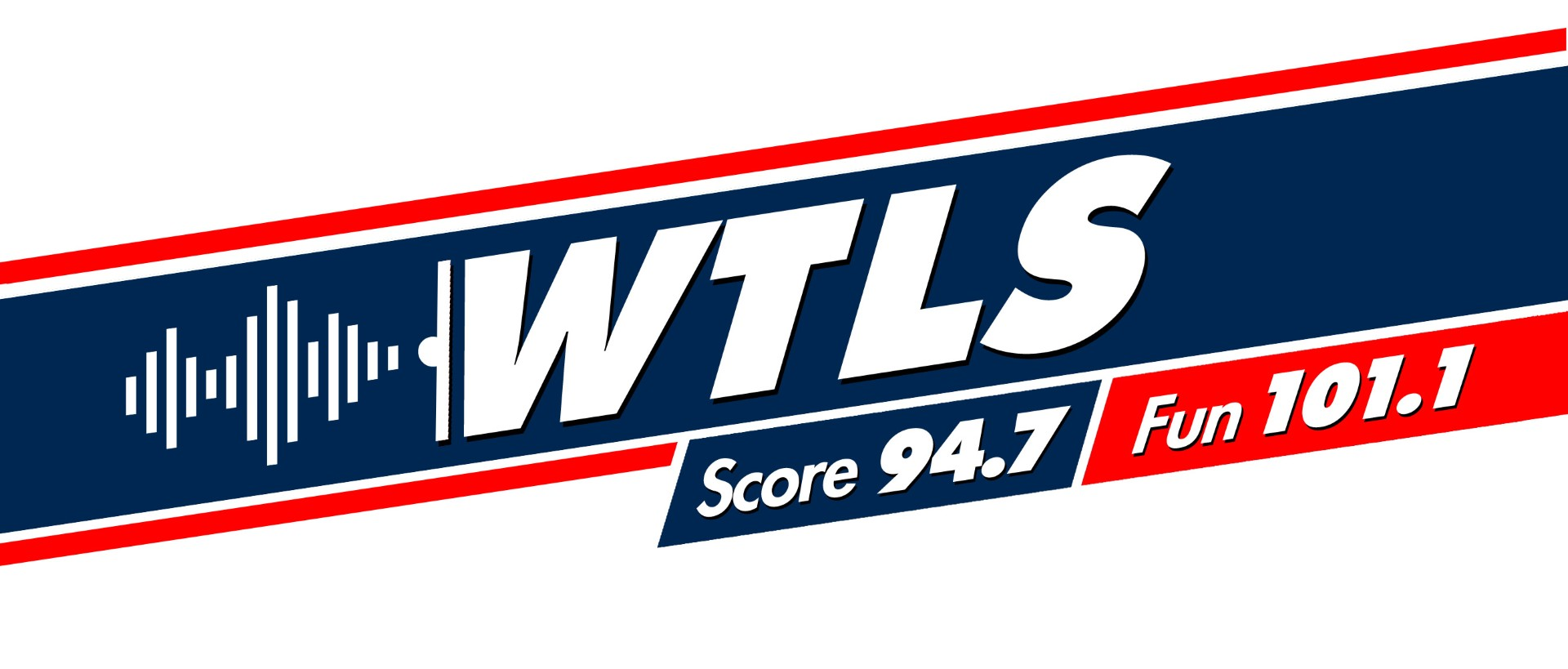
- Tallassee, Alabama; United States
- Frequency: 1300 kHz
- Branding: Score 94.7 & Fun 101.1

Programming
- Format: Talk/Sports/Classic Hits

Ownership
- Owner: Michael Butler Broadcasting. LLC

History
- First air date: 1954
- Call sign meaning: From Tallassee

Technical information
- Licensing authority: FCC
- Facility ID: 48011
- Class: D
- Power: 1200 watts (day); 18 watts (night)
- Transmitter coordinates: 32°30′39″N 85°53′33″W
- Translator: (94.7 MHz) W234DL (Tallassee)(101.1 MHz) W266DZ (Tallassee)

Links
- Public license information: Public file; LMS
- Webcast: Listen Live
- Website: 1300wtls.com

WTLS (1300 AM) is a radio station in Central Alabama, 30 miles northeast of Montgomery. The station broadcasts 24 hours a day. WTLS streams programming over the internet through its website.

== History ==
WTLS began broadcasting in 1954. The original owner was Bert Bank, former state senator and founder of the Alabama Radio Network; now the Crimson Tide Sports Network (CTSN), provider of University of Alabama sports broadcasts. The radio station's first engineer, Ned Butler, purchased the radio station from Bank in 1957. Butler put the first FM station in Tuscaloosa on the air for Bank in 1953. In addition, Butler built stations in Ozark, Luverne, and Talladega in the 1950s.

The WTLS station manager for decades was Betty Butler (Ned's wife). Betty also hosted a morning show, Coffee Time, which featured styrofoam puppets "Happy" & "Menace." Harold Shedd, original producer of the country music group, Alabama, worked for Butler in 1956. In 1970, Steve Butler (Ned's son), made WTLS the first All-Country radio station in Central Alabama.

Third generation broadcaster Michael Butler (Steve's son), took over the operation in 1999 after working as Program Director for a Montgomery radio group. Akin to the early days with Betty and Ned, Michael's wife Leigh Anne serves as WTLS station manager today.

== Programming ==
WTLS primarily has a talk/sports format, featuring a local morning show, The Wake-Up Call, with Michael, Trey Taylor, Phillip Nelson and Craig Vaught. The station also carries a Classic Hits format in the overnight hours.

Other popular programs include nationally syndicated talk show host Chris Plante and regional sports talk host Chuck Oliver. Local sportswriter Graham Dunn hosts River Region Sports. WTLS also broadcasts live play-by-play sports, including Alabama sports from the CTSN and Tallassee Tigers' high school sports. Broadcasts are on Spectrum Cable Public-access television cable TV Channel 340. All programming is streamed live on the WTLS website at and Tallassee Times TV on YouTube: Tallassee Times TV.

WTLS was the flagship station for the long-running program, Prep Sports Weekly, a statewide high school sports show with Doug Amos & Rick Cleveland that first aired in 1994. WTLS also has produced the regionally syndicated, In the Trenches, featuring former Alabama Crimson Tide center Roger Shultz and former Auburn Tigers quarterback Stan White. Yellowhammer Outdoors with Wes Allen, a daily production of WTLS, was also distributed throughout Alabama. In 2013, WTLS began producing the Lindy's Football Report, a weekly program airing on over 100 stations across the country.

One of the longest-running gospel music programs began in 1958 on WTLS, hosted by Johnny Fitzpatrick, featuring songs by the Swan Silvertones. "Gospel in the Morning-Time" continues with Charles Blalock as the host on Sunday mornings at 8:30. Blalock began working at WTLS in 1971 with the program, "The Gospel Train."

Michael Butler received the 2004 Greater Tallassee Area Chamber of Commerce "Business Person of the Year," award. WTLS was presented the Alabama Broadcasters Association "Station of the Year" in 2007.

In October 2007, WTLS began broadcasting on an FM translator at 106.5 FM (W293BK). WTLS was one of the first radio stations in the country authorized by the Federal Communications Commission to broadcast with this type of license. The broadcast facility is located in the Tallassee Industrial Park on the west bank of the Tallapoosa River.

In November 2011, WTLS erected a new 430-foot radio tower in West Tallassee to broadcast its FM signal. The FCC approved the upgrade in power to 250 watts for the translator. In December 2021, WTLS added a second translator (W243DL) in Pike Road on 94.7 FM. The FCC approved a move for the 106.5 translator frequency to 106.9 FM (W295DL) in April 2022. The AM frequency continues to be transmitted from the studio site.
