= WEIS (AM) =

- Centre, Alabama; United States
- Broadcast area: Anniston, Alabama
- Frequency: 990 kHz

Programming
- Format: Country/Southern Gospel

Ownership
- Owner: Baker Enterprises, Inc.

History
- First air date: December 28, 1961
- Call sign meaning: Weiss Lake

Technical information
- Licensing authority: FCC
- Facility ID: 3619
- Class: D
- Power: 1000 watts (day); 30 watts (night)
- Transmitter coordinates: 34°09′10″N 85°40′44″W
- Translator: 100.5 W263BW (Centre)

Links
- Public license information: Public file; LMS
- Webcast: Listen live
- Website: weisradio.com

WEIS (990 AM and FM translator W263BW 100.5 FM) is an American radio station licensed to the community of Centre, Alabama. The station serves the Gadsden, Alabama and Anniston, Alabama, area. The station is owned by Baker Enterprises, Inc. It airs a country music format during the day and Southern Gospel music at night and all day on Sunday. In addition to its music programming, WEIS broadcasts news updates all day plus Atlanta Braves baseball, Auburn Tigers football, Alabama Crimson Tide football and daily Weiss Lake fishing reports.

The station was assigned the "WEIS" call sign by the Federal Communications Commission (FCC).

Broadcast translator for WEIS
Call sign	Frequency	City of license	FID	ERP (W)	HAAT	Class	FCC info
W263BW	100.5 FM	Centre, Alabama	146728	60	289 m (948 ft)	D	LMS
