= WLAQ =

Radio station in Rome, Georgia

- Rome, Georgia; United States
- Broadcast area: Rome metropolitan area, Georgia
- Frequency: 1410 kHz
- Branding: AM 1410

Programming
- Format: News Talk Information
- Affiliations: CBS News Radio; Premiere Networks; Townhall News; Westwood One

Ownership
- Owner: Cripple Creek Broadcasting Company

Technical information
- Licensing authority: FCC
- Facility ID: 14502
- Class: B
- Power: 1,000 watts
- Transmitter coordinates: 34°15′43.00″N 85°12′22.00″W
- Translator: 96.9 W245DG (Rome)

Links
- Public license information: Public file; LMS
- Webcast: Listen Live
- Website: wlaq1410.com

WLAQ (1410 AM) is a radio station broadcasting a News Talk Information format. Licensed to Rome, Georgia, United States, the station was first licensed on May 4, 1947 and serves the Rome area. The station is currently owned by Cripple Creek Broadcasting Company and features programming from CBS News Radio, Premiere Networks, and Westwood One.

WLAQ currently provides a locally produced morning news/talk/sports program hosted by News Director Elizabeth Davis, as well as a great deal of local varsity sports coverage. WLAQ and its sister station WATG 95.7 FM The Ridge are flagship stations for coverage of the Rome Braves, Class A affiliate of the major league Atlanta Braves. Son of legendary Braves voice Skip Caray, Josh Caray, provided the play-by-play for the 2007 and 2008 seasons, now handled by Rome native Ben Poplin. Other sports coverage is provided by station principals Randy Davis, Matt Davis, and numerous other local sports watchers.

WLAQ's daily syndicated programming includes the Glenn Beck Program, Rush Limbaugh, Dave Ramsey, and continuous coverage through the night from ESPN Radio. The station also carries NASCAR coverage from the Motor Racing Network and Georgia Tech basketball and football.

Glenn Beck premiered on WLAQ in the 9 AM to noon time slot in September 2008, after decades of that time slot being filled by regionally syndicated talk-radio mainstay Ludlow Porch.

Logo before translator sign on
