= WPNN =

- Pensacola, Florida; United States
- Broadcast area: Pensacola and Vicinity
- Frequency: 790 kHz
- Branding: Pensacola's Information Station 103.7 FM/790AM

Programming
- Format: Talk radio
- Affiliations: ABC News Radio; New Orleans Pelicans; New Orleans Saints

Ownership
- Owner: Miracle Radio; (Miracle Radio, Inc.)
- Sister stations: WBSR

History
- First air date: October 1956
- Former call signs: WPFA (1955–1990); WSWL (1990–2002)
- Call sign meaning: Pensacola's News

Technical information
- Licensing authority: FCC
- Facility ID: 43135
- Class: D
- Power: 1,000 watts (day); 66 watts (night)
- Transmitter coordinates: 30°27′10″N 87°14′26″W
- Translator: 103.7 W279CY (Pensacola)

Links
- Public license information: Public file; LMS
- Webcast: Listen live
- Website: talk103fm.com

WPNN (790 AM) is a commercial radio station licensed to Pensacola, Florida, United States. Owned by Miracle Radio, it features a talk format. The radio studios and transmitter are on North Pace Boulevard at Kelly Avenue in Pensacola. WPNN also carries New Orleans Pelicans basketball games and some local high school sports.

WPNN is also heard over low-power FM translator W279CY at 103.7 MHz.

== History ==
The original call sign was WPFA, standing for Pensacola, Florida. Owner J. William O'Connor received a construction permit from the Federal Communications Commission (FCC) in 1955 for a new station at 790 kilocycles. O'Connor also had a construction permit to construct television station WPFA-TV.

WPFA signed on the air in October 1956. It was a daytimer, powered at 1,000 watts but required to go off the air at sunset. WPFA was a rare radio station in that era to have a female program director, Barbara Holt. O'Connor sold the station in 1958 to Edwin H. Estes but remained as the general manager.

For most of the 1960s, 70s and 80s, WPNN had a country music format. In 1990, the station switched its call letters to WSWL. As music listening moved to the FM dial, WSWL tried an all news radio format, largely provided by CNN Headline News, though it also would simulcast newscasts from WEAR-TV on weeknights. In 2002, it changed its call sign to WPNN and later switched to an all-talk format.

In February 2016 the station acquired a move-in FM translator from Carrabelle, Florida, as part of the AM Revitalization project approved by the FCC. It began transmitting on 103.7 MHz (W279CY) in early April 2016. (Taken from Alabama Broadcast Media Page)
