= WTOE =

- Spruce Pine, North Carolina; United States
- Frequency: 1470 kHz
- Branding: WTOE 101.1 FM 1470 AM

Programming
- Format: Oldies
- Affiliations: ABC News Radio

Ownership
- Owner: Mountain Valley Media, Inc.

History
- First air date: December 25, 1955
- Call sign meaning: North TOE River

Technical information
- Licensing authority: FCC
- Facility ID: 46322
- Class: D
- Power: 5,000 watts day 103 watts night
- Transmitter coordinates: 35°54′24″N 82°06′21″W
- Translator: 101.1 W266DO (Spruce Pine)

Links
- Public license information: Public file; LMS
- Webcast: Listen Live
- Website: wtoe.com

WTOE (1470 AM) is a radio station broadcasting an oldies format. It is licensed to and serves Spruce Pine, North Carolina, U.S. area. The station is currently owned by Mountain Valley Media, Inc.

== History ==
WTOE signed on Christmas Eve 1955. The Sink family, owners of WKYK, have owned WTOE since September 1991.

WTOE is not to be confused with WTOE 5 News, a satirical fake news website.
