= WJEC (FM) =

- Vernon, Alabama; United States
- Frequency: 106.5 MHz

Programming
- Format: Southern Gospel

Ownership
- Owner: Lamar County Broadcasting Co., Inc.
- Sister stations: WVSA

History
- First air date: 1994
- Call sign meaning: W Jesus Christ

Technical information
- Licensing authority: FCC
- Facility ID: 36451
- Class: A
- ERP: 6,000 watts
- HAAT: 100 meters (328 feet)
- Transmitter coordinates: 33°51′15″N 88°1′55″W

Links
- Public license information: Public file; LMS
- Webcast: Listen Live
- Website: wjec1065.com

WJEC (106.5 FM) is a radio station licensed to serve Vernon, Alabama, United States. The station, which began broadcasting in 1994, is currently owned by Lamar County Broadcasting Co., Inc.

WJEC broadcasts Classic Country and WVSA broadcast Southern Gospel music format.

== History ==
This station received its original construction permit for a 3,000-watt station at 106.5 MHz from the Federal Communications Commission on August 16, 1989. The new station was assigned the call letters WJEC by the FCC on September 20, 1989. After a modification to increase the station's effective radiated power to 6,000 watts and one time extension, WJEC received its license to cover from the FCC on August 10, 1994.

In April 1996, an agreement was reached to transfer the broadcast license for WJEC to Lamar County Broadcasting Co., Inc., an Alabama corporation. The deal was approved by the FCC on July 2, 1996, and the transaction was consummated on July 16, 1996.
