= WASC (AM) =

- Spartanburg, South Carolina; United States
- Broadcast area: Spartanburg, South Carolina
- Frequency: 1530 AM

Programming
- Format: Urban Oldies

Ownership
- Owner: New South Broadcasting Corporation

History
- First air date: January 15, 1968

Technical information
- Licensing authority: FCC
- Facility ID: 48629
- Class: D
- Power: 1,000 watts day 250 watts critical hours
- Transmitter coordinates: 34°56′58.00″N 81°57′33.00″W

Links
- Public license information: Public file; LMS

WASC (1530 AM) is a daytime-only American radio station located in Spartanburg, South Carolina. The station is licensed by the Federal Communications Commission (FCC) to broadcast on 1530 AM.

== History ==
In 1985, WASC attempted to move to 760 AM. However, when the FCC granted WCIS in Morganton, North Carolina, a license to broadcast on 760 AM, they also denied WASC's attempt to change frequencies.
