= WTOT (AM) =

- Marianna, Florida; United States
- Frequency: 980 kHz
- Branding: Oldies 102.1

Programming
- Format: Oldies

Ownership
- Owner: MFR, Inc.

History
- First air date: 1958
- Last air date: May 2023
- Former call signs: WTOT (1958–2020); WTID (June–August 2020)

Technical information
- Licensing authority: FCC
- Facility ID: 6751
- Class: B
- Power: 1,000 watts day; 340 watts night
- Transmitter coordinates: 30°47′1.7″N 85°15′17.7″W
- Translator: 102.1 W271DM (Marianna)

Links
- Public license information: Public file; LMS

WTOT (980 AM) was an American commercial radio station licensed by the FCC to serve the community of Marianna, Florida. WTOT was owned by MFR, Inc.

== History ==
According to a string of Federal Communications Commission (FCC) filings (many of which were dismissed - see the FCC link below), this station had been silent or operating at reduced power since 2006, due to burned-out tubes, and an inability to replace the transmitter until they received proceeds from a lawsuit. The most recent request to extend the operations at reduced power had not been approved by the FCC.

In August 2008, Ed Cearley III - the general manager, president and part owner of the station - was found dead in his home, having died from natural causes, according to police.

On May 1, 2015 (after being silent for four months), WTOT returned to the air with an urban contemporary format.

On January 15, 2016, WTOT went silent. On January 2, 2017, WTOT returned to the air simulcasting oldies-formatted WTOT-FM 101.7 Graceville.

On February 7, 2017, their single tower collapsed due to high winds. They were expected to return to the air within two weeks.

On March 12, 2017, WTOT returned to the air with oldies.

On June 11, 2020, WTOT changed their call letters to WTID; the call sign change was undone on August 5, 2020.

The FCC cancelled the station’s license on November 21, 2024, as it had not operated since May 2023.
