= WTNK =

- Hartsville, Tennessee; United States
- Frequency: 1090 kHz
- Branding: Fun Radio 93.5 93.9

Programming
- Format: Classic hits

Ownership
- Owner: Steve Sudbury and Louis M. Anzek; (Fun Media Group of Tennessee, LLC)

History
- First air date: 1966 (as WJKM)
- Former call signs: WJKM (1966–2003)

Technical information
- Licensing authority: FCC
- Facility ID: 5862
- Class: D
- Power: 1,000 watts day 2 watts night
- Transmitter coordinates: 36°23′17.00″N 86°9′55.00″W
- Translators: 93.5 W228CB (Hartsville); 93.9 W230CV (Hartsville)

Links
- Public license information: Public file; LMS
- Webcast: Listen live
- Website: funradiotn.com

WTNK (1090 AM) is a radio station broadcasting a classic hits format. It operates on 1090 kHz in the AM broadcast band with 1000 watts during the day and 2 watts at night. WTNK utilizes two translators on 93.5 MHz and 93.9 MHz, both with 250 watts ERP. Licensed to Hartsville, Tennessee, United States, the station is currently owned by Steve Sudbury and Louis M. Anzek, through licensee Fun Media Group of Tennessee, LLC. The station's studios and transmitters are located on Marlene Street.

The station featured a country music format until December 2015.
