= Cowan, Tennessee =

- City
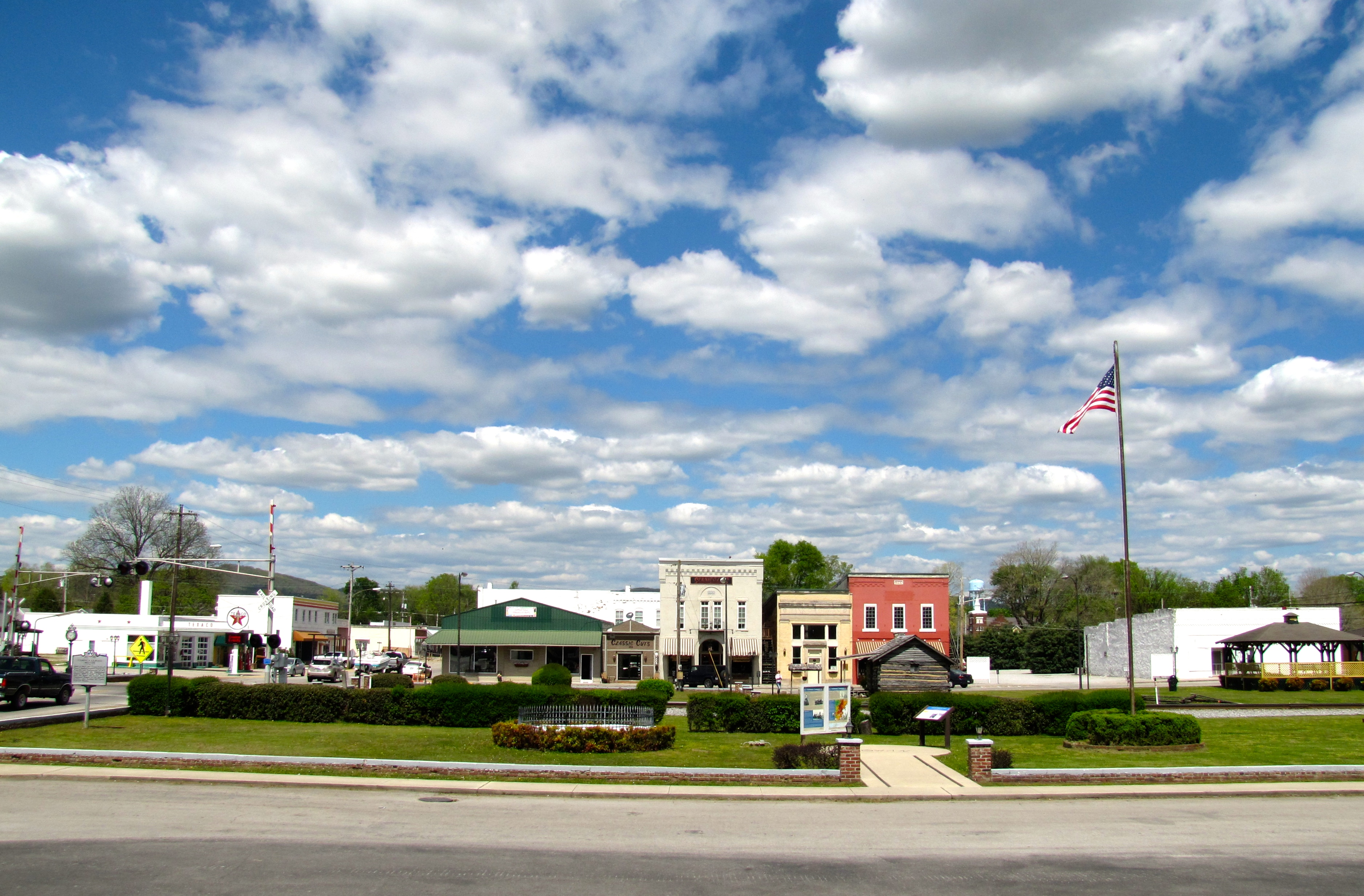
- Businesses along Tennessee Avenue

- Location of Cowan in Franklin County, Tennessee.
- Coordinates: 35°10′0″N 86°0′43″W
- Country: United States
- State: Tennessee
- County: Franklin

Area
  - Total: 2.08 sq mi (5.38 km^{2})
  - Land: 2.08 sq mi (5.38 km^{2})
  - Water: 0 sq mi (0.00 km^{2})
- Elevation: 974 ft (297 m)

Population (2020)
  - Total: 1,759
  - Density: 846.5/sq mi (326.84/km^{2})
- Time zone: UTC-6 (Central (CST))
  - Summer (DST): UTC-5 (CDT)
- ZIP code: 37318
- Area code: 931
- FIPS code: 47-17700
- GNIS feature ID: 1306151
- Website: www.cityofcowan.com

Cowan is a city in Franklin County, Tennessee, United States. As of the 2020 census, Cowan had a population of 1,759. It is part of the Tullahoma, Tennessee Micropolitan Statistical Area.

== History ==
The earliest settlers arrived in the Cowan area in the late 18th and early 19th centuries. The home of one such settler, William Russell, served as the Franklin County Courthouse until the establishment of Winchester in 1810.

The town of Cowan dates from the mid-19th century and developed mostly as a railroad town. It was the site where several branch lines met the main Nashville to Chattanooga trunk of the Nashville, Chattanooga and St. Louis Railway which ran through the important Cowan Tunnel. As the last stop before the uphill climb onto the nearby Cumberland Plateau, pusher engines to assist trains in making the steep ascent were based there, and are still in use today.

The town's economy declined with the importance of the railroad after U.S. Route 41A was built in the 1940s. The old passenger depot, built in 1904, was restored as a museum, and is a focal point of the downtown area.

== Geography ==
Cowan is situated at the western base of the Cumberland Plateau, and is concentrated around the point where U.S. Route 41A crosses the CSX railroad tracks. The edge of the Plateau juts out in a series of ridges creating several small valleys in the area, including Hawkins Cove to the northeast and Keith Cove to the south. Cowan is drained by Boiling Fork Creek, a tributary of the Elk River.

US 41A (Cumberland Street) is the primary road in Cowan, connecting the city with Winchester and the Tims Ford Lake area to the west. To the east of Cowan, US 41A ascends nearly 1,000 feet (300 m) to the top of the Cumberland Plateau, where it passes through Sewanee and Monteagle.

According to the United States Census Bureau, the city has a total area of 2.0 square miles (5.2 km^{2}), all land.

=== Climate ===
Climate data for Cowan, Tennessee (1991–2020 normals, extremes 1985–2023)
Month	Jan	Feb	Mar	Apr	May	Jun	Jul	Aug	Sep	Oct	Nov	Dec	Year
Record high °F (°C)	77 (25)	80 (27)	85 (29)	89 (32)	95 (35)	104 (40)	105 (41)	103 (39)	99 (37)	94 (34)	86 (30)	76 (24)	105 (41)
Mean daily maximum °F (°C)	48.9 (9.4)	53.1 (11.7)	61.4 (16.3)	70.8 (21.6)	78.1 (25.6)	84.6 (29.2)	87.3 (30.7)	87.1 (30.6)	82.0 (27.8)	72.0 (22.2)	60.5 (15.8)	51.8 (11.0)	69.8 (21.0)
Daily mean °F (°C)	39.5 (4.2)	43.1 (6.2)	50.5 (10.3)	59.1 (15.1)	67.1 (19.5)	74.4 (23.6)	77.6 (25.3)	76.8 (24.9)	71.0 (21.7)	60.2 (15.7)	49.2 (9.6)	42.4 (5.8)	59.2 (15.1)
Mean daily minimum °F (°C)	30.2 (−1.0)	33.1 (0.6)	39.7 (4.3)	47.4 (8.6)	56.1 (13.4)	64.1 (17.8)	67.9 (19.9)	66.4 (19.1)	60.0 (15.6)	48.5 (9.2)	38.0 (3.3)	33.1 (0.6)	48.7 (9.3)
Record low °F (°C)	−2 (−19)	4 (−16)	8 (−13)	22 (−6)	31 (−1)	44 (7)	52 (11)	48 (9)	36 (2)	23 (−5)	13 (−11)	−5 (−21)	−5 (−21)
Average precipitation inches (mm)	4.78 (121)	5.40 (137)	5.76 (146)	5.06 (129)	4.77 (121)	5.20 (132)	4.68 (119)	3.91 (99)	4.27 (108)	3.43 (87)	4.66 (118)	5.75 (146)	57.67 (1,465)
Average snowfall inches (cm)	1.4 (3.6)	1.0 (2.5)	1.0 (2.5)	0.0 (0.0)	0.0 (0.0)	0.0 (0.0)	0.0 (0.0)	0.0 (0.0)	0.0 (0.0)	0.0 (0.0)	0.0 (0.0)	0.7 (1.8)	4.1 (10)
Average precipitation days (≥ 0.01 in)	11.5	11.9	12.0	10.8	11.3	12.1	11.2	9.7	7.9	8.0	9.4	12.4	128.2
Average snowy days (≥ 0.1 in)	1.1	1.3	0.7	0.0	0.0	0.0	0.0	0.0	0.0	0.0	0.0	0.6	3.7
Source: NOAA

== Demographics ==
Historical population
Census	Pop.	Note	%±
1880	222		—
1890	624		181.1%
1930	1,367		—
1940	1,461		6.9%
1950	1,835		25.6%
1960	1,979		7.8%
1970	1,772		−10.5%
1980	1,790		1.0%
1990	1,738		−2.9%
2000	1,770		1.8%
2010	1,737		−1.9%
2020	1,759		1.3%

=== 2020 census ===
As of the 2020 census, Cowan had a population of 1,759, 750 households, and 341 families residing in the city.

The median age was 43.1 years. 21.9% of residents were under the age of 18 and 20.9% of residents were 65 years of age or older. For every 100 females there were 90.0 males, and for every 100 females age 18 and over there were 86.9 males age 18 and over.

90.1% of residents lived in urban areas, while 9.9% lived in rural areas.

There were 750 households in Cowan, of which 26.7% had children under the age of 18 living in them. Of all households, 36.8% were married-couple households, 20.9% were households with a male householder and no spouse or partner present, and 35.6% were households with a female householder and no spouse or partner present. About 34.1% of all households were made up of individuals and 15.0% had someone living alone who was 65 years of age or older.

There were 857 housing units, of which 12.5% were vacant. The homeowner vacancy rate was 2.3% and the rental vacancy rate was 7.1%.

Racial composition as of the 2020 census
Race	Number	Percent
White	1,484	84.4%
Black or African American	144	8.2%
American Indian and Alaska Native	3	0.2%
Asian	3	0.2%
Native Hawaiian and Other Pacific Islander	0	0.0%
Some other race	18	1.0%
Two or more races	107	6.1%
Hispanic or Latino (of any race)	42	2.4%

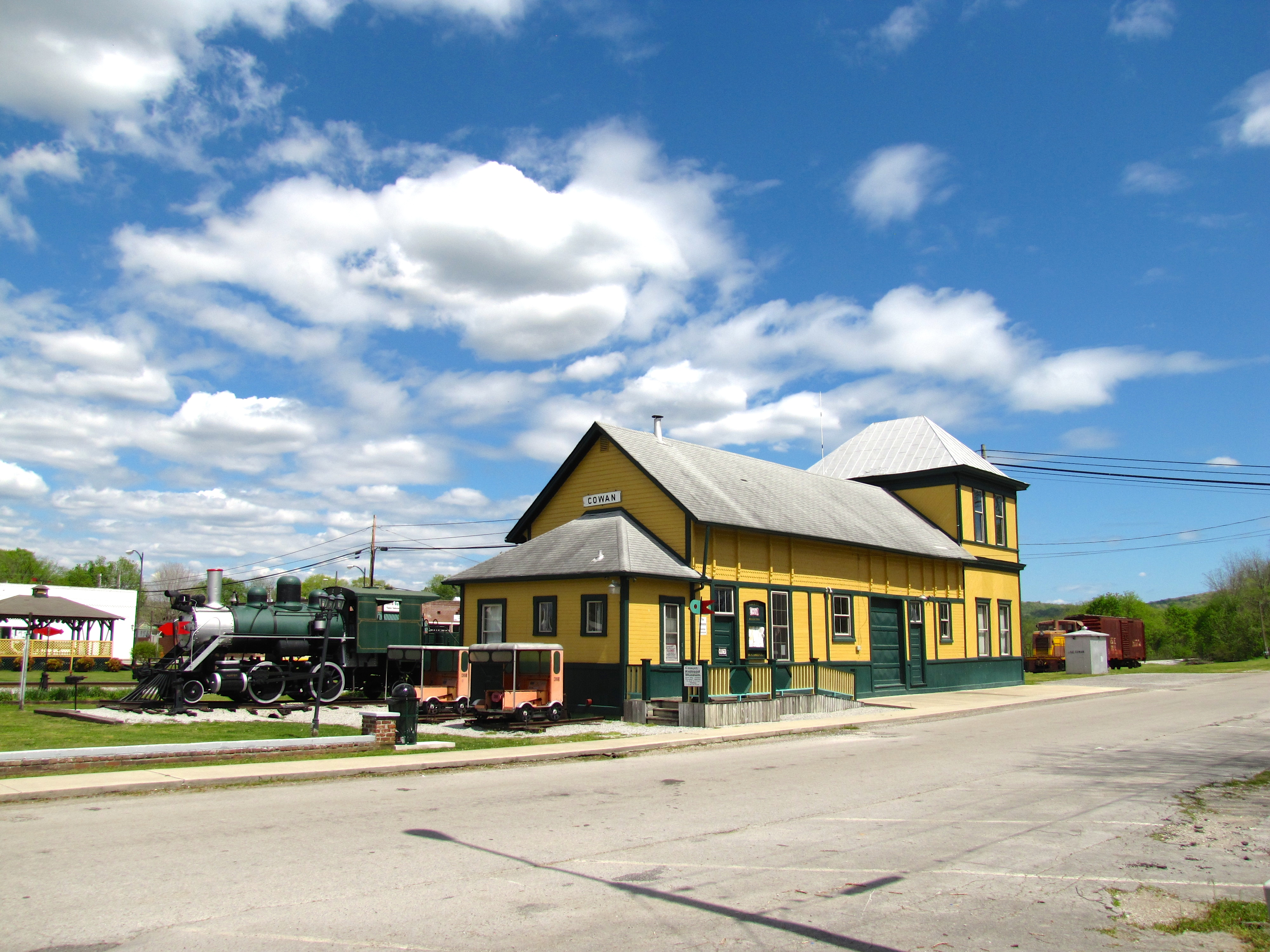
Cowan Railroad Museum

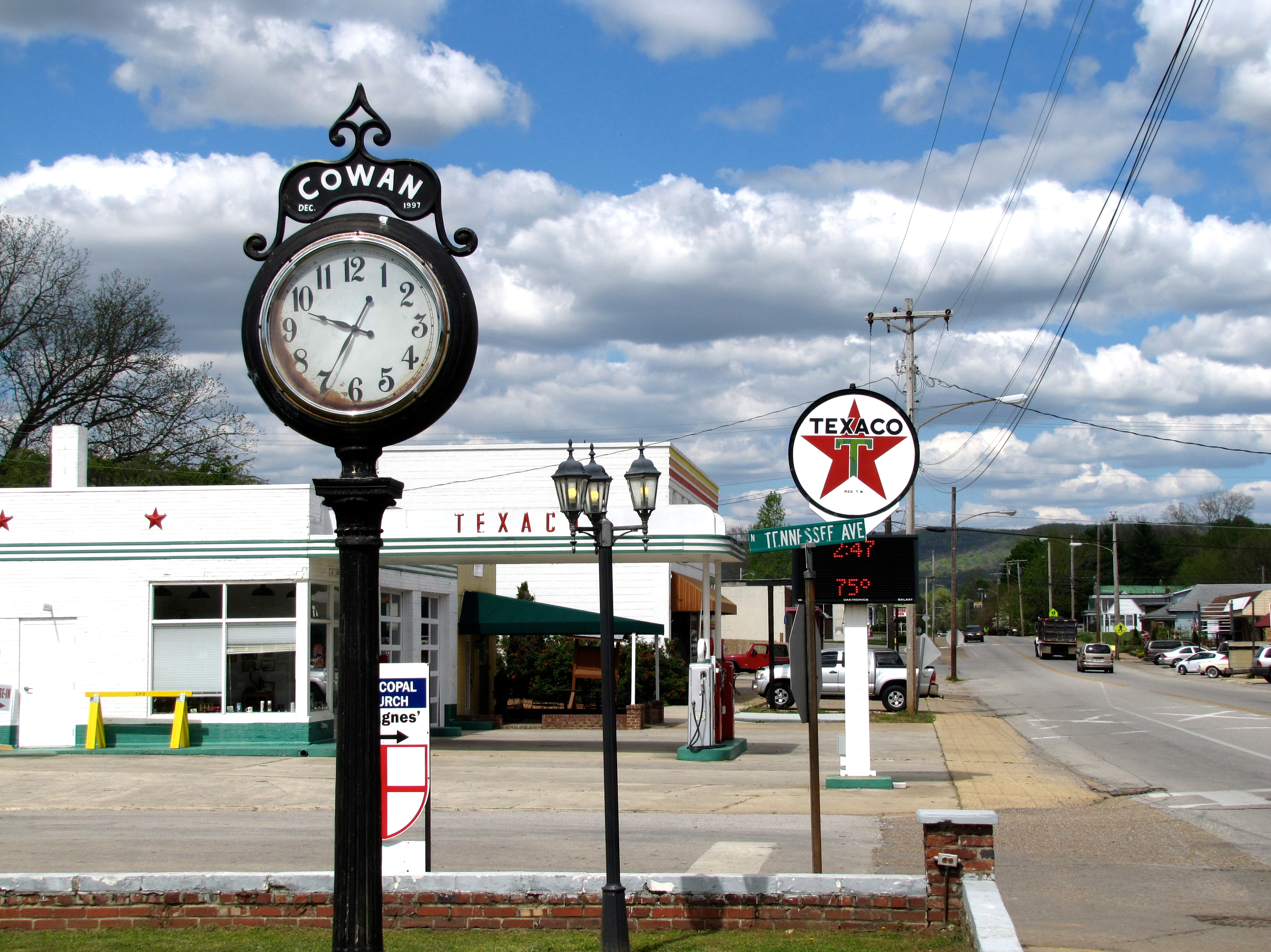
Street clock and Texaco station along US 41A in Cowan

=== 2000 census ===
As of the census of 2000, there was a population of 1,770, with 746 households and 499 families residing in the city. The population density was 895.6 inhabitants per square mile (345.8/km^{2}). There were 803 housing units at an average density of 406.3 per square mile (156.9/km^{2}). The racial makeup of the city was 87.68% White, 9.44% African American, 0.17% Native American, 0.00% Asian, 0.79% from other races, and 1.92% from two or more races. Hispanic or Latino of any race were 1.36% of the population.

There were 746 households, out of which 30.8% had children under the age of 18 living with them, 46.6% were married couples living together, 16.4% had a female householder with no husband present, and 33.0% were non-families. 31.4% of all households were made up of individuals, and 14.3% had someone living alone who was 65 years of age or older. The average household size was 2.36 and the average family size was 2.95.

In the city, the population was spread out, with 24.7% under the age of 18, 8.5% from 18 to 24, 25.6% from 25 to 44, 22.7% from 45 to 64, and 18.5% who were 65 years of age or older. The median age was 39 years. For every 100 females, there were 86.3 males. For every 100 females age 18 and over, there were 84.2 males.

The median income for a household in the city was $27,448, and the median income for a family was $33,882. Males had a median income of $27,321 versus $20,909 for females. The per capita income for the city was $18,352. About 13.4% of families and 16.7% of the population were below the poverty line, including 22.8% of those under the age of 18 and 11.4% of those 65 and older.

== Notable people ==
- Jauan Jennings, former University of Tennessee and San Francisco 49ers wide receiver
