= WLIV =

WLIV may refer to:

- WLIV (AM), a radio station (920 AM) licensed to serve Livingston, Tennessee, United States
- WUCH, a radio station (96.9 FM) licensed to serve Monterey, Tennessee, which held the call sign WLIV-FM from 1996 to 2021
- WLQK, a radio station (95.9 FM) licensed to serve Livingston, Tennessee, which held the call sign WLIV-FM from 1968 to 1981
