= WUCH =

- Algood, Tennessee; United States
- Broadcast area: Cookeville, Tennessee
- Frequency: 96.9 MHz
- Branding: Highway 111 Country 96.9

Programming
- Format: Classic country
- Affiliations: Westwood One, Fox News Radio, Motor Racing Network

Ownership
- Owner: Larry Stone; (Stonecom Cookeville, LLC)
- Sister stations: WBXE, WKXD-FM, WLIV, WLQK, WUCT

History
- First air date: 1996 (as WLIV-FM at 104.7)
- Former call signs: WLIV-FM (1996–2021)
- Former frequencies: 104.7 MHz (1996–2021)

Technical information
- Licensing authority: FCC
- Facility ID: 57190
- Class: A
- ERP: 1,500 watts
- HAAT: 201 meters (659 ft)
- Transmitter coordinates: 36°11′03.00″N 85°24′41.00″W

Links
- Public license information: Public file; LMS
- Webcast: Listen live
- Website: 111country.com

WUCH (96.9 FM) is a radio station broadcasting a classic country music format. Licensed to Algood, Tennessee, United States, the station serves the Cookeville area. The station is currently owned by Larry Stone, through licensee Stonecom Cookeville, LLC, and features programming from Westwood One, Fox News Radio, and Motor Racing Network.

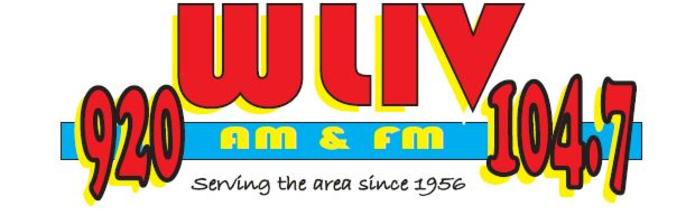
Former logo

In September 2021, WUCH launched a classic country format, branded as "Highway 111 Country 96.9".
