= WKXD-FM =

- Monterey, Tennessee; United States
- Broadcast area: Cookeville, Tennessee
- Frequency: 106.9 MHz (HD Radio)
- Branding: 106.9 Kicks Country

Programming
- Format: Country
- Subchannels: HD1: WKXD-FM analog HD2: 93.3 The Dawg (Classic hip hop); HD3: Sportsradio 104.7 (Sports)
- Affiliations: Compass Media Networks; United Stations Radio Networks; Westwood One; Performance Racing Network; Tennessee Titans Radio Network

Ownership
- Owner: Stonecom Cookeville, LLC
- Sister stations: WBXE, WLIV, WLQK, WUCH, WUCT

History
- First air date: 1989 (as WRJT)
- Former call signs: WMCZ (1985–1986, CP); WRJT (1986–1991)

Technical information
- Licensing authority: FCC
- Facility ID: 31387
- Class: C2
- ERP: 23,000 watts
- HAAT: 224 meters (735 ft)
- Transmitter coordinates: 36°7′13.00″N 85°14′44.00″W
- Translators: HD2: 93.3 W227EC (Cookeville); HD3: 104.7 W284DR (Cookeville)

Links
- Public license information: Public file; LMS
- Webcast: Listen Live; HD2: Listen Live; HD3: Listen Live
- Website: 1069kickscountry.com 933thedawg.com (HD2) sportsradio1047.com (HD3)

WKXD-FM (106.9 MHz, "106.9 Kicks Country") is a radio station broadcasting a country music format. Licensed to Monterey, Tennessee, United States, the station is currently owned by Stonecom.

== History ==
The Federal Communications Commission issued a construction permit for the station on September 10, 1985. The station was assigned the call sign WMCZ on December 3, 1985, and, on January 9, 1986, changed its call sign to WRJT. The station received its license to cover on August 2, 1989. On October 31, 1991, the station again changed its call sign to the current WKXD-FM. July 9, 2012 at 9 am WKXD flipped from hot adult contemporary to country.

Until 2012, WKXD-FM was relayed on translator station 100.9 FM in Cookeville. W265BC is now W231DG and carries the programming of WUCT (1600 AM).

== HD Radio ==
In July 2021, WKXD-FM began broadcasting in the HD Radio format. 93.3 The Dawg began broadcasting on July 8, 2021, on the HD2 subchannel with classic hip-hop.

On October 14, 2021, WKXD-FM launched a sports format on its HD3 subchannel, branded as "Sportsradio 104.7" (simulcast on translator W284DR 104.7 FM Cookeville).
