= Steel City Jug Slammers =

US musical group

- Origin: Birmingham, Alabama, U.S.
- Genres: Folk; country; Americana; blues
- Years active: 2014–present
- Members: Ramblin' Ricky Tate; Washtub Jay; Jerrod Atkins; Corey Medders; Steven Bate
- Past members: GW Henderson; Derek Stack; Anthony Sutton; Zac Peoples
- Website: www.steelcityjugslammers.com

Steel City Jug Slammers are an American jug band from Birmingham, Alabama. Active members include Ramblin' Ricky Tate, Jerrod Atkins, Corey Medders, Steven Bate and Jacob Mathews.

== History ==
Founded in 2012.

Steel City Jug Slammers released their Self-titled debut album in 2014.

The band's second album "Tall Tales" was released in 2018.

"Hot Butter" the band's third studio album was released in fall of 2019.

== Performance ==
The Jug Slammers have been featured on the National Jug Band Jubilee. The band also won the 2015 Minneapolis Battle of the Jug Bands.

=== Radio and television ===
The band has been featured on Animal Planet's Pit Bulls & Parolees and NPR's A Prairie Home Companion. The band was also featured by Jerry Springer on his podcast.

=== Film ===
Steel City Jug Slammers have appeared in documentary films including Jug Band Hokum and If You Don't Love It Change it.

== Discography ==
- Save My Soul (Demo)
- Self- Titled (Full length)
- The Earnest Tube Sessions (Compilation)
- Live at the Uptown Ramblers Club (Live album)
- The Earnest Tube Sessions Vol. 2 (Compilation)
- Tall Tales (Full Length)
