= WLIV (AM) =

- Livingston, Tennessee; United States
- Broadcast area: Cookeville
- Frequency: 920 kHz

Programming
- Format: Country
- Affiliations: CNN Radio, Dial Global, Talk Radio Network

Ownership
- Owner: Stonecom Cookeville, LLC; (Stonecom Cookeville, LLC)
- Sister stations: WBXE, WKXD-FM, WLQK, WUCH, WUCT

History
- Call sign meaning: W LIVingston

Technical information
- Licensing authority: FCC
- Facility ID: 70520
- Class: D
- Power: 1,000 watts day 38 watts night
- Transmitter coordinates: 36°22′28.00″N 85°18′20.00″W
- Translator: 101.9 W270DD (Livingston)

Links
- Public license information: Public file; LMS
- Website: theucnow.com/station/101-9-wliv

WLIV (920 kHz) is an AM radio station broadcasting a country music format. Licensed to Livingston, Tennessee, United States, the station serves the Cookeville area. The station is currently owned by Larry Stone, through licensee Stonecom Cookeville, LLC, and features programming from CNN Radio, Dial Global, and Talk Radio Network.

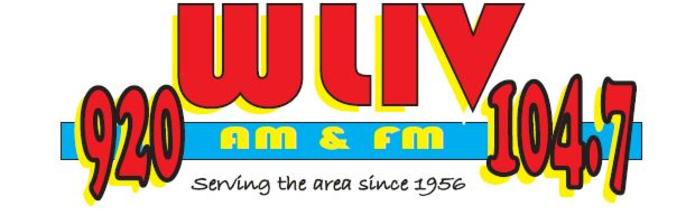
Former logo
