= Turkey in the Straw (disambiguation) =

Turkey in the Straw may refer to:

- "Turkey in the Straw", a folk song
- Turkey in the Straw: A Book of American Ballads and Primitive Verse, a 1935 collection of stories by MacKinlay Kantor
- "Turkey in the Straw", a 1942 recording by Carson Robison
- Turkey in the Straw, a 1942 soundie starring Freddie Fisher
