= WBXE =

- Baxter, Tennessee; United States
- Broadcast area: Cookeville, Tennessee
- Frequency: 93.7 MHz
- Branding: Rock 93.7

Programming
- Format: Mainstream rock
- Affiliations: Compass Media Networks; United Stations Radio Networks; Westwood One

Ownership
- Owner: JWC Broadcasting
- Sister stations: WKXD-FM, WLIV, WLQK, WUCH, WUCT

History
- First air date: October 1995

Technical information
- Licensing authority: FCC
- Facility ID: 31426
- Class: C3
- ERP: 6,100 watts
- HAAT: 201 meters (659 ft)
- Transmitter coordinates: 36°11′3.00″N 85°24′40.00″W

Links
- Public license information: Public file; LMS
- Webcast: Listen Live
- Website: rock937online.com

WBXE (93.7 FM, "Rock 93.7") is a radio station broadcasting a mainstream rock format. Licensed to Baxter, Tennessee, United States, the station serves the Cookeville area. The station is currently owned by JWC Broadcasting.
