= Cookeville, Tennessee =

Largest city and county seat of Putnam County, Tennessee, United States

- City
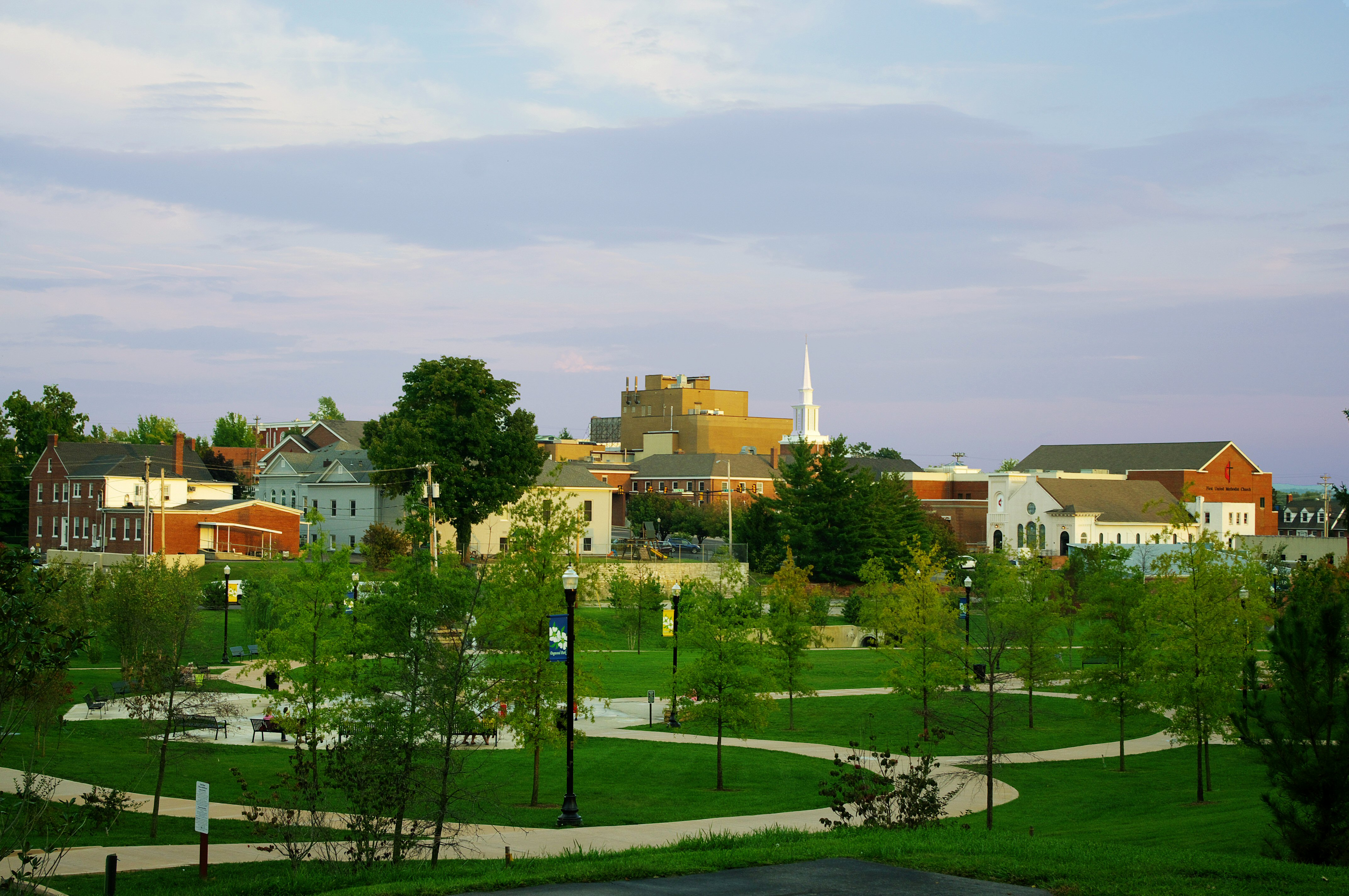
- Downtown Cookeville, viewed from Dogwood Park

- Flag Seal Logo
- Nicknames: Hub of the Upper Cumberland, Tennessee's College Town
- Location of Cookeville in Putnam County, Tennessee.
- Coordinates: 36°9′51″N 85°30′15″W
- Country: United States
- State: Tennessee
- County: Putnam
- Founded: 1854
- Incorporated: 1903
- Named for: Richard F. Cooke

Government
  - Type: Council-manager
  - Mayor: Chad Gilbert (R)
  - City Manager: James Mills
  - City Council: List of Councilmembers List: Luke Eldridge (also Vice Mayor) (R); Cigi England (D); Ali Bagci (R); Kelly Parkison (R)

Area
  - City: 35.95 sq mi (93.10 km^{2})
  - Land: 35.77 sq mi (92.64 km^{2})
  - Water: 0.18 sq mi (0.46 km^{2})
- Elevation: 1,089 ft (332 m)

Population (2020)
  - City: 34,842
  - Density: 974.0/sq mi (376.08/km^{2})
  - Urban: 44,207
- Time zone: UTC−6 (CST)
  - Summer (DST): UTC−5 (CDT)
- ZIP Codes: 38501–38503, 38505–38506
- Area code: 931
- FIPS code: 47-16920
- GNIS feature ID: 2404122
- Website: cookeville-tn.gov

Cookeville is the county seat of and the largest city in Putnam County, Tennessee, United States. As of the 2020 United States census, its population was reported to be 34,842. It is recognized as one of the country's micropolitan areas, smaller cities that function as significant regional economic hubs. Of Tennessee's 20 micropolitan areas, Cookeville is the largest.

At the 2020 census, the Cookeville micropolitan area's population was 141,333. The U.S. Census Bureau ranked the Cookeville micropolitan area as the 4th largest-gaining micropolitan area in the country between 2022 and 2023, with a one-year gain of 2,748 and a 2023 population of 148,226. The city is a college town, home to Tennessee Technological University.

== History ==
=== Early years and establishment ===
Before European settlement, the Cookeville area was dominated by the Cherokee tribe since the Paleo-Indian era. The Cherokee used the region as hunting grounds. Cherokee claims to the land in the Cumberland Plateau ended after the Treaty of Tellico was signed in October 1805. The area surrounding Cookeville and Putnam County was first reported to be settled by Virginia and North Carolina longhunters in the late 1700s to early 1800s, most of whom were of English and Scotch-Irish descent. Settlers arrived by Avery's Trace, which was known as the Walton Road in the area of present-day Cookeville. Putnam County was established in 1842, formed from parts of White, Overton, Jackson, Smith, and DeKalb Counties after the population increased sufficiently, straining those counties' abilities to support services to the isolated residents. Entering the 19th century, the area was dominated economically by the rise of agriculture, logging, and timber production. Putnam County reestablished itself in 1854, with the establishment of a county seat required by new Tennessee state law. In the same year, land purchased by Charles Crook became the area where the new county seat was established since it has access to natural springs able to support a town. The city was named Cookeville for Richard Fielding Cooke, a pioneer who settled in the area in 1810. Cooke was twice elected to the state senate, and was influential in establishing Putnam County in 1854.

=== Antebellum and Civil War era ===
The largely rugged landscape of the Cookeville area made it unsuitable for large-scale farming operations compared to most of the larger Middle Tennessee region. Still, several farming institutions operated in the region, some using African slave laborers. After Tennessee seceded from the United States in 1861, residents of the Cookeville area were divided about the American Civil War. Most opposed secession. Cookeville residents enrolled to assist in both the armies of the Confederacy and the Union. Several aggressions occurred during the war, including the burning of the Putnam County Courthouse in Cookeville's city square, the slaying of 20 and capture of 40 Confederate soldiers by Union Army Colonel Henry McConnell, and the Battle of Dug Hill.

Economic and cultural growth in Cookeville stagnated as a result of the political divide over secession, causing animosity among neighbors and families. The tides turned by the late 1800s, after the city's first hotel, the Isbell, was completed in 1886, and the Nashville and Knoxville Railroad in 1890.

=== 20th century ===
The investment made by railroad companies placed Cookeville on a path of considerable economic and industrial development with the Nashville and Knoxville railroad, which became the Tennessee Central Railroad. With this growth, Cookeville officially incorporated into a chartered city in 1903. Two years later, the city established the Cookeville Light and Water Department, when electricity was first distributed in the city. In 1909, the Tennessee Central Railroad constructed the Cookeville Depot in the city's West Side District, providing passenger rail service until 1955.

In 1909, local religious leaders with the aid of the Tennessee state government established Dixie College, a private school deeded to the community. The state government seized the institution in 1915 following decline in enrollment and financial support. The government reestablished it as Tennessee Polytechnic Institute, a public institute of technology focused on education in science, technology, engineering, and mathematics. The university made Cookeville a regional education hub and college town, increasing its population and post-secondary education enrollment. In 1965, it was renamed Tennessee Technological University.

With the advancement rail access, Cookeville began to industrialize with the rise of textile manufacturing, coal mining, and the rapid expansion of the timber production industry. The railroad's dominance declined by the beginning of the Great Depression. By 1930, the completion of U.S. Route 70N, the northern branch of U.S. Route 70, Cookeville's first modern highway, prompted further expansion of Cookeville's industrial and commercial markets. The United States Army Corps of Engineers' large-scale Center Hill Dam project provided jobs for Cookeville residents, and after its completion, provided advanced electricity production for industrial development, flood control of the nearby Caney Fork River, and recreational sites with the design of Edgar Evins and Burgess Falls state parks.

Other infrastructure additions to the city beneficial to the city's growth included a water treatment plant in 1946, the Cookeville General Hospital in 1950, and a wastewater treatment plant in 1952.

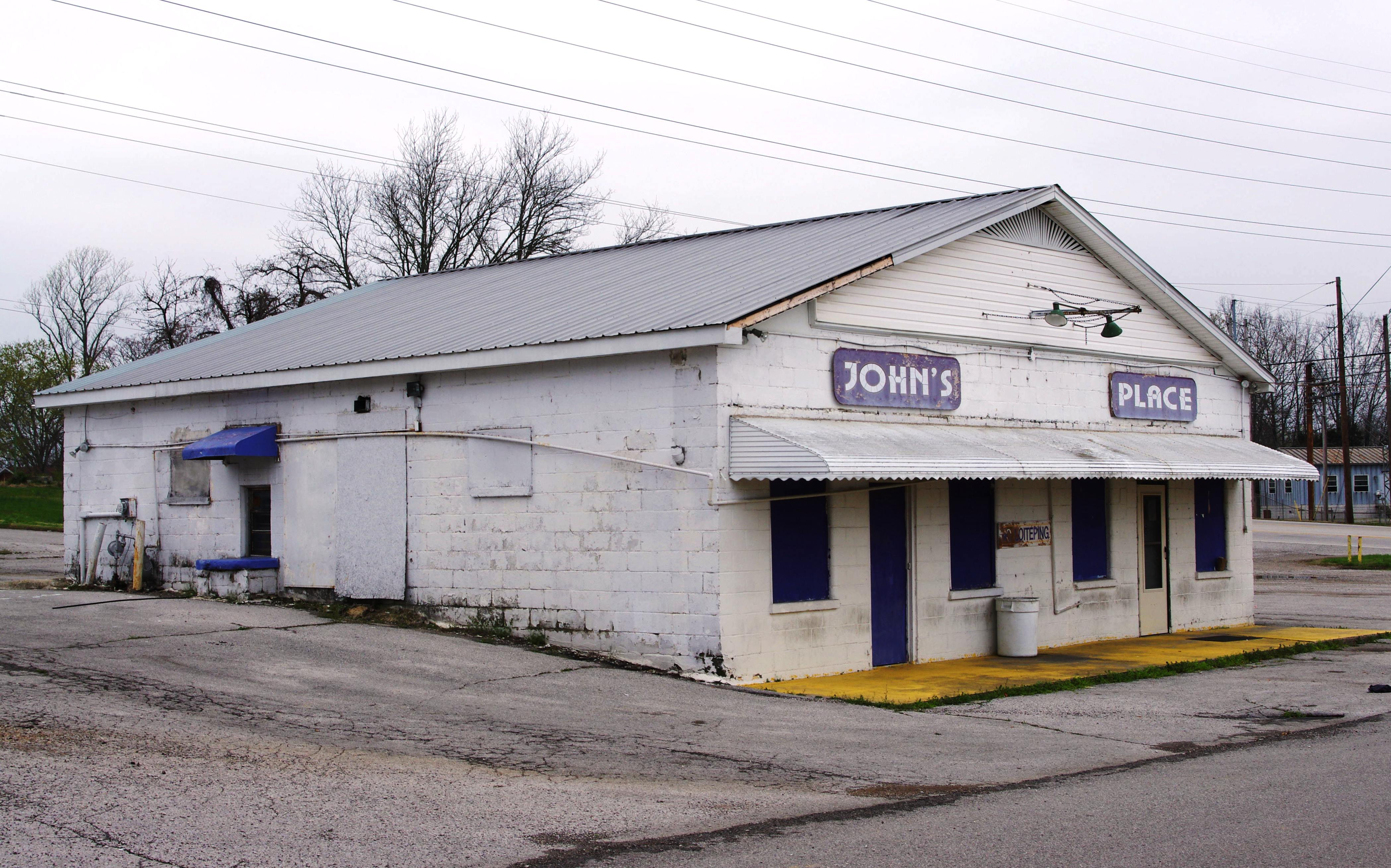
John's Place at 11 Gibson Ave.

During the Jim Crow era of the 1950s, John's Place was one business where white and black locals could socialize together. John's Place originally opened as Ed's Place in 1949, and was later known as McClellan's Cafe and finally John's Place as of 1957. At 11 Gibson Avenue, off West Spring Street, it was a grocery store and restaurant. John's Place is known for its southern cuisine—fried chicken, catfish, meatloaf, and corn bread—as well as beer. Many local white people encountered their first African American at the restaurant. John's Place was listed on the National Register of Historic Places in 2011.

By 1966, the Interstate 40 corridor was completed south of the city center, prompting annexation of several of the freeway's interchanges for commercial development. After its end of passenger rail use in 1955, the Cookeville Depot fell into disrepair. A group of local residents and preservationists worked to save the depot from demolition, and the Cookeville city government eventually purchased it. The group responsible for its preservation restored the depot and reopened it as a museum in 1985, the year it was listed on the National Register of Historic Places.

By the 1970 census, Cookeville's population had increased by more than 80% from 1960, as it rose from a predominately rural town into a larger hub city with increased enrollment at Tennessee Technological University and Interstate 40 positioning the city for increased employment opportunities.

The city's establishment as the economic hub of the Upper Cumberland region strengthened with the construction and completion of Tennessee State Route 111, also known as Appalachian Development Highway System Corridor J. Corridor J, which went through the engineering phase in 1978 and was completed in the late 1980s, provides expressway-grade access to Cookeville from communities in Overton and White counties.

Throughout the 1990s, the Cookeville Public Works and Engineering Department constructed several collector streets that aided commercial development along the northern side of the I-40 corridor in the city.

=== Modern day ===
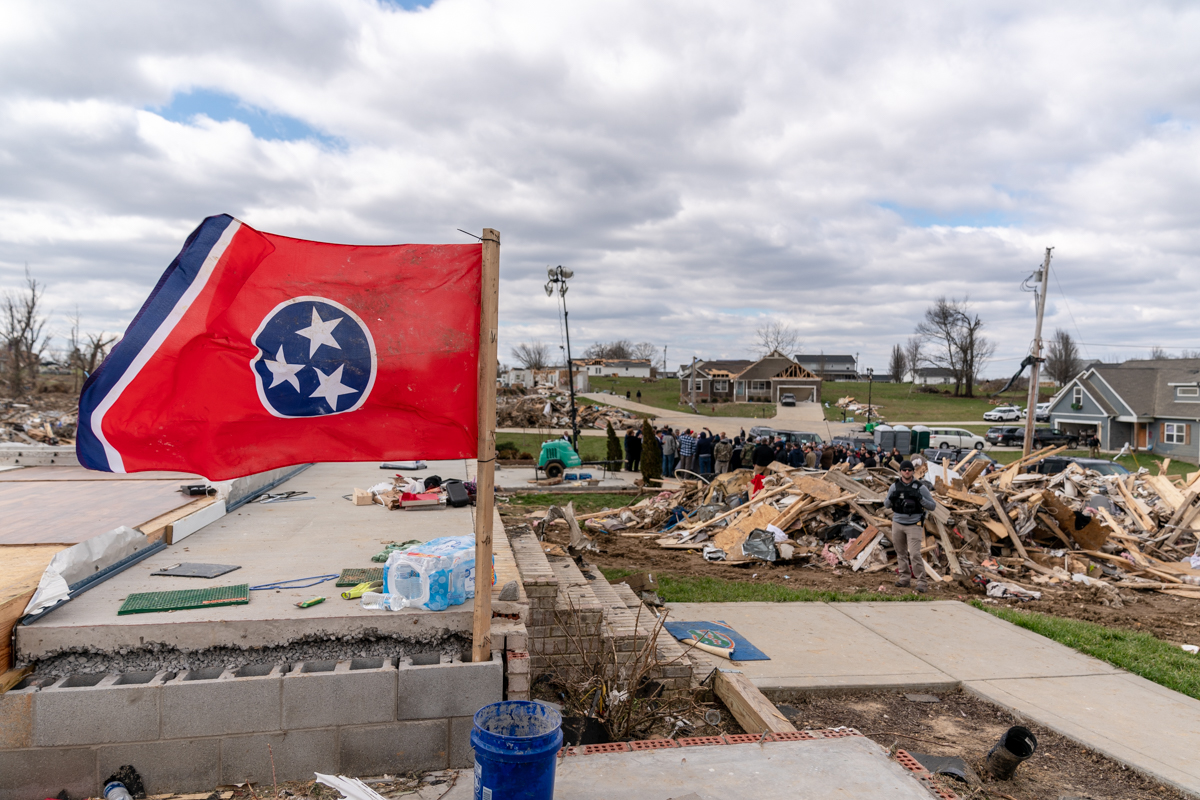
Aftermath of the March 2020 tornado in West Cookeville

Cookeville embarked on one of its recorded largest expansions of its city limits when it annexed over 10 square miles of previously unincorporated Putnam County between 2000 and 2009. In 2007, city officials approved the purchase of over 400 acres for a regional industrial park known as the Highlands Business Park. In 2008, Cookeville General Hospital, then recently renamed the Cookeville Regional Medical Center, completed a major renovation and expansion project as a result of the city's and region's population growth.

=== 2020 tornado ===
In the early morning of March 3, 2020, an EF4 tornado touched down west of Cookeville, damaging several of the city's western outskirt neighborhoods. It killed 19 people, injured 87, and caused more than $100 million in damages. Tennessee Tech closed for two days, encouraging student volunteers to assist first responders in rescue and clean-up. The tornado's estimated maximum wind speed of 175 mph along its nearly nine-mile path was recorded as the strongest storm of the outbreak.

== Geography ==
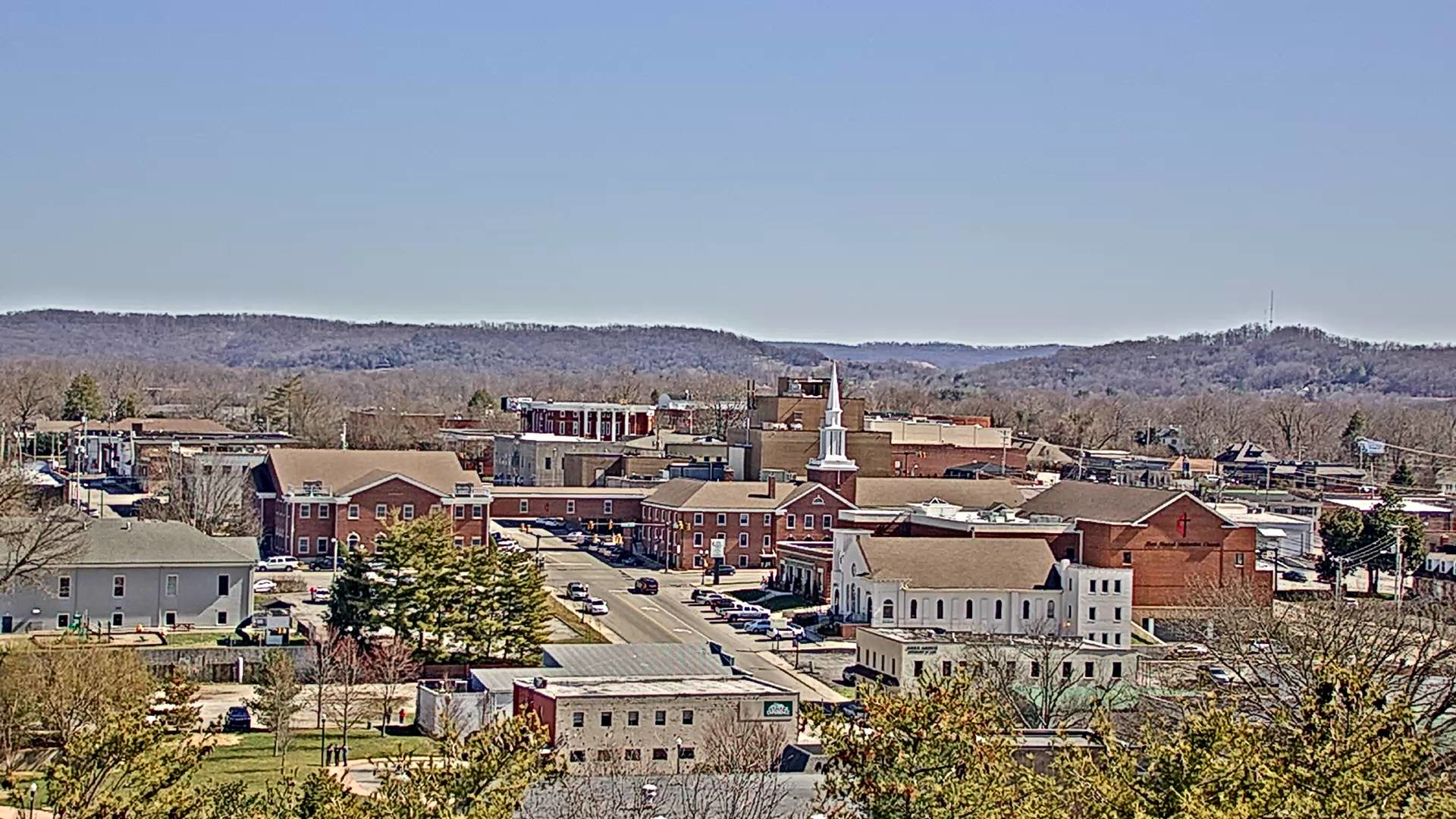
Downtown Cookeville looking east towards the Cumberland Plateau

According to the United States Census Bureau, the city has an area of 22.0 square miles (57 km^{2}), of which 21.9 square miles (57 km^{2}) is land and 0.2 square miles (0.52 km^{2}) (0.77%) is water.

Located on the Highland Rim, Cookeville's elevation (1100 ft AMSL) is a few hundred feet higher than Nashville's or Knoxville's. As a result, temperatures and humidity levels are generally slightly lower in Cookeville than in either the Nashville Basin or the Tennessee Valley.

Cookeville is in Tennessee's Upper Cumberland region near the crossroads of I-40, SR 136, and US 70N-SR 24. It is 79 miles east of Nashville and 101 miles west of Knoxville.

Three man-made lakes maintained by the Corps of Engineers are near Cookeville. They were built to help flood control in Center Hill Lake, Cordell Hull Lake, and Dale Hollow Lake in the Cumberland Plateau's narrow valleys. Two smaller man-made lakes, City Lake and Burgess Falls Lake, lie along the Falling Water River, which flows through southeastern Putnam County. Cane Creek Lake, created by an earthen dam built by the Civilian Conservation Corps, is in western Cookeville.

=== Climate ===
Cookeville has a humid subtropical climate (Köppen climate classification: Cfa) or oceanic climate (Trewartha climate classification: Doa) depending on the classification system used, with relatively high temperatures and evenly distributed precipitation through the year. Summers are typically hot and humid and winters are mild and cool. The highest temperature recorded in Cookeville since 1896 is 105 °F (41 °C) on June 29, 2012, and the lowest temperature recorded is −22 °F (−30 °C) on January 21, 1985. Average annual precipitation is 60.02 in (1,525 mm), with the highest recorded precipitation at 6.06 in (154 mm) on September 29, 1964. Average annual snowfall is 6.1 in (150 mm) with the highest recorded snowfall at 15.2 in (39 cm) on November 3, 1966.

Climate data for Cookeville, Tennessee (1991–2020 normals, extremes 1896–present)
| Month | Jan | Feb | Mar | Apr | May | Jun | Jul | Aug | Sep | Oct | Nov | Dec | Year |
|---|---|---|---|---|---|---|---|---|---|---|---|---|---|
| Record high °F (°C) | 80 (27) | 82 (28) | 87 (31) | 96 (36) | 98 (37) | 105 (41) | 105 (41) | 105 (41) | 104 (40) | 96 (36) | 88 (31) | 77 (25) | 105 (41) |
| Mean maximum °F (°C) | 66.9 (19.4) | 71.5 (21.9) | 77.9 (25.5) | 83.9 (28.8) | 87.5 (30.8) | 92.0 (33.3) | 93.7 (34.3) | 93.3 (34.1) | 91.3 (32.9) | 85.5 (29.7) | 77.6 (25.3) | 68.7 (20.4) | 95.1 (35.1) |
| Mean daily maximum °F (°C) | 47.1 (8.4) | 51.4 (10.8) | 60.0 (15.6) | 69.8 (21.0) | 77.5 (25.3) | 84.3 (29.1) | 87.3 (30.7) | 86.9 (30.5) | 81.9 (27.7) | 71.9 (22.2) | 60.4 (15.8) | 50.9 (10.5) | 69.1 (20.6) |
| Daily mean °F (°C) | 37.0 (2.8) | 40.2 (4.6) | 47.7 (8.7) | 56.5 (13.6) | 65.4 (18.6) | 73.1 (22.8) | 76.7 (24.8) | 75.5 (24.2) | 69.7 (20.9) | 58.4 (14.7) | 47.7 (8.7) | 40.6 (4.8) | 57.4 (14.1) |
| Mean daily minimum °F (°C) | 27.0 (−2.8) | 29.0 (−1.7) | 35.4 (1.9) | 43.2 (6.2) | 53.3 (11.8) | 61.9 (16.6) | 66.1 (18.9) | 64.2 (17.9) | 57.4 (14.1) | 45.0 (7.2) | 35.1 (1.7) | 30.3 (−0.9) | 45.7 (7.6) |
| Mean minimum °F (°C) | 8.1 (−13.3) | 11.7 (−11.3) | 19.7 (−6.8) | 28.1 (−2.2) | 37.7 (3.2) | 50.1 (10.1) | 56.9 (13.8) | 55.4 (13.0) | 43.7 (6.5) | 29.7 (−1.3) | 20.7 (−6.3) | 14.9 (−9.5) | 5.4 (−14.8) |
| Record low °F (°C) | −22 (−30) | −13 (−25) | −1 (−18) | 20 (−7) | 29 (−2) | 38 (3) | 46 (8) | 43 (6) | 33 (1) | 22 (−6) | 4 (−16) | −13 (−25) | −22 (−30) |
| Average precipitation inches (mm) | 5.29 (134) | 5.48 (139) | 5.46 (139) | 5.35 (136) | 5.15 (131) | 5.45 (138) | 5.69 (145) | 3.93 (100) | 4.47 (114) | 3.35 (85) | 4.30 (109) | 6.10 (155) | 60.02 (1,525) |
| Average snowfall inches (cm) | 2.3 (5.8) | 1.8 (4.6) | 0.9 (2.3) | 0.0 (0.0) | 0.0 (0.0) | 0.0 (0.0) | 0.0 (0.0) | 0.0 (0.0) | 0.0 (0.0) | 0.0 (0.0) | 0.1 (0.25) | 1.0 (2.5) | 6.1 (15) |
| Average precipitation days (≥ 0.01 in) | 13.0 | 12.2 | 13.2 | 11.6 | 12.3 | 12.3 | 11.8 | 9.7 | 8.5 | 8.9 | 10.4 | 13.3 | 137.2 |
| Average snowy days (≥ 0.1 in) | 1.5 | 1.6 | 0.7 | 0.0 | 0.0 | 0.0 | 0.0 | 0.0 | 0.0 | 0.0 | 0.0 | 1.1 | 4.9 |
Source: NOAA

== Demographics ==
Historical population
| Census | Pop. | Note | %± |
|---|---|---|---|
| 1870 | 156 | | — |
| 1880 | 279 | | 78.8% |
| 1890 | 469 | | 68.1% |
| 1910 | 1,848 | | — |
| 1920 | 2,395 | | 29.6% |
| 1930 | 3,738 | | 56.1% |
| 1940 | 4,364 | | 16.7% |
| 1950 | 6,924 | | 58.7% |
| 1960 | 7,805 | | 12.7% |
| 1970 | 14,403 | | 84.5% |
| 1980 | 20,535 | | 42.6% |
| 1990 | 21,744 | | 5.9% |
| 2000 | 23,923 | | 10.0% |
| 2010 | 30,435 | | 27.2% |
| 2020 | 34,842 | | 14.5% |
| 2025 (est.) | 38,212 | ▲ | 9.7% |
Sources: 2020

=== 2020 census ===
As of the 2020 census, there were 34,842 people living in Cookeville, including 14,248 households and 7,341 families.

Racial composition as of the 2020 census
| Race | Number | Percent |
|---|---|---|
| White | 27,931 | 80.2% |
| Black or African American | 1,686 | 4.8% |
| American Indian and Alaska Native | 403 | 1.2% |
| Asian | 798 | 2.3% |
| Native Hawaiian and Other Pacific Islander | 23 | 0.1% |
| Some other race | 1,833 | 5.3% |
| Two or more races | 2,168 | 6.2% |
| Hispanic or Latino (of any race) | 3,443 | 9.9% |

The median age was 30.3 years, with 18.6% of residents under the age of 18 and 15.2% 65 years of age or older. For every 100 females there were 98.8 males, and for every 100 females age 18 and over there were 98.0 males.

94.6% of residents lived in urban areas, while 5.4% lived in rural areas.

There were 14,248 households in Cookeville; 24.1% had children under the age of 18 living in them, 34.6% were married-couple households, 24.3% were households with a male householder and no spouse or partner present, and 32.7% were households with a female householder and no spouse or partner present. About 36.1% of all households were made up of individuals, and 12.1% had someone living alone who was 65 years of age or older.

There were 15,819 housing units, of which 9.9% were vacant. The homeowner vacancy rate was 3.3% and the rental vacancy rate was 8.3%.

=== 2010 census ===
As of the census of 2010, there was a population of 30,435, with 12,471 households and 6,669 families residing in the city. The population density was 1,094.5 inhabitants per square mile (422.6/km^{2}). There were 13,706 housing units at an average density of 491.6 per square mile (189.8/km^{2}). The racial makeup of the city was 87.9% White, 3.4% African American, 0.6% Native American, 2.0% Asian, 0.21% Pacific Islander, 4.0% from other races, and 2.1% from two or more races. Hispanic or Latino of any race were 7.0% of the population.

There were 12,471 households, out of which 25.2% had children under the age of 18 living with them, 37% were married couples living together, 12% had a female householder with no husband present, and 46.5% were non-families. Of all households 33.9% were made up of individuals, and 10.9% had someone living alone who was 65 years of age or older. The average household size was 2.19 and the average family size was 2.83.

In the city, the population was spread out, with 18.6% under the age of 18, 25.2% from 18 to 24, 25.1% from 25 to 44, 18.0% from 45 to 64, and 13.7% who were 65 years of age or older. The median age was 29 years. For every 100 females, there were 101.4 males. For every 100 females age 18 and over, there were 100.8 males.

The median income for a household in the city was $29,789, and the median income for a family was $39,623. Males had a median income of $28,013 versus $21,710 for females. The per capita income for the city was $19,297. About 13.1% of families and 23.2% of the population were below the poverty line, including 20.1% of those under age 18 and 18.7% of those age 65 or over.

== Economy ==
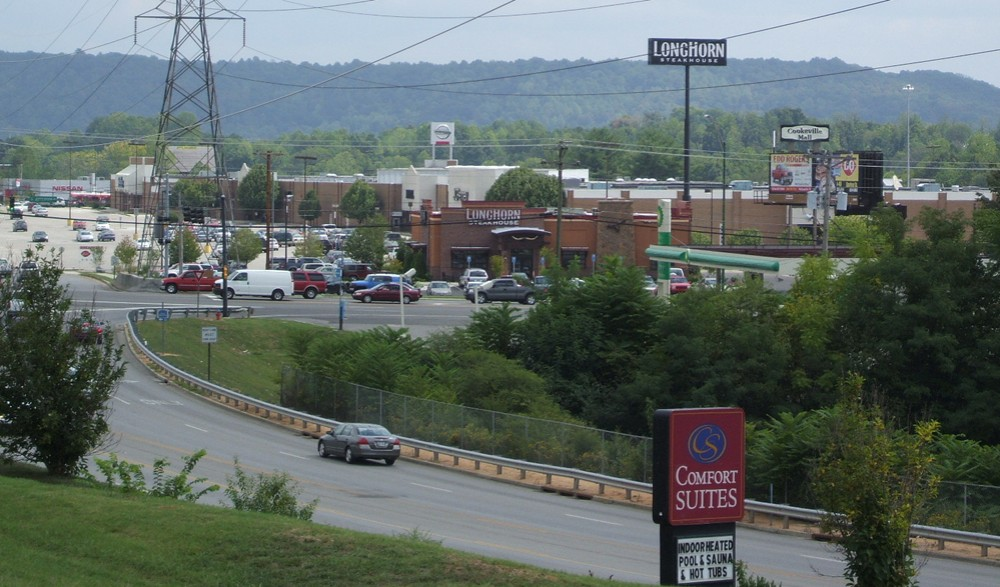
Cookeville Mall

Cookeville is the Upper Cumberland region's largest city and as such is known as the "Hub of the Upper Cumberlands". It is at the center of the labor market area consisting of Putnam, Cumberland, DeKalb, Jackson, Overton, Smith, and White Counties, with a civilian labor force in 2013 of 103,500 jobs (roughly one-third of which are in Putnam County). As of June 30, 2020, 16 commercial banks and four credit unions operated in the city, with combined deposits over $2.5 billion. Total retail sales in Cookeville for 2016 were $1.6 billion. Putnam County's unemployment rate was 3.0% as of May 2017, down from 3.7% in April. Cookeville's cost of living is low, and the city ranked 8th in the U.S. on the Center for Regional Economic Competitivess Cost of Living Index in 2016.

=== Top employers ===
According to the city's 2030 Comprehensive Annual Plan published in 2010, Cookeville's top employers in 2009 were:

| # | Employer | # of Employees |
|---|---|---|
| 1 | Cookeville Regional Medical Center | 1,600 |
| 2 | Tennessee Tech | 1,500 |
| 3 | Putnam County Board of Education | 1,200 |
| 4 | Averitt Express | 600 |
| 5 | Oreck | 550 |
| 6 | Cummins, Inc. | 470 |
| 7 | State of Tennessee | 440 |
| 8 | City of Cookeville | 400 |
| 9 | Tutco | 360 |
| 10 | SunTrust Banks | 350 |

=== Manufacturing ===
Manufacturing is the largest sector of Cookeville's economy, with over 100 plants and 8,000 employees. With 13% of the workforce, retail trade employs about 4,200 people and is the second-largest sector. Health care workers are about 12% of the work force, at 3,840. Education is another major sector, with nearly 2,000 employees at Tennessee Tech and the public school system.

Several companies are based in Cookeville. In 2006 Oreck manufacturing moved its Long Beach, Mississippi, plant to Cookeville after Hurricane Katrina. Oreck employs about 500 people and is a prominent business in the region. The trucking company Averitt Express is based in Cookeville, as is J&S Construction. The manufacturing company ATC Automation is also based in Cookeville, and in 2016 announced a $10.4 million investment plan intended to add 110 engineering jobs to the city. Later in 2016, Academy Sports & Outdoors opened a 1.6 million square foot distribution center in Cookeville, the state's largest distribution center under one roof. It employs 700. Also in 2016, Spanish automotive supplier Ficosa relocated a factory and 450 jobs from nearby Crossville to a new, $58 million facility in Cookeville, where it added an additional 550 jobs. The Ficosa plant produces high-tech rear-view mirrors.

=== Technology and research ===
In 2017, Science Applications International Corp. announced that it would establish its first center of excellence to deliver information technology services in downtown Cookeville. It will be named the Technology Integration Gateway and will employ 300 information technology (IT) professionals when fully developed. Also in 2017, Scottsdale, Arizona-based Digital Dream Forge opened a software testing facility in Cookeville, employing 80. In 2018, Italian tile and glass maker Colorrobia announced it would open a $5 million laboratory in Cookeville to service ceramic tile factories in the area.

=== Retail ===
Interstate Drive, parallel to Interstate 40 at the south end of town, is the site of many popular restaurant and hotel chains. A 228,000-square-foot retail park, Shoppes at Eagle Point, is just off of Interstate Drive at the intersection of South Walnut Avenue and East Veterans Drive. Historic Downtown's West Side has several locally owned retail stores and restaurants. Cookeville is also home to three of the region's microbreweries.

Cookeville is considered to be CrossFit's "global mecca", with many of the world's top CrossFit Games athletes living and training together at four-time individual champion Rich Froning's CrossFit Mayhem location.

=== Points of interest ===
- Tennessee Tech

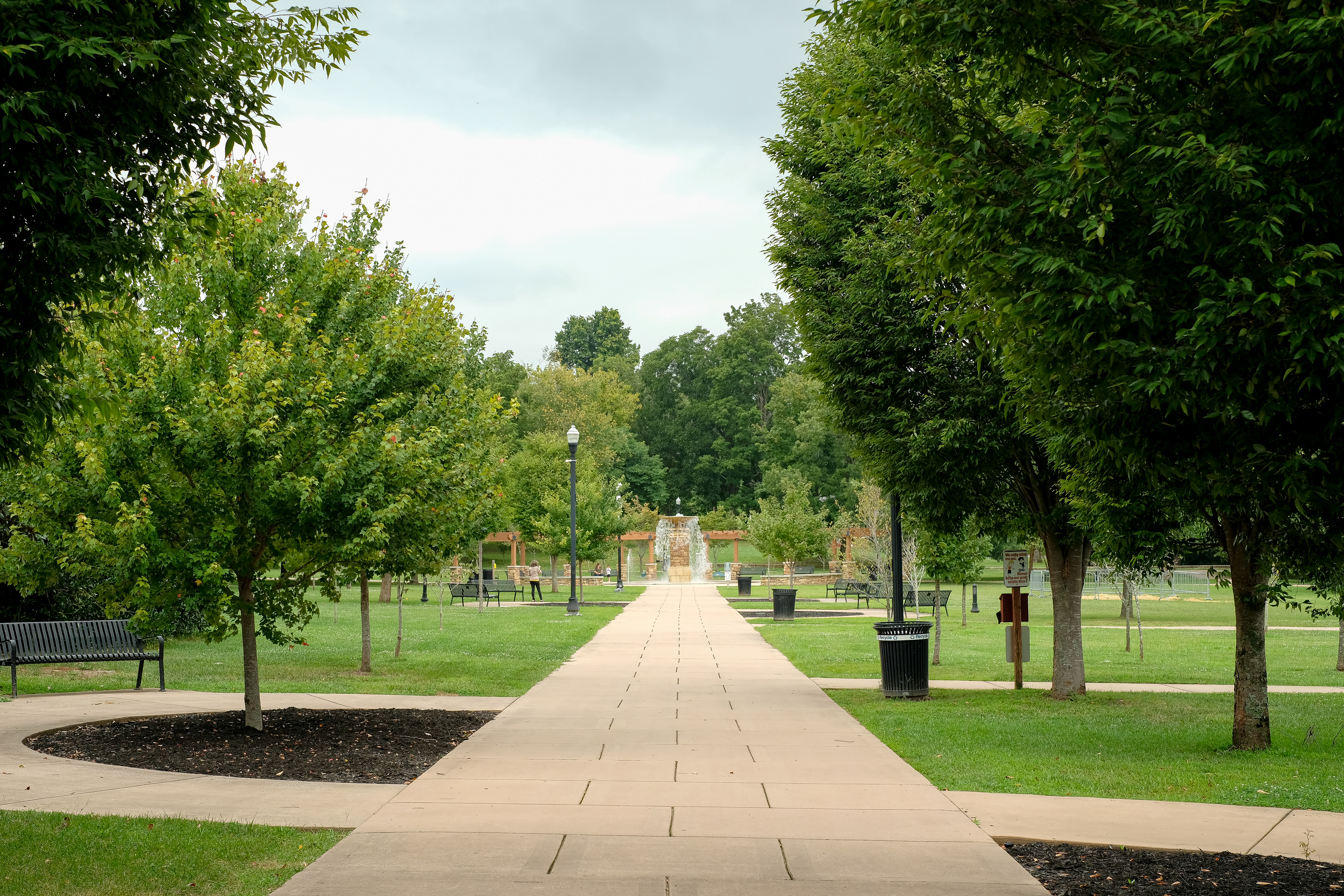
Dogwood Park viewed from East Broad Street entrance.

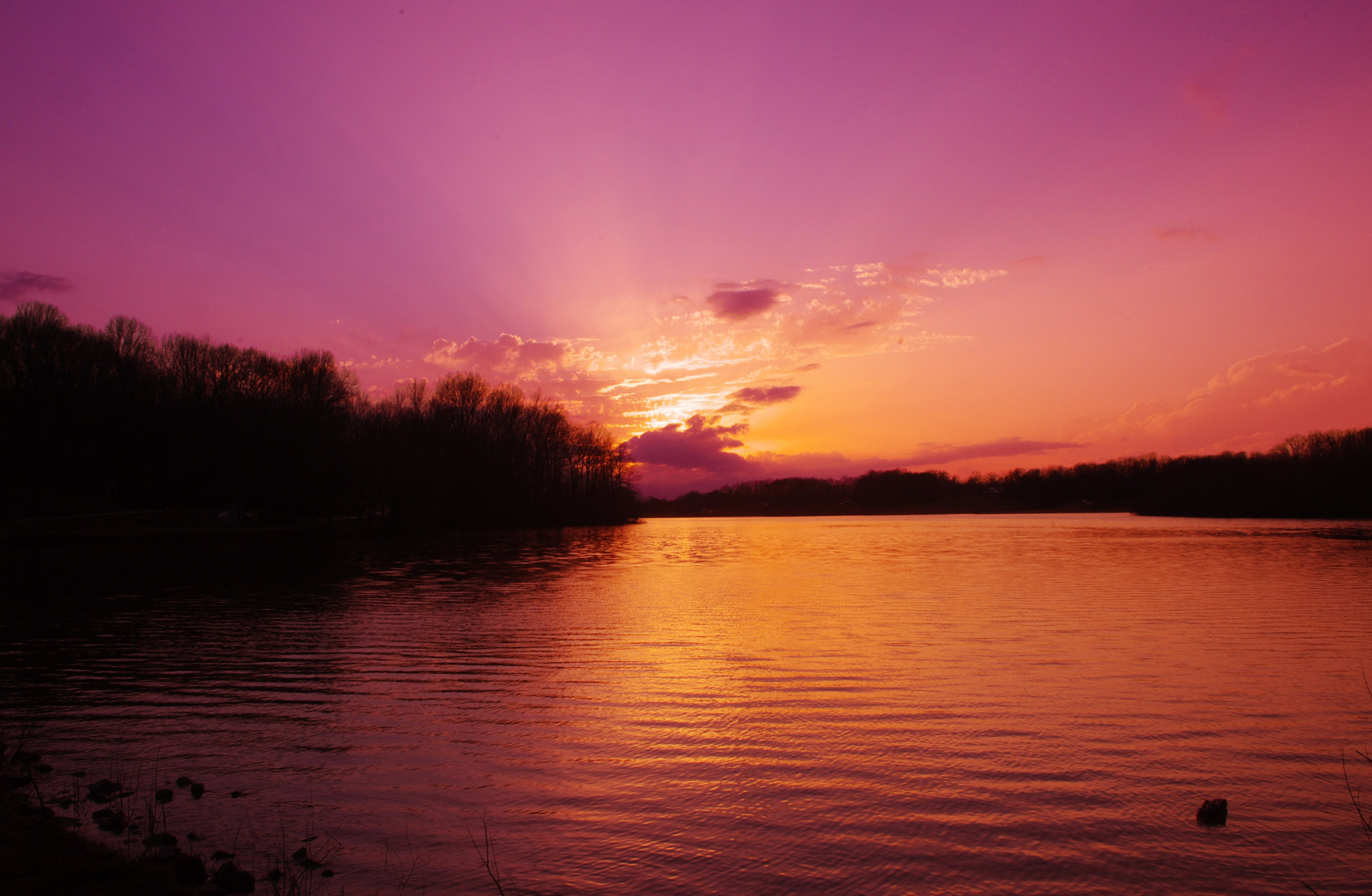
Cane Creek Lake

- Dogwood Park
- Cane Creek Park
- Heart of the City Playground
- Park View Skate Park
- Window Cliffs State Natural Area
- Burgess Falls State Park
- Cummins Falls State Park
- Gerald D. Coorts Memorial Arboretum
- Cookeville Depot Museum
- Cookeville Performing Arts Center
- Arda E. Lee's Hidden Hollow
- White Plains
- The Arcade Building The Arcade (Cookeville, Tennessee)

=== Museums ===
- Cookeville History Museum
- Cookeville Children's Museum
- Derryberry Art Gallery
- Cumberland Art Society and Gallery
- Appalachian Center for Craft Gallery

=== Performing arts ===
Dogwood Outdoor Performance Pavilion

- Cookeville Community Band
- Cookeville Children's Theatre
- Dogwood Outdoor Performance Pavilion
- Bryan Symphony Orchestra
- Bryan Fine Arts Center
- Mastersingers
- Cookeville Performing Arts Center
- Backdoor Playhouse
- Drama Center Backstage
- Wesley Arena Theatre
- Shakespeare in the Park
- StoryTeller Theatre and Academy
- Brown Bag Lunch Concerts

== Government ==
Cookeville has a council-manager municipal government. There is an elected five-member city council, including a mayor, vice mayor, and three city council members. The city council establishes policy that is administered by a full-time city manager. City council members serve four-year terms, and the city manager and city clerk are appointed by the city council. The mayor is Chad Gilbert, and the four other city council members are Vice Mayor Luke Eldridge, Ali Bagci, Cigi England, and Kelly Parkison. The city manager is James Mills and the city clerk is Darian Coons.

Cookeville is also the county seat of Putnam County. The county mayor is Randy Porter. As of July 2014, Putnam County's population is 74,165.

== Education ==
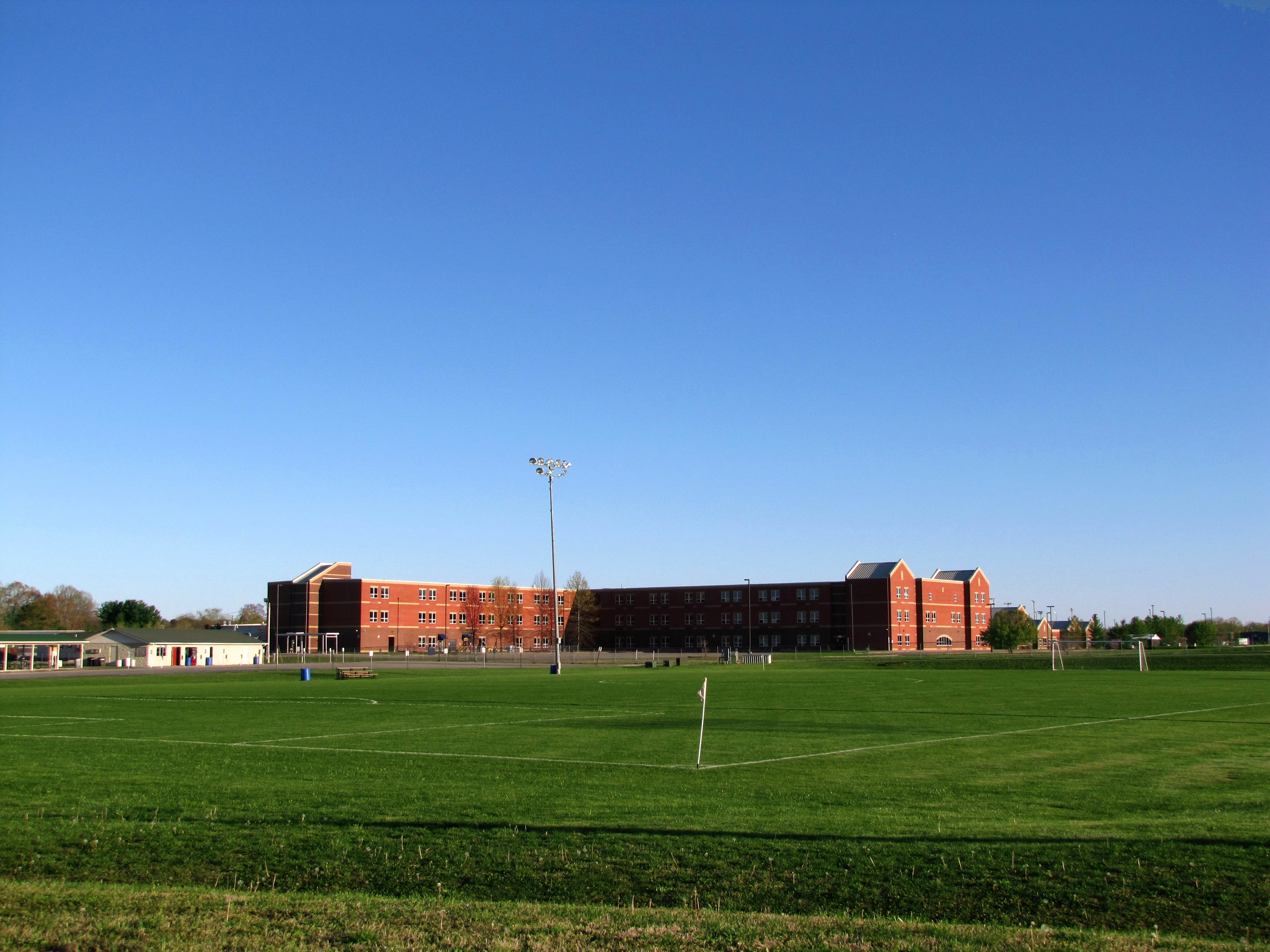
Cookeville High School

Cookeville is predominantly a college town, home to Tennessee Tech since 1915. Tennessee Tech is a public university with programs concentrating in science, technology, engineering, and mathematics (STEM) studies, and is ranked 35th by U.S. News & World Report on its list of the Top Regional Universities in the South, as well as the most underrated university in Tennessee. The university is rated under "Doctoral Universities - High Research Activity (R2)" by the Carnegie classification system among schools with at least 20 doctoral graduates per year. In addition to its science and engineering programs, the university is also home to the Mastersingers and the Tennessee Tech Tuba Ensemble, led by R. Winston Morris.

Cookeville is also home to a satellite campus of Volunteer State Community College as well as the Tennessee Bible College, a Christian college affiliated with the Churches of Christ.

Cookeville's public schools are run by Putnam County Schools, which consists of 18 elementary, middle, and high schools. Schools in Cookeville include Cookeville High School, Jere Whitson Elementary, Prescott Middle School, Northeast Elementary, Capshaw Elementary, Dry Valley School, Parkview Elementary, Sycamore Elementary, Cane Creek Elementary, Avery Trace Middle, and the Adult High School. Cookeville High School is one of Tennessee's six largest public high schools. Cookeville High School and Avery Trace Middle School are among Tennessee's 20 schools to offer the International Baccalaureate program.

== Media ==
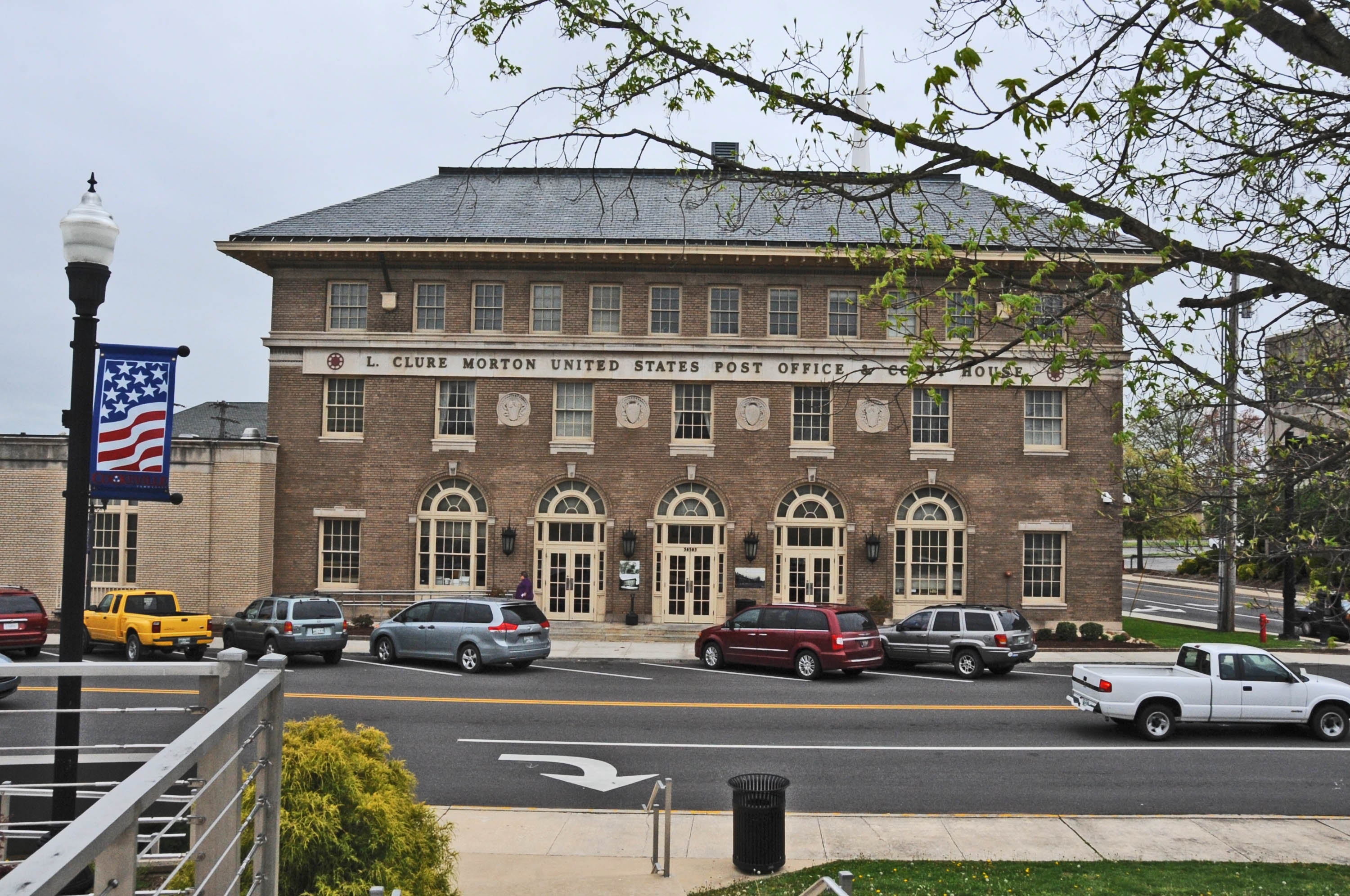
U.S Courthouse and downtown branch Post Office

Cookeville's major daily newspaper is the Herald-Citizen, which publishes in print and online formats daily, Sunday through Friday. Cookeville is the headquarters of the Upper Cumberland Business Journal, a quarterly business newspaper serving the 14-county Upper Cumberland region. Cookeville is home to one broadcast television station, WCTE TV 22 (PBS). Charter Communications provides cable television service, and Dish Network provides satellite television. Using cable or satellite, television stations and network affiliates from the Nashville media market can be received. Local Internet service providers include Charter Communications, Frontier Communications, and Twin Lakes Telephone Cooperative, which has introduced gigabit broadband internet service in Cookeville.

Cookeville is served by 13 FM and three AM radio stations. Tennessee Tech University's campus radio indie station operates at WTTU 88.5 FM, and National Public Radio (NPR) broadcasts at WHRS 91.7 FM (simulcast with WPLN, Nashville). Rock and roll and Top 40 stations include WKSW 98.5 Kiss FM and WBXE Rock 93.7 FM, and country music can be found at WGSQ 94.7 FM Country Giant & WKXD-FM 106.9 Kicks FM. There is a light rock station at WLQK 95.9 FM, and three Christian music stations: WAYM 90.5 FM Christian Hit Radio, WWOG 90.9 FM King of Kings Radio, and Catholic Radio station WRIM 89.9 Risen Radio. Three talk radio stations broadcast on both the FM and the AM dials: WPTN The Eagle 106.1 FM and AM 780 (sports), WHUB The Hub 107.7 FM and AM 1400 (news), and WUCT News Talk 94.1 FM and 1600 AM (news).

== Infrastructure ==
=== Transportation ===
==== Road ====
Cookeville is about 80 miles (130 km) east of Nashville and 100 miles (160 km) west of Knoxville along Interstate 40 (I-40). Chattanooga is about 98 miles (158 km) south on Tennessee State Route 111 (SR 111). U.S. Route 70N (US 70N, Spring Street in central and eastern Cookeville, W. Broad Street on the western side) runs east–west through Cookeville's central business district, which is about 1.5 mi (2.4 km) northwest of the interchange of I-40 with SR 111. The city's major streets are North Washington Avenue and South Jefferson Avenue, which run north–south through the central business district, and Willow Avenue, running north–south and immediately adjacent to Tennessee Tech University. In addition to Spring Street (US 70N), 10th Street runs east–west and connects North Washington Avenue with the neighboring town of Algood, and 12th Street runs east–west and connects North Washington with Willow, and leads out of town to the west, connecting with Tennessee State Route 56 (SR 56, Gainesboro Highway) via Tennessee State Route 290 (SR 290). Running east–west adjacent to I-40 in the southern section of the city is Interstate Drive, which is populated by several national restaurant chains, hotels, and other businesses.

==== Air ====
There are no commercial passenger airports in the area, but the Cookeville City Council has studied commercial service as of 2022. In White County, about 8.5 nautical miles (15.7 km) south of the central business district, is the Upper Cumberland Regional Airport (ICAO: KSRB, FAA LID: SRB), a small general aviation airport serving primarily single-engine aircraft. Commercial flights are available at Nashville International Airport (IATA: BNA, ICAO: KBNA, FAA LID: BNA), along I-40 72 mi (116 km) to the west. Airport shuttles and the Upper Cumberland Human Resource Agency (UCHRA) provide transportation to Nashville International. UCHRA's Connect Upper Cumberland service route provides each community with daily intercity bus service on I-40 and I-24 into Nashville and Murfreesboro, with stops including the Greyhound Bus Station, airport, and other requested destinations.

==== Rail ====
Cookeville Depot Museum

Since Cookeville's founding, rail transport was a major part of the economy, and the Tennessee Central Railway connecting Nashville and Knoxville had a major rail depot in the central business district. This railway was used primarily to transport East Tennessee's coal and minerals to the midstate region. The coal industry declined during the 1960s, and the Tennessee Central Railway was discontinued in 1968. Construction of a bicycle trail adjacent to the railway's path began in 2013, with the reconstruction of the rail depot in Monterey. Plans are to connect this depot and the rail depot in Cookeville's central business district (now a museum) with a 19 mi (31 km) bicycle trail.

== Notable people ==
- Mack Brown – former head football coach of the North Carolina Tar Heels and former head football coach of the Texas Longhorns
- Watson Brown – older brother of North Carolina Tar Heels head coach Mack Brown, former head football coach of the Rice Owls, Vanderbilt Commodores, UAB Blazers, and Tennessee Tech Golden Eagles
- Jim Carlen – former head football coach of the West Virginia Mountaineers, Texas Tech Red Raiders, and South Carolina Gamecocks
- Sunny Choi – Olympic breakdancer born in Cookeville
- Rich Froning Jr. – four-time individual and four-time team champion of the CrossFit Games
- Robert Ben Garant – "Deputy Junior" from the TV show Reno 911!
- Bobby Greenwood – professional golfer
- Jake Hoot – winner of the 17th season of The Voice
- Huda Kattan – makeup artist, beauty blogger, and founder of cosmetics line Huda Beauty
- Mona Kattan – CEO of KayAli perfume, Dubai Bling star
- Byron (Low Tax) Looper – convicted murderer of State Senator Tommy Burks in 1998
- Harold E. Martin – Pulitzer Prize-winning newspaperman and former co-owner of the Herald Citizen
- Billy Napier – head football coach of the University of Florida Gators and former head football coach of the University of Louisiana at Lafayette
- Jack Norton – children's musician and host of children's TV show The Zinghoppers
- William Eldridge Odom – former National Security Agency director
- Michael Penix Jr. – professional American football quarterback for the Atlanta Falcons
- Alison Piepmeier – scholar and feminist known for her book Girl Zines: Making Media, Doing Feminism. She was director of Women's and Gender Studies and associate professor of English at the College of Charleston.
- J. J. Redick – former NBA player, born in Cookeville
- John Rose – U.S. representative for Tennessee
- Elmo Stoll – former Old Order Amish bishop who founded the "Christian Communities", of which the center was Cookeville
- Maria Taylor – sportscaster born in Cookeville
- Trent Taylor – professional American football player born in Cookeville
- Lonnie Warwick – former professional football player

== Bibliography ==
- Friends of the Cookeville History Museum (2008). Cookeville and Putnam County. Charleston, South Carolina: Arcadia Publishing. ISBN 9780738553870.
- University of Tennessee Bureau of Public Administration (1948). A Study of the Organization of the Government of Cookeville, Tennessee. Knoxville, Tennessee: University of Tennessee Press.
- Holloway, Sarah (2011). Cookeville Voices. Nightengale Press. ISBN 9781933449944.
- Keith, Jeanette (1995). Country People in the New South: Tennessee's Upper Cumberland. University of North Carolina Press. ISBN 9780807845264.
- Anderson, Joseph (1972). Applications of an Urban Model to Cookeville, Tennessee. Cookeville, Tennessee: Tennessee Technological University Press.
- Tennessee State Planning Commission, Middle Tennessee Office (1964). The Economy and People of Cookeville and Putnam County. Nashville, Tennessee.
