= Arda E. Lee's Hidden Hollow =

Recreational park in Tennessee

Arda E. Lee's Hidden Hollow is an 86-acre (350,000 m^{2}) recreational park near Cookeville, Tennessee created by Arda E. Lee in the 1970s.

Originally the property was a tobacco, corn, and cattle farm owned by Arda's father, Eldridge, and uncle, Everett. In 1952 he purchased the property. When Arda's employer, Lockheed Martin, transferred the tool designer to Marietta, Georgia a few years later, the family began making weekend trips to Cookeville, Tennessee. In the late 1960s Arda had "a vision from God" telling him to build the park. The features included a 50-foot (15 m)-tall cross illuminated by more than 40 90-watt floodlights, a fishing and swimming pond, a petting zoo, volleyball courts, playgrounds and picnic areas, and a stuffed deer named "Dee Dee". The attractions on the property were by and large self-made, and could even be considered outsider art.

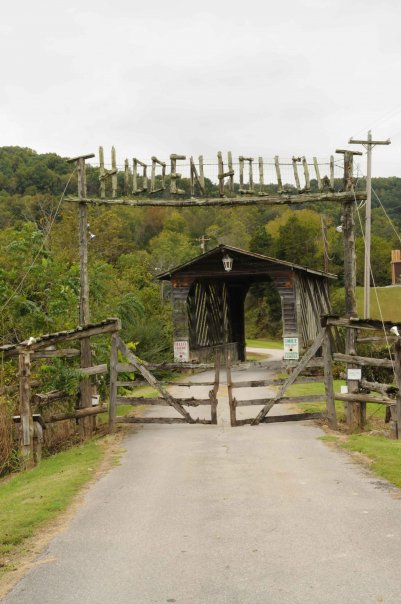
