= WLQK =

- Livingston, Tennessee; United States
- Broadcast area: Cookeville, Tennessee
- Frequency: 95.9 MHz
- Branding: Lite Rock 95.9

Programming
- Format: Adult contemporary
- Affiliations: Compass Media Networks; Premiere Networks; United Stations Radio Networks

Ownership
- Owner: JWC Broadcasting
- Sister stations: WBXE, WKXD-FM, WLIV, WUCH, WUCT

History
- First air date: December 1968 (as WLIV-FM)
- Former call signs: WLIV-FM (1968–1981); WXKG (1981–1992); WCSD (1992–1999); WUSV (1999–2001)

Technical information
- Licensing authority: FCC
- Facility ID: 73212
- Class: C2
- ERP: 20,000 watts
- HAAT: 239 meters (784 ft)
- Transmitter coordinates: 36°11′36.00″N 85°20′41.00″W

Links
- Public license information: Public file; LMS
- Webcast: Listen Live
- Website: literock959.com

WLQK (95.9 FM, "Lite Rock 95.9") is a radio station broadcasting an adult contemporary music format. Licensed to Livingston, Tennessee, United States, the station serves the Cookeville area. The station is currently owned by Stonecom.
