= Upper Cumberland Business Journal =

American magazine

- Format: Online Broadsheet
- Owner(s): PTT Ventures, LLC
- Publisher: Mike McCloud, MMA Creative
- Editor: Ron Moses
- Language: English
- Headquarters: Cookeville, Tennessee
- Website: ucbjournal.com

The Upper Cumberland Business Journal is a daily online magazine in Cookeville, Tennessee.
