= White Plains (Cookeville, Tennessee) =

Historic house in Tennessee, United States

- U.S. National Register of Historic Places
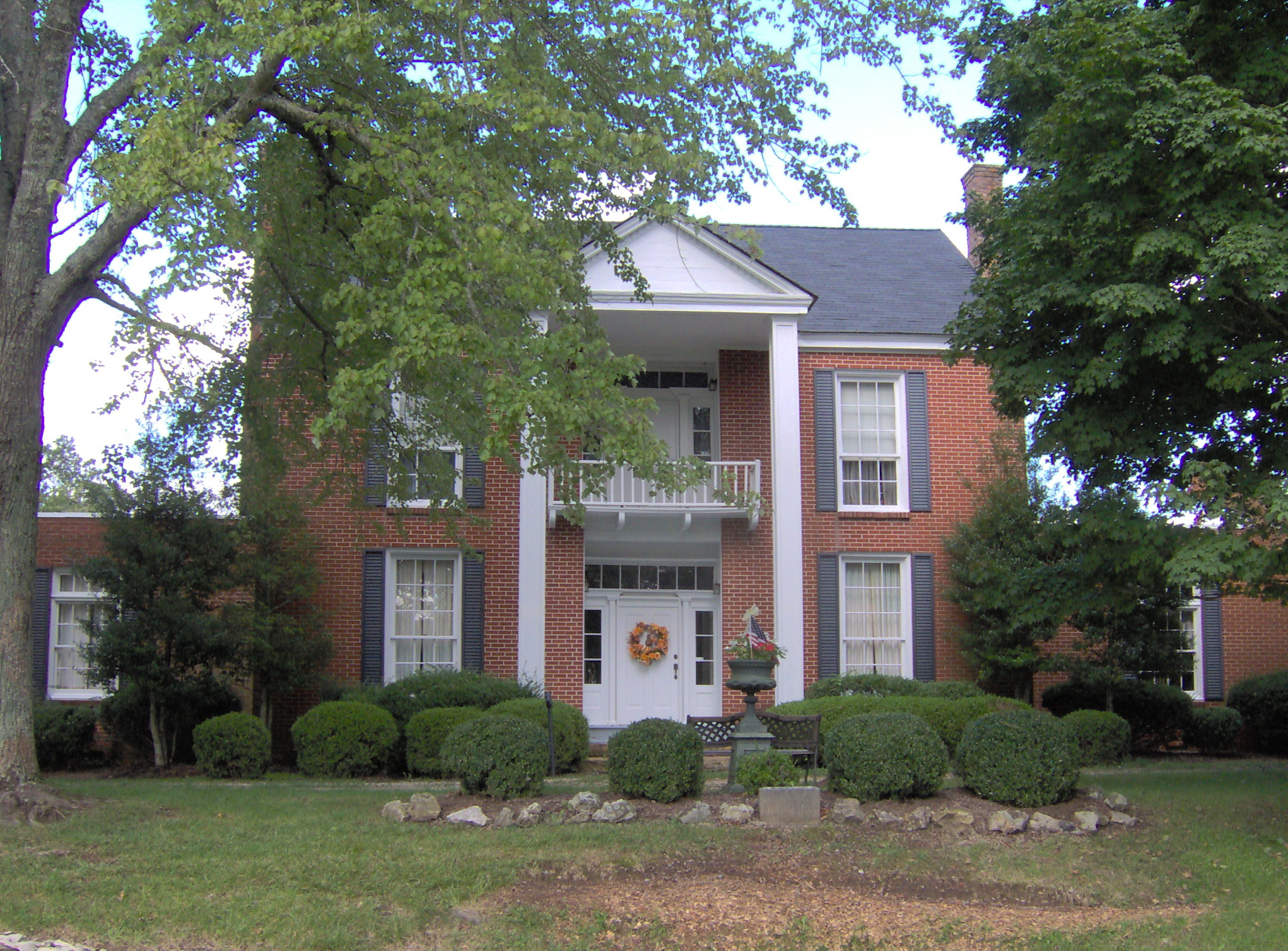

- Location within Tennessee Location within the United States
- Location: 2700 Old Walton Road
- Nearest city: Cookeville, Tennessee
- Coordinates: 36°10′49″N 85°27′0″W
- Area: 15 acres (6.1 ha)
- Built: circa 1848
- NRHP reference No.: 09000538
- Added to NRHP: August 11, 2009

White Plains is an antebellum plantation house located in Algood, Tennessee near the U.S. city of Cookeville. In the 19th century, the plantation provided a key stopover along the Walton Road, an early stagecoach road connecting Knoxville and Nashville, and in 1854 served as a temporary county seat for the newly formed Putnam County. In 2009, the house was added to the National Register of Historic Places.

The White Plains plantation was established in 1809 by William Quarles (1752–1814), a Revolutionary War veteran who had migrated to the area from Virginia. Quarles' grandson, Stephan Decatur Burton (1813–1892), built the White Plains house sometime around 1848, and in the late 1950s Harvey Draper bought the house and made numerous renovations.

== Location ==
White Plains is located on the eastern Highland Rim, a plateau-like upland between the higher Cumberland Plateau to the east and the lower Nashville Basin to the west. The western escarpments of the Cumberland Plateau, known locally as "Algood Mountain" and "Buck Mountain," rise about a mile to the east. The house stands along Old Walton Road just outside the municipal boundary of Algood.

== History ==
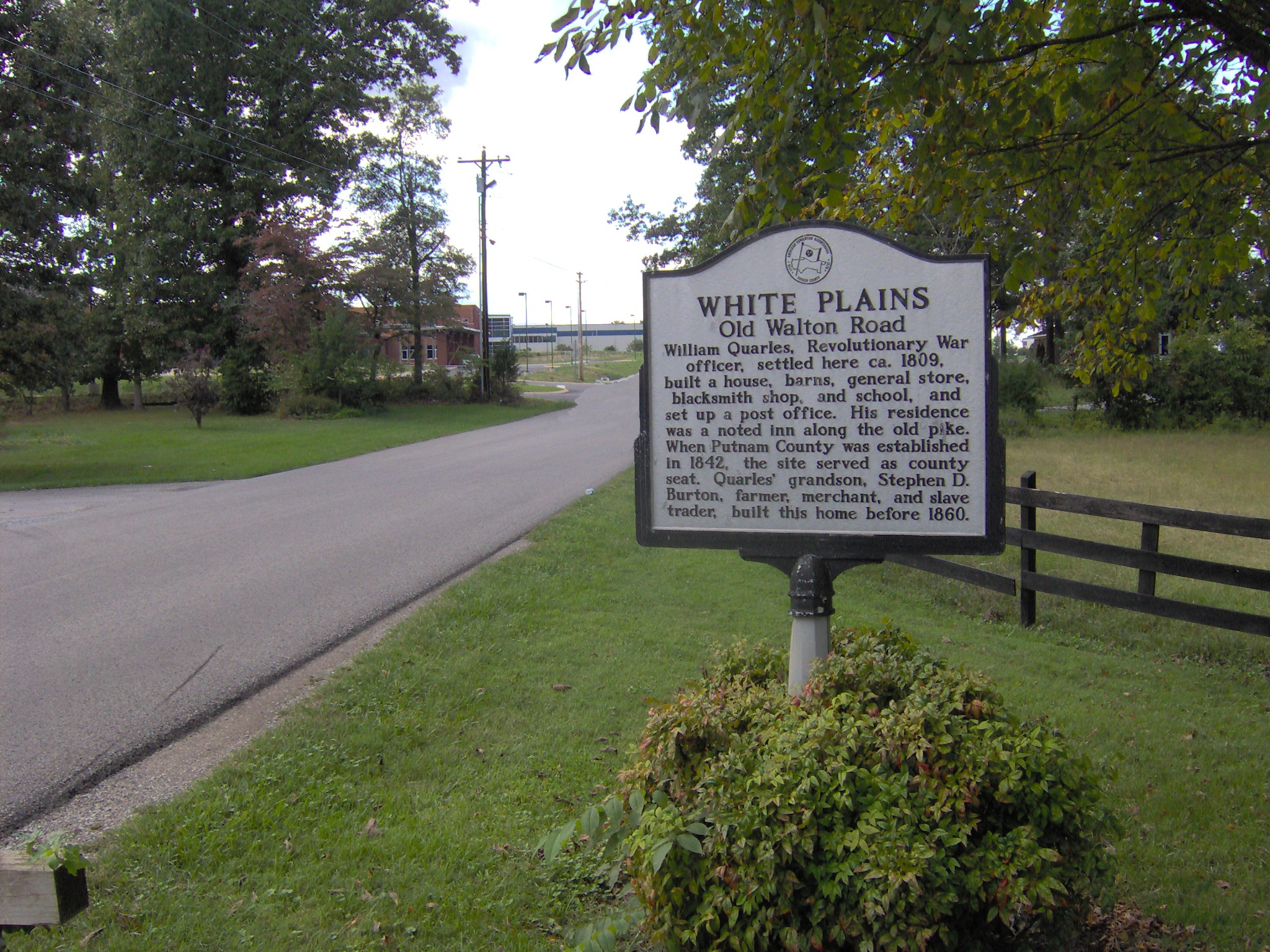
THC marker along Old Walton Road

What is now White Plains was part of Cherokee lands ceded to the United States with the signing of the Third Treaty of Tellico in 1805. The Walton Road, a stagecoach road completed in 1801 connecting Knoxville and Nashville, brought the earliest permanent legal settlers to the Upper Cumberland region. Around 1804, an early pioneer named Daniel Alexander established an inn along the Walton Road at what is now White Plains. In 1808, Alexander sold the inn and land to William Quarles, a lawyer and Revolutionary War veteran from Bedford County, Virginia. Quarles moved his family, belongings, and thirty slaves to the new land in December 1809. According to family tradition, Quarles named the land "White Plains," as the waves of prairie grass appeared white in the winter sunlight as Quarles looked out over the land from the edge of the Cumberland Plateau.

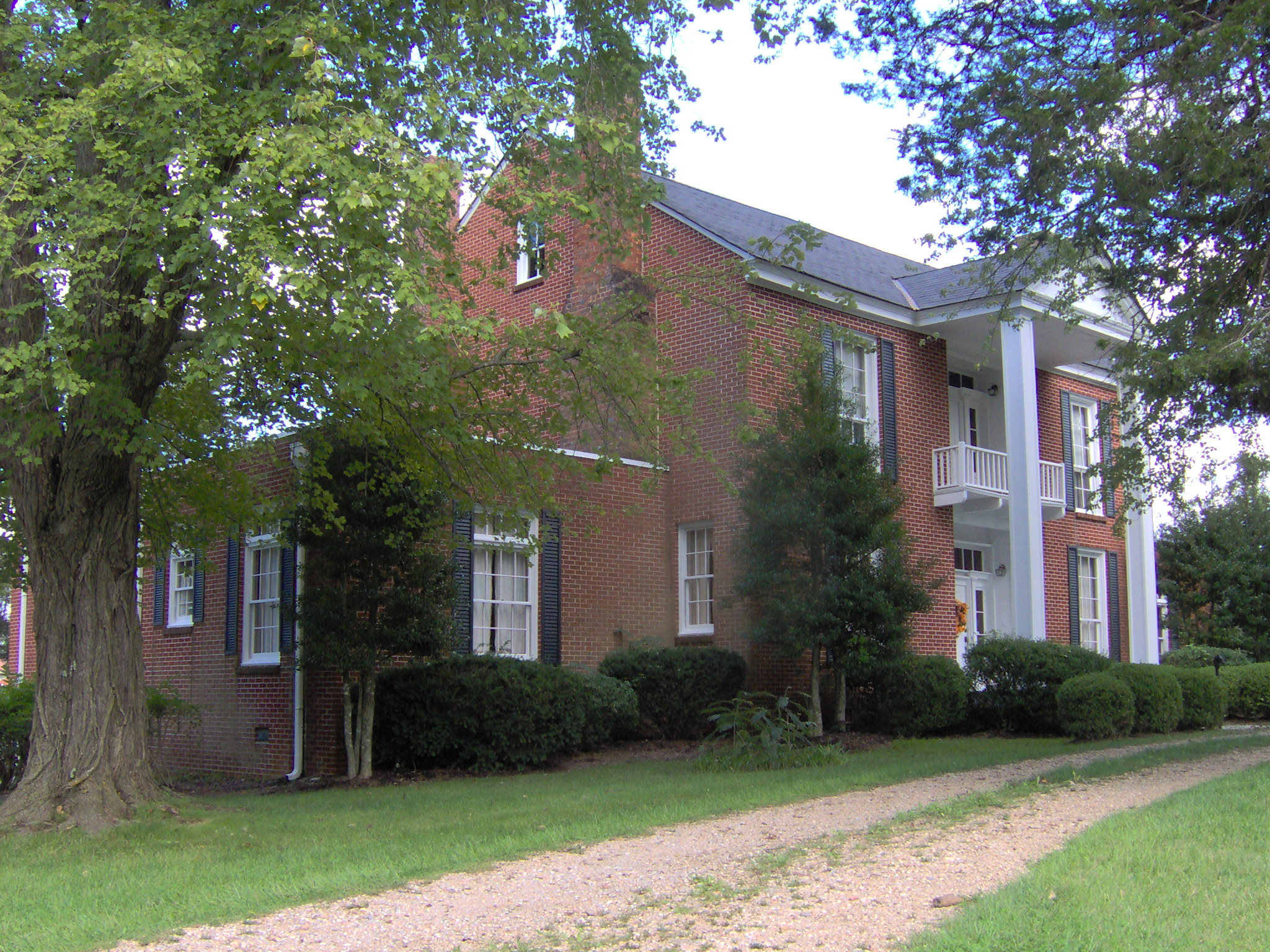
House at White Plains, originally built in 1848 and remodeled in 1958

Shortly after his arrival, Quarles built a two-story log house with a detached kitchen and office, and several slave cabins. Within a few years, Quarles had established a general store, blacksmith shop, and post office at White Plains. The Kentucky Stock Road, a cattle drovers' path connecting Huntsville, Alabama and Danville, Kentucky, was developed in subsequent years and intersected the Walton Road at White Plains. The Quarles' inn was a popular stopover for travellers along these two roads, and three U.S. presidents— Andrew Jackson, James K. Polk, and Andrew Johnson— are known to have lodged at White Plains. Quarles's youngest son, John Adams Quarles (1802–1876), may have inspired author Mark Twain's story, "The Jumping Frog of Calaveras County" (John Quarles was married to Twain's aunt, Martha Lampton). Quarles's daughter, Sallie, was married to U.S. Congressman Adam Huntsman, famous in Tennessee history for defeating Davy Crockett in the 1834 election and prompting Crockett's angry departure to Texas.

On April 2, 1814, William P. Quarles was murdered by a man named William Phillips. His wife, Ann Hawes Quarles, continued to manage White Plains until her death in 1844, when the land passed to Stephen Decatur Burton (1813–1892), a grandson of William and Ann. Burton built the present house at White Plains in 1848, and built a two-story schoolhouse for the small community's children. Largely through inheritance, Burton was one of the Upper Cumberland's largest slaveholders, owning around 100 slaves at the outbreak of the Civil War in 1861. During the war, Burton lost the bulk of his fortune when Union forces burned several warehouses in Chattanooga, where Burton had amassed $125,000 worth of cotton.

In the latter half of the 19th century, the community around White Plains disintegrated, although the house and farm remained in the hands of the Quarles-Burton family. The family eventually sold the house to Harvey Draper, who remodeled the house in the late 1950s. In 2018, the City of Algood purchased White Plains with plans to turn it into a museum.

== House and outbuildings ==
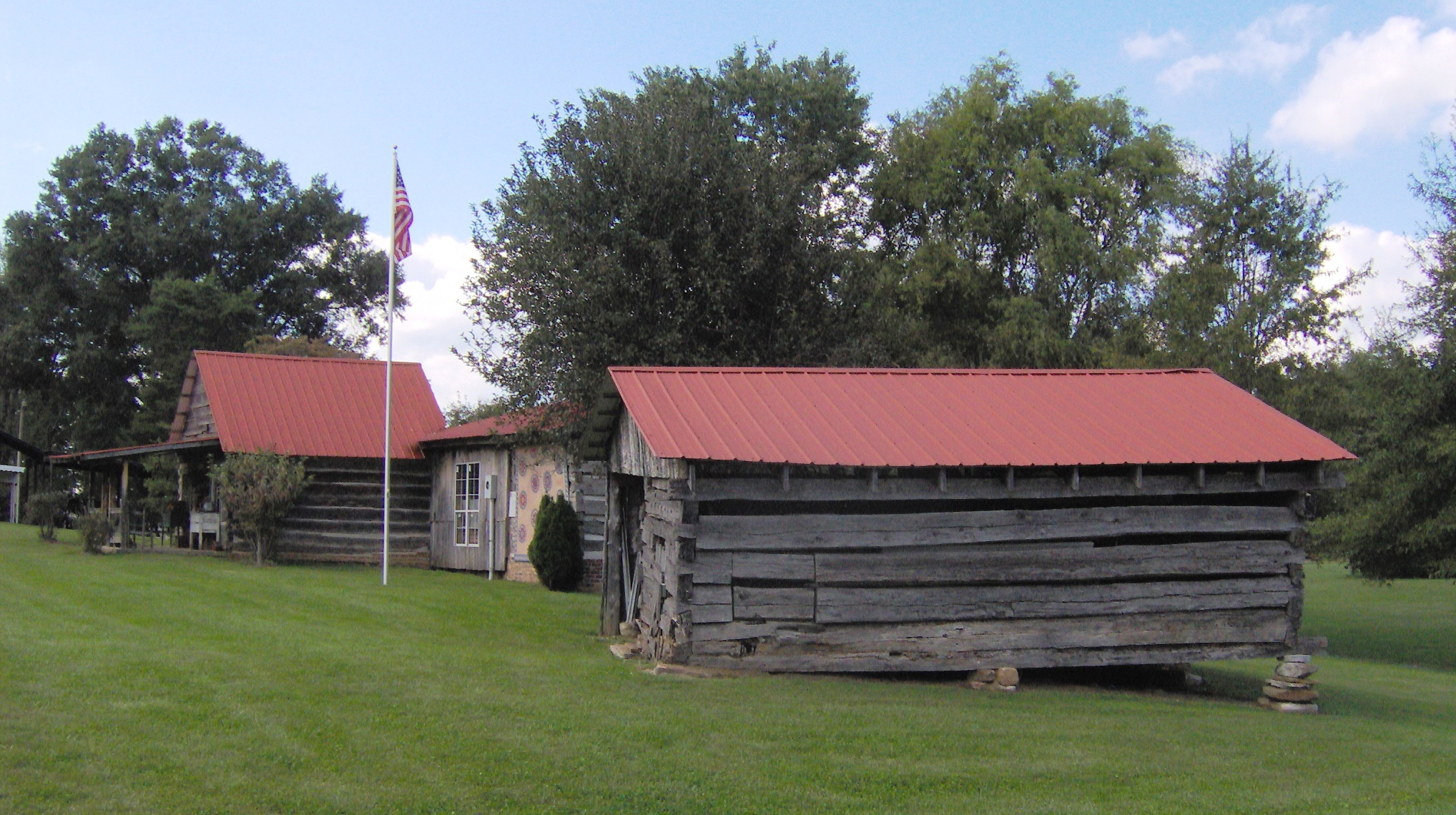
Smokehouse, now a log cabin (left) and corn crib (right) at White Plains

The house at White Plains was originally constructed in 1848 by Stephen Decatur Burton after the loghouse built by his grandfather William Quarles burned. The house originally consisted of a hewn log frame with weatherboard siding, built around a central floor plan. Two 15-foot (4.6 m) by 15-foot (4.6 m) rooms flank both sides of the central hallway on the first floor, and the second floor consists of four 15-foot (4.6 m) by 15-foot (4.6 m). A sitting room was added to the rear of the house in 1925. The 1958 renovations included the addition of a brick exterior, a front portico, and two single-story wings containing a kitchen and several bedrooms.

The interior of the house originally consisted of poplar floors, although the poplar floor on the first story was covered with hardwood in 1958. The original rooms all had a fireplace, each with a unique mantel. A "dog-leg" staircase accesses the second story. The first-story hallway has built-in gun cabinets and a 19th-century pier mirror (the latter added in 1958).

Outbuildings at White Plains include a smokehouse, corn crib, and horse barn. The smokehouse, built with dovetail-notched logs around 1860, was remodeled as a log cabin in 1990. The corn crib, a log structure built around 1860, was moved from its original location around 1950, and now sits partially collapsed next to the smokehouse. The horse barn is a modern structure built around 2000, with wooden walls and a metal roof. The Quarles and Burton family cemeteries are located opposite the junction of Old Walton Road and Deck Mountain Road, a few blocks from the house.
