= Jack Norton (filmmaker) =

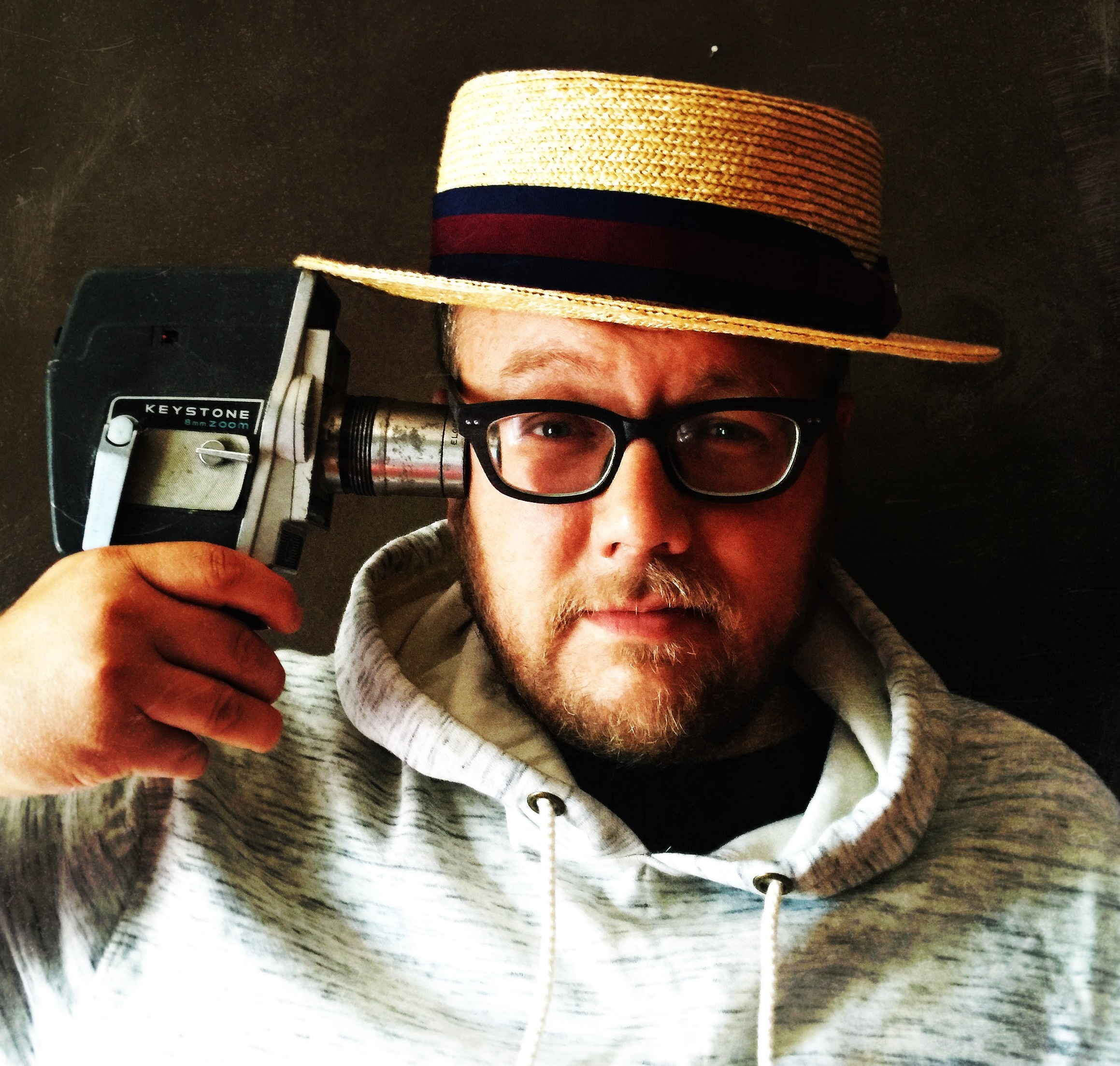
Filmmaker/artist Jack Norton, with 8mm camera.

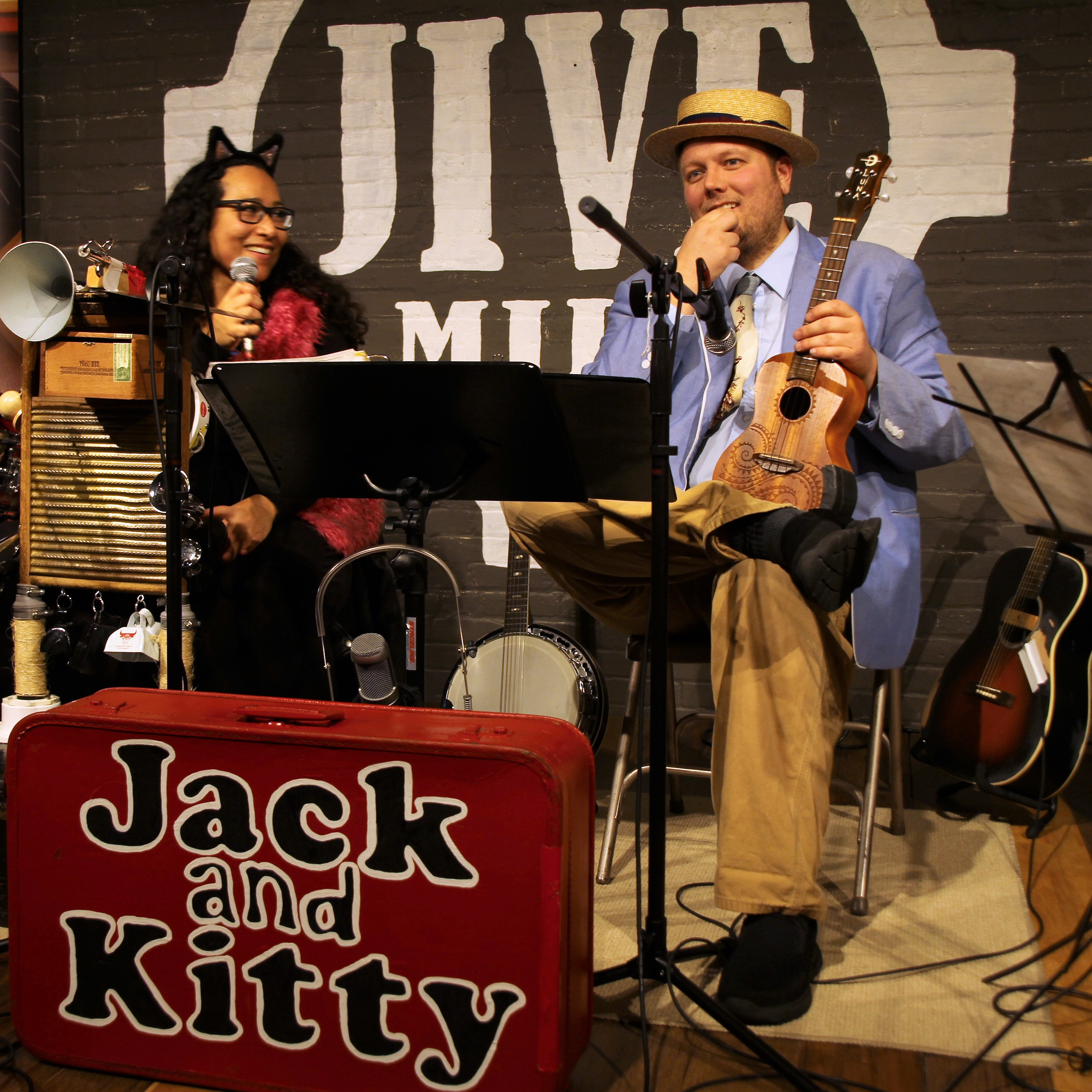
Jack and Kitty playing in Rochester, Minnesota

Jack Norton is an American filmmaker, television producer, musician, songwriter, and author. He is the director of the 2015 film Jug Band Hokum. He is best known as the co-creator of the Emmy Award-winning preschool television show and brand, (The Zinghoppers). He co-directed and co-starred in the PBS show, "Totally, Zinghoppers!"

Norton is of Dutch and French descent. He grew up in a musical family. His babysitter was Tiny Tim, who gave Norton his first ukulele. Blues singer Leon Redbone taught Norton how to play guitar and authors Nick Tosches and Hubert Selby, Jr. were family friends.

After high school, Norton studied Early Childhood Education and his experience as a preschool teacher helped form the educational principals found in the Zinghoppers music. Norton's senior thesis (entitled, "The Childhood Dignity Movement"), helped form the Zinghoppers core goals of "educating, entertaining and engaging" young children. While in college, Norton's love of hip-hop culture and dance music led him to attend raves and underground rap house parties. Electro, hip-hop, Disney pop and dance music serves as the basis of Norton's musical influences.

The Nortons moved to Nashville, Tennessee in 2009 to begin production of "Totally, Zinghoppers!", a series for public television.

In 2015 Norton announced his directorial debut with Jug Band Hokum, a documentary film that stars Brooklynd Turner and Anne Baggenstoss and follows the lives of band members competing in the Minneapolis Annual Battle of the Jug Bands. Guests appearing in the film include Garrison Keillor (of Prairie Home Companion fame), Bone Thugs-N-Harmony and others.

In 2017 it was announced Norton's next film will be Infinite Chaos, a feature-length horror film.

Four songs written and performed by Jack Norton and Kitty Norton are included in The Florida Project a 2017 film by Sean Baker.

Jack's work as a musicologist and historian has led him to publish biographies on Emmett Miller, Freddie Fisher (Schnickelfritz) and Stan Fritts of the Korn Kobblers. His work "Cornstars: Rube Music In Swing Time" earned the prestigious Certificate of Merit for “Best Historical Research in Recorded Popular Music” from the Association for Recorded Sound Collections. Norton's best-selling series, "Dirty Little Comics" is a pictorial history of Tijuana bibles and underground adult comics from the 1920s through the 1950s.
