= Floyd Ray Cook shootings and manhunt =

2015 fugitive manhunt in Tennessee

Floyd Ray Cook manhunt
- Location: Cumberland County, Kentucky, Putnam County, Tennessee
- Date: October 24–30, 2015
- Target: Police officers attempting to arrest him
- Weapon: Pistol
- Deaths: 1 (the perpetrator)
- Injuries: 1 (police officer)

The Floyd Ray Cook manhunt started on Saturday afternoon, October 24, 2015, and lasted nearly a week, when 62-year-old Floyd Ray Cook of Lebanon, Kentucky shot a City of Algood, TN officer who had stopped to help Cook in Putnam County, Tennessee believing him to be a stranded motorist and ended 12:20 a.m. early Friday morning, October 30, 2015, when Floyd Cook was shot and killed in Cumberland County, Kentucky, 7 miles south of Burkesville on U.S. Route 61. The agencies involved were the FBI, U.S. Marshals, Kentucky State Police, Tennessee Bureau of Investigation, and local police officers. Helicopters and thermal-heat detecting technology were used in this massive manhunt.

== Events ==
=== Initial confrontation ===
After an August bench warrant for "failure to appear" in court over a methamphetamines charge was issued by a Circuit Judge from Hardin County, Kentucky, months went by as Floyd Cook hovered under the radar as a wanted man, until Saturday, October 24, 2015.

On that Saturday afternoon, in Algood, Tennessee, a small town on Interstate 40 midway between Nashville and Knoxville, Ahscari Valencia, an Algood police officer, stopped to help a black Ford F-150 believing the occupants to be stranded.

As Valencia walked towards the truck, Cook fired multiple shots from his handgun, hitting Officer Valencia in the abdomen portion of his bulletproof vest. Valencia lived. Cook fled north towards Kentucky. Heading north into Kentucky on the west side of Dale Hollow Lake, Cook fled in his black F-150 truck on back roads, where he encountered Jeremy Baker, a Kentucky State Police officer, about 50 miles north of Algood. Baker tried to stop the black Ford F-150, but Cook kept on running, turned onto a side road that dead ended, which caused Cook to crash his truck. At 5:04pm, shots were reported fired, radioed in by Baker. Neither Cook nor Baker were wounded after the shootout. Cook then proceeded to flee on foot, disappearing into the wooded foothills.

=== Warrant ===
The outstanding warrant for Floyd Ray Cook's arrest stemmed from trafficking methamphetamines and tampering with evidence charges in Hardin County, Kentucky.

On June 27, 2015, Floyd Ray Cook was arrested by the Hardin County Sheriff Department in Elizabethtown, Kentucky, after a traffic stop discovered that Cook possessed methamphetamines, and charged him with first degree trafficking and tampering with physical evidence, because he tried to destroy them. Cook was released on a $75,000 partially secured bond. A month later, he failed to appear in Hardin County Circuit Court, so the Circuit Court Judge issued a bench warrant for his arrest.

=== Developments ===
A special team for the Kentucky State Police arrived on the scene by Saturday night and resumed their search on Sunday, when a young man called police saying he had seen Cook enter his father's (James Boles) house on 963 Dulworth Road, about a mile and a half from where Cook had wrecked his truck the day before, in Cumberland County. Many tear gas canisters were fired into the house by the authorities, but Cook could not be found.

On Sunday night, the manhunt was called off due to weather and darkness.

For three days, Monday, Tuesday, and Wednesday, Cumberland County Public Schools were closed down by the order of the Superintendent Kirk Biggerstaff.

Eventually, the FBI and U.S. Marshals joined in. The Tennessee Bureau of Investigation offered a $1,000 reward.

On Tuesday, 1:30 p.m., the 963 Dulworth Road house a few miles south of Burkesville that Floyd Cook was thought to have been located at earlier on Sunday, burned to the ground for mysterious, and intentional, reasons.

On Wednesday, 8 p.m., 35 year old Katy McCarty and her boyfriend 50 year old Troy Wayne were arrested in connection to Cook, although they were found in White House, Tennessee, just north of Nashville, by a US Marshal many miles away from Cookeville or Burksville, where the initial debacle unfolded. Floyd Cook never left the forest-covered mountains of Cumberland County, Kentucky, after crashing his F-150. During their getaway, Wayne and McCarty rammed 2 police cars, a US Marshal shot at them, missed, and then they drove through the small town of White House. Wayne and McCarty eventually drove down a dead end cul-de-sac street in a suburb, crashed their vehicle, and proceeded to run by foot through the surrounding cornfields. McCarty was found in the mud near the cornfield, and Wayne was found several blocks away, walking on the sidewalk.

=== Killing of Cook ===
On Thursday, October 29, 2015, Cook showed up at a local Kentucky man's house in the afternoon. His sister was about to leave his house, and as she was clicking her keys to unlock her car, she thought she spotted a shadow by the garage. When she looked up, Floyd Cook was standing in front of her, next to a post, next to the garage. Floyd Cook wouldn't identify himself, and told the woman, "I mean you no harm. I just need a drink of water. I mean you no harm." The woman and her brother speculated that Cook could have been an undercover police officer, but called 9-1-1 anyway.

On Route 61 in Cumberland County, Floyd Cook spotted an arriving cruiser and ran into the woods, again. State troopers and a U.S. Marshal fired shots, killing Cook. The names of the men who killed Cook have not been released to the press yet.

== Perpetrator ==
Cook had been convicted of various crimes, such as assault, robbery, and rioting through the 1970s and 80s. In 1971, Floyd was convicted of raping a girl under the age of 12 when he was 17 years old, and had to register as a sexual predator after that. Cook was described as a fugitive rapist by NBC News.
