= Gerald D. Coorts Memorial Arboretum =

Arboretum in Cookeville, Tennessee, US

Coordinates: 36.17460°N 85.50403°W

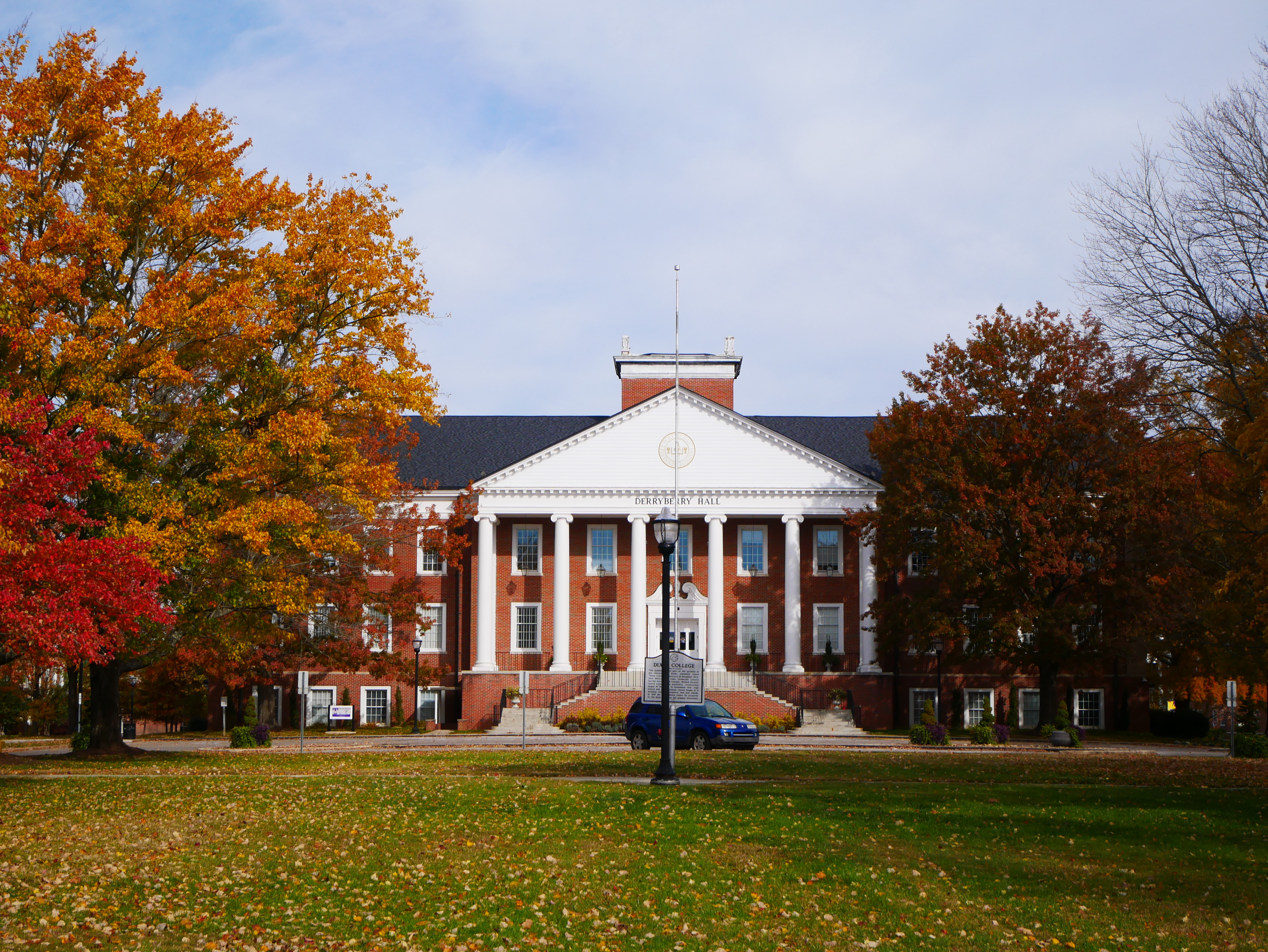
- Arboretum on the grounds around Oakley Hall and Derryberry Hall
- Interactive map of Gerald D. Coorts Memorial Arboretum
- Type: Arboretum
- Location: Cookeville, Tennessee
- Website: Official website

The Gerald D. Coorts Memorial Arboretum is an arboretum located in Cookeville, Tennessee. It is affiliated with Tennessee Tech.

The arboretum was dedicated in 1997 to honor Dr. Gerald Coorts, former dean of Tennessee Tech's College of Agriculture and Home Economics. It currently contains more than 150 trees, shrubs, and flowering plants, representing approximately 60 species.

== See also ==
- List of botanical gardens in the United States
