= Jug Band Hokum =

- Directed by: Jack Norton
- Starring: Brooklynd Turner; Anne Baggenstoss
- Release date: April 25, 2015 (Mid West Music Fest)
- Country: United States

Jug Band Hokum is a 2015 feature-length documentary film by Jack Norton that stars Brooklynd Turner and Anne Baggenstoss. It follows the eccentric lives of band members competing in the annual Minneapolis Battle of the Jug Bands.

The film features appearances by Garrison Keillor (of Prairie Home Companion), Bone Thugs-N-Harmony, Charlie Parr, Dom Flemons of the Carolina Chocolate Drops, and Baby Gramps among others.
