= Freddie Fisher (musician) =

American musician and bandleader (1904–1967)

Freddie Fisher (11 June 1904 – 28 March 1967) was an American musician, leader of a band variously known simply as the Freddie Fisher Band, Freddie Fisher and His Schnickelfritz Orchestra (The word schnickelfritz is an affectionate term of German origin for "a mischievous little boy"; comparable to scamp.), or Colonel Corn and His Band. The band, which first made its name in Minnesota, was essentially a novelty act, influenced by such vaudeville performers as Clayton, Jackson, and Durante. His deliberately corny approach to songs was a precursor to Spike Jones.

Hits in Billboard's early (pre-1944) country music charts include "Horsey, Keep Your Tail Up", "Sugar Loaf Waltz" and "They Go Wild, Simply Wild Over Me".

Fisher was born in 1904 in Lourdes, Iowa (near Garnavillo, Iowa) and died in 1967 in Aspen, Colorado. He appeared in at least nine films between 1938 and 1949. The latter part of his life was lived in Aspen, where he ran a repair shop called Fisher the Fixer and played in a band that included his son King Fisher.

"Cornstars: Rube Music in Swing Time", a biography from author/filmmaker Jack Norton, has been an Amazon best-seller and earned the prestigious Certificate of Merit for “Best Historical Research in Recorded Popular Music” from the Association for Recorded Sound Collections.

== Films ==
- Turkey in the Straw (1941), a soundie
