= Zinghoppers =

- Origin: University of Minnesota and the Mayo Clinic.
- Years active: 2007–present

The Zinghoppers are a multi-platform children's brand that focuses on creating content for preschoolers and families. The show includes three animal characters: Olo, Coconuts and Penelope. The Zinghoppers have released CDs, DVDs and maintain an active international tour schedule.

The characters and songs were developed by a team of Early Childhood Educators from the University of Minnesota and the Mayo Clinic.

In 2007, the Zinghoppers performed their first professional shows at the Mall of America, Minnesota State Fair, South Dakota State Fair, and released their first CD, "Hop, Hop, Hop". Later that year, the band relocated from Minneapolis, Minnesota to Phoenix, Arizona to film a season of The Zinghoppers Show for a local Arizona Public Broadcasting Service (PBS) Public television station affiliate. This series was very low-budget and is currently out of circulation.

The Zinghoppers moved to Nashville in 2009 and were instantly popular with families and many local celebrities. Nicole Kidman, Keith Urban, Brad Paisley, Kimberly Williams-Paisley and members of Kings of Leon have all been spotted in the audience of Zinghoppers shows. In 2012 the group performed two sold out shows at the historic Franklin Theatre and Mike Wolfe, star of American Pickers brought his family to the show. The group was named "Nashville's Best Kids' Entertainers" for an unprecedented four years in a row (2009, 2010, 2011 and 2012) by the readers of Parents magazine.

In 2011, the band toured on behalf of the US Pentagon on a 19 country world tour - performing for US military families serving in Europe, the Mediterranean and the Middle East. That same year, the Zinghoppers hosted the first-ever web concert for families at the Kennedy Center for Performing Arts in Washington DC. They are the only children's group ever invited to play the legendary Bluebird Cafe in Nashville, TN.

The success of their YouTube music video, "Tooty Ta", and their local popularity led to an interstitial series on Nashville Public Television. "Totally, Zinghoppers!" debuted in late 2011. The series is created, produced and funded independently by the Zinghoppers production team. It is known for being quirky and fiercely independent with both lyrics and visual spoofs inspired by a wide range of pop culture icons including: Soul Train, Taylor Swift, the Black Eyed Peas and Bob Dylan music videos.

Season 1 earned three EMMY Award nominations, with the team winning "Best Children's Program". The series was quickly picked up by additional PBS member stations nationwide. Currently, over 100 PBS member stations broadcast the series. AFN Family, KidzBop On Demand and Trinity Broadcasting Network each broadcast the series as well, bringing the band to nearly 1 million viewers in over 195 countries daily.

During the filming of season one, the group filmed additional web-only bonus content backstage at Bridgestone Arena during the Justin Bieber North American leg of the wildly successful My World Tour. The band re-shot their viral video hit "Tooty Ta" with popular Radio Disney rock band Allstar Weekend. Additional collaborations included a viral video hit with Mindless Behavior.

The series picked up another two EMMY Award nominations in late 2012 for "Best Children's Program" and "Best Interstitial Series". It was announced that Season 2 would film in early 2013.

== Works ==
=== Albums ===
- Snowflakes (2007)
- Hop, Hop, Hop (2007)
- Toot! Toot! All Aboard! (2008)
- A Zinghoppy Concert (2009)
- Be Creative At Your Library (2009)
- Sing Your Way Through The Day (2009)
- Splish Splash (2010)
- One World, Many Stories (2010)
- One World, Many Songs (2011)
- You Are Special! (2011)
- Meet The Zinghoppers - EP (2011)
- Songs From The Hit TV Show! (2012)

=== Home Videos ===
- A Dance Party Concert! (2010)
- Rock, Bop & Zinghop! (2012)

=== TV Series ===
- Hop With The Zinghoppers (2007) - 13 interstitial episodes
- Totally, Zinghoppers (2011/2012) - 26 interstitial episodes

== General references ==
- Crawford, Jim (7 November 2007). "Zinghoppers invade Valley to kids’ delight". The Desert Advocate Newspaper, Carefree, Arizona.
- Woodward, Erica (6 May 2009). "Nashville's most Famous Musicians...if you are under 5". The Tennessean, Nashville, Tennessee.
- Mayes, Angie (15 November 2012). "Franklin's Zinghoppers make kids, moms happy". Franklin Life, Franklin, Tennessee.
