= Algood, Tennessee =

- City
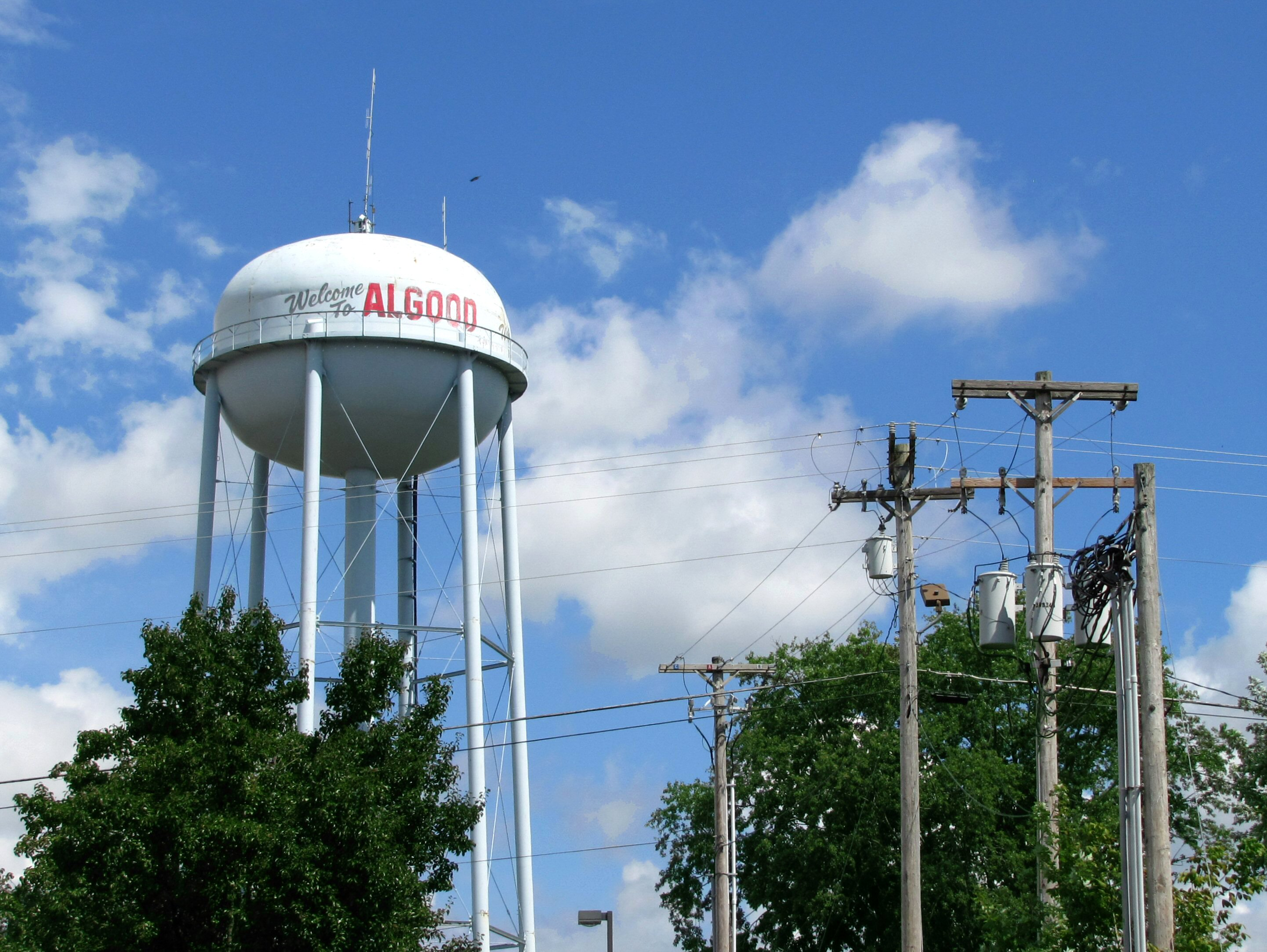

- Location of Algood in Putnam County, Tennessee.
- Coordinates: 36°11′51″N 85°26′54″W
- Country: United States
- State: Tennessee
- County: Putnam
- Incorporated: 1911
- Named after: Joel Algood

Area
  - Total: 4.09 sq mi (10.59 km^{2})
  - Land: 4.09 sq mi (10.59 km^{2})
  - Water: 0 sq mi (0.00 km^{2})
- Elevation: 1,112 ft (339 m)

Population (2020)
  - Total: 3,963
  - Density: 969.0/sq mi (374.15/km^{2})
- Time zone: UTC-6 (Central (CST))
  - Summer (DST): UTC-5 (CDT)
- ZIP code: 38506
- Area code: 931
- FIPS code: 47-00640
- GNIS feature ID: 1304798
- Website: algood-tn.com

Algood is a city in Putnam County, Tennessee, United States. The population was 3,963 at the 2020 census. It is part of the Cookeville Micropolitan Statistical Area.

== History ==
While Algood was not established until the late 19th century, in the early 19th century a small community developed just south of modern Algood at White Plains, an antebellum plantation and important stopover along the Walton Road (which connected Nashville and Knoxville). In the 1880s, the Nashville & Knoxville Railroad erected a depot at what is now Algood. The land on which the depot was built was purchased from a circuit rider and early settler named Joel Algood, and thus the train stop was named after him. For a period of time the area would be called Algood's Old Fields. In 1899, the Algood Methodist Church (now Algood United Methodist Church) was built on land donated by the children of this early settler. Algood was initially incorporated in 1901, but repealed its own charter two years later. The town reincorporated in 1911.

== Geography ==
The town is situated at the base of Algood Mountain (el. 1,456 feet (444 m)), one of a series of low, wide ridges in the area that present as "stair steps" from the Highland Rim to the Cumberland Plateau. Algood is centered along the former State Route 42 (Main Street), a state highway designation which no longer exists, just east of the road's two junctions with State Route 111.

According to the United States Census Bureau, the town has a total area of 4.0 square miles (10 km^{2}), all land.

== Demographics ==
Historical population
Census	Pop.	Note	%±
1920	651		—
1930	643		−1.2%
1940	609		−5.3%
1950	729		19.7%
1960	886		21.5%
1970	1,808		104.1%
1980	2,406		33.1%
1990	2,399		−0.3%
2000	2,942		22.6%
2010	3,495		18.8%
2020	3,963		13.4%

=== 2020 census ===
Racial composition as of the 2020 census
Race	Number	Percent
White	3,418	86.2%
Black or African American	117	3.0%
American Indian and Alaska Native	32	0.8%
Asian	69	1.7%
Native Hawaiian and Other Pacific Islander	2	0.1%
Some other race	80	2.0%
Two or more races	245	6.2%
Hispanic or Latino (of any race)	196	4.9%

As of the 2020 census, Algood had a population of 3,963, with 1,748 households and 1,138 families residing in the city. The median age was 37.9 years; 22.0% of residents were under the age of 18 and 17.5% were 65 years of age or older. For every 100 females there were 88.4 males, and for every 100 females age 18 and over there were 83.7 males age 18 and over.

96.4% of residents lived in urban areas, while 3.6% lived in rural areas.

Of the 1,748 households in Algood, 28.6% had children under the age of 18 living in them. Of all households, 38.4% were married-couple households, 18.3% were households with a male householder and no spouse or partner present, and 36.6% were households with a female householder and no spouse or partner present. About 34.4% of all households were made up of individuals and 14.5% had someone living alone who was 65 years of age or older.

There were 1,935 housing units, of which 9.7% were vacant. The homeowner vacancy rate was 3.3% and the rental vacancy rate was 8.8%.

=== 2000 census ===
As of the 2000 census, there were 2,942 people, 1,181 households, and 792 families residing in the town. The population density was 766.9 inhabitants per square mile (296.1/km^{2}). There were 1,263 housing units at an average density of 329.2 per square mile (127.1/km^{2}). The racial makeup of the town was 93.13% White, 4.93% African American, 0.07% Native American, 0.41% Asian, 0.24% from other races, and 1.22% from two or more races. Hispanic or Latino of any race were 1.09% of the population.

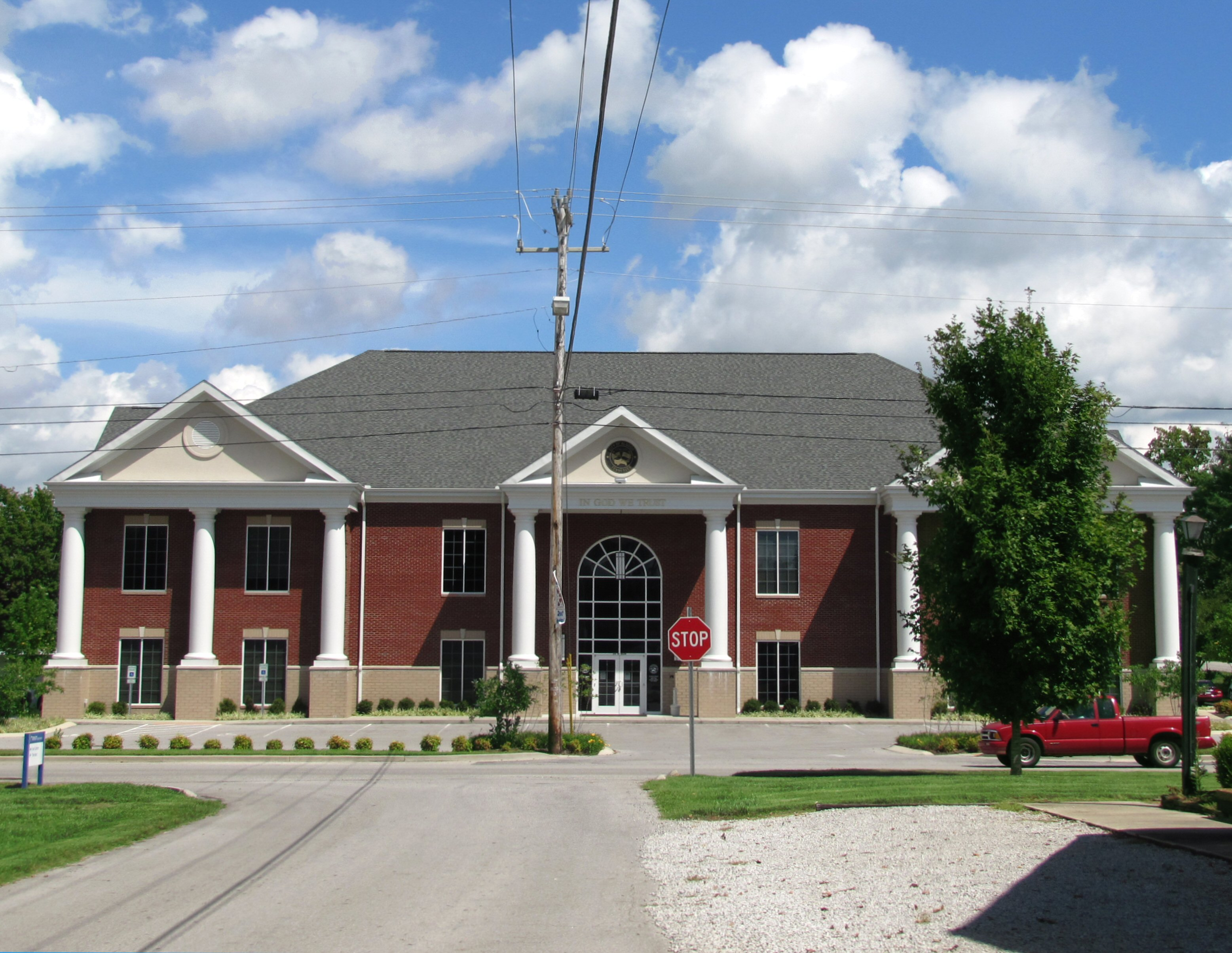
City of Algood Municipal Building

There were 1,181 households, out of which 29.8% had children under the age of 18 living with them, 48.7% were married couples living together, 14.9% had a female householder with no husband present, and 32.9% were non-families. 30.1% of all households were made up of individuals, and 12.4% had someone living alone who was 65 years of age or older. The average household size was 2.35 and the average family size was 2.87.

In the town the population was spread out, with 22.6% under the age of 18, 8.7% from 18 to 24, 29.2% from 25 to 44, 20.7% from 45 to 64, and 18.8% who were 65 years of age or older. The median age was 37 years. For every 100 females, there were 79.2 males. For every 100 females age 18 and over, there were 74.3 males.

The median income for a household in the town was $27,205, and the median income for a family was $34,234. Males had a median income of $32,443 versus $22,872 for females. The per capita income for the town was $15,478. About 12.5% of families and 15.5% of the population were below the poverty line, including 19.7% of those under age 18 and 14.0% of those age 65 or over.

== See also ==
- Floyd Ray Cook shootings and manhunt, started in Algood in 2015
