= WUCT =

News/talk radio station in Algood–Cookeville, Tennessee

- Algood, Tennessee; United States
- Broadcast area: Cookeville, Tennessee
- Frequency: 1600 kHz
- Branding: NewsTalk 94.1

Programming
- Format: News/Talk

Ownership
- Owner: JWC Broadcasting

History
- First air date: June 22, 1981; 44 years ago (as WRZK at 1590)
- Former call signs: WRZK (1981–1983); WWRT (1983–1990); WATX (1990–2017)
- Former frequencies: 1590 kHz (1981–2008)
- Call sign meaning: Where Upper Cumberland Talks

Technical information
- Licensing authority: FCC
- Facility ID: 39797
- Class: D (AM & FM)
- Power: 2,500 watts day 20 watts night (AM)
- ERP: 250 watts (FM)
- HAAT: 25 meters (82 ft)
- Transmitter coordinates: 36°11′2.00″N 85°25′3.00″W
- Translator: 94.1 W231DG (Cookeville)

Links
- Public license information: Public file; LMS
- Webcast: Listen Live
- Website: newstalk941.com

WUCT (1600 AM, "NewsTalk 94.1") is a radio station licensed to Algood, Tennessee, United States, the station serves the Cookeville area. The station is currently owned by Jwc Broadcasting.

== History ==
The station went on the air as WRZK on June 22, 1981. On June 1, 1983, the station changed its call sign to WWRT, and on January 15, 1990 to WATX. WATX originally broadcast on 1590 kilohertz, and later moved to 1600. The station subsequently added a translator on 100.9 FM, known as W265BC (WATX-FM unofficially).

In January 2017, WATX rebranded as "NewsTalk 94.1" (switching translators to W231DG 94.1 FM Cookeville). On January 1, 2017, WATX changed callsigns to WUCT.
