= 1570 AM =

AM radio frequency

The following radio stations broadcast on AM frequency 1570 kHz: 1570 AM is a Mexican clear-channel frequency, with XERF Ciudad Acuña, Coahuila, as the dominant Class A station. See List of broadcast station classes.

== Argentina ==
- LRI 223 in Lomas de Zamora, Buenos Aires (Still not active)
- Rocha in La Plata, Buenos Aires

== Brazil ==
- ZYH 621 in Senador Pompeu, Ceará
- ZYH 907 in Coroatá, Maranhão
- ZYL 242 in Itajubá, Minas Gerais
- ZYJ 341 in Nova Aurora, Paraná
- ZYJ 493 in Valença, Rio de Janeiro
- ZYK 358 in Gravataí, Rio Grande do Sul
- ZYJ 832 in Tangará, Santa Catarina
- ZYK 651 in Santo André, São Paulo
- ZYK 648 in Santa Rita do Passa Quatro, São Paulo

== Canada ==
- CJLV in Laval, Quebec - 10 kW, transmitter located at 45.530833°N 73.841389°W

== Guatemala ==
- TGVE in Guatemala City, Guatemala

== Mexico ==
Stations in bold are clear-channel stations.

- **XERF-AM** in Ciudad Acuña, Coahuila - 100 kW, transmitter located at 29.35°N 101.033333°W

== United States ==
Call sign	City of license	Facility ID	Class	Daytime power (kW)	Nighttime power (kW)	Unlimited power (kW)	Transmitter coordinates
KAKK	Walker, Minnesota	28655	B	9.5	0.25		47.078889°N 94.590278°W
KBCV	Hollister, Missouri	129517	B	5	3		36.614444°N 93.213611°W (daytime); 36.614167°N 93.213167°W (nighttime)
KCVR	Lodi, California	60424	B	1	0.5		38.086111°N 121.215833°W
KDIZ	Golden Valley, Minnesota	10828	B	4	0.22		44.988611°N 93.351944°W
KLEX	Lexington, Missouri	6507	D	0.25	0.04		39.187222°N 93.834167°W
KLLA	Leesville, Louisiana	52139	D	0.63	0.006		31.141111°N 93.295556°W
KMCD	Fairfield, Iowa	23040	D	0.25	0.11		41.005556°N 92.018611°W
KNDY	Marysville, Kansas	16913	D	0.25	0.033		39.857778°N 96.648889°W
KPYK	Terrell, Texas	43433	D	0.27	0.006		32.754722°N 96.239444°W
KTGE	Salinas, California	65375	B	5	0.5		36.660556°N 121.541389°W
KTUZ	Catoosa, Oklahoma	59978	D	1			36.265278°N 95.710278°W
KVLG	La Grange, Texas	21238	D	0.25	0.011		29.882778°N 96.865833°W
KVTK	Vermillion, South Dakota	14709	D	0.5	0.053		42.9225°N 97.065833°W
KXJJ	Loveland, Colorado	35517	D	1	0.04		40.493333°N 105.181389°W
KZWC	Webster City, Iowa	24660	D	0.232	0.137		42.467778°N 93.796667°W
WABL	Amite, Louisiana	2128	D	0.5	0.015		30.708611°N 90.525278°W
WBGX	Harvey, Illinois	40147	B	1.1	0.5		41.603889°N 87.679167°W
WBGZ	Alton, Illinois	41384	D	1	0.074		38.928056°N 90.2175°W
WCLE	Cleveland, Tennessee	55098	D	5	0.084		35.181944°N 84.848611°W
WCRL	Oneonta, Alabama	5888	D	2.5	0.064		33.954444°N 86.472222°W
WECU	Winterville, North Carolina	135909	B	8	0.2		35.5375°N 77.418333°W
WFLR	Dundee, New York	36407	B	1	0.44		42.544444°N 76.993056°W
WFRL	Freeport, Illinois	63135	B	5	0.21		42.3125°N 89.593889°W
WFTU	Riverhead, New York	18238	B	1	0.5		40.913333°N 72.654444°W
WFUR	Grand Rapids, Michigan	22916	B	1	0.307		42.953889°N 85.697778°W
WGLL	Auburn, Indiana	8076	D	0.5	0.151		41.333611°N 85.052222°W
WIGO	Morrow, Georgia	60918	D	5	0.05		33.601389°N 84.311111°W
WILO	Frankfort, Indiana	33468	B	0.25	0.25		40.277778°N 86.485278°W
WISP	Doylestown, Pennsylvania	48310	B	5	0.9		40.326111°N 75.161111°W
WIZK	Bay Springs, Mississippi	14022	D	3.2			31.965556°N 89.300833°W
WKBH	Holmen, Wisconsin	56617	B	1	0.36		43.923611°N 91.270556°W
WKKS	Vanceburg, Kentucky	7319	D	1			38.597222°N 83.347222°W
WLBQ	Morgantown, Kentucky	7904	D	1	0.15		37.219167°N 86.689167°W
WLEE	Winona, Mississippi	61280	D	1	0.025		33.464444°N 89.736389°W
WLKD	Minocqua, Wisconsin	55210	B	5	0.5		45.820278°N 89.724167°W
WLRS	New Albany, Indiana	14553	B	1.5	0.233		38.327778°N 85.782222°W
WMAK	Lobelville, Tennessee	27139	D	1	0.066		35.766944°N 87.831111°W
WNCA	Siler City, North Carolina	10664	B	5	0.28		35.727778°N 79.488333°W
WNST	Towson, Maryland	25523	B	5	0.237		39.417778°N 76.556389°W
WOKC	Okeechobee, Florida	50166	D	0.8	0.012		27.215833°N 80.811667°W
WPGM	Danville, Pennsylvania	43662	B	2.5	0.221		40.986111°N 76.626944°W
WPPC	Penuelas, Puerto Rico	52948	D	1	0.126		18.063056°N 66.717778°W
WPTW	Piqua, Ohio	70521	B			0.25	40.140278°N 84.268611°W
WSCO	Appleton, Wisconsin	72941	B	1	0.331		44.217778°N 88.409167°W
WSWV	Pennington Gap, Virginia	36893	B	2.3	0.191		36.733889°N 83.042778°W
WTAY	Robinson, Illinois	2270	D	0.25	0.188		39.008056°N 87.778056°W
WTLK	Taylorsville, North Carolina	28974	B	0.9	0.198		35.931667°N 81.171389°W (daytime); 35.9325°N 81.171944°W (nighttime)
WTRB	Ripley, Tennessee	36689	D	1	0.053		35.729444°N 89.5425°W
WTWB	Auburndale, Florida	74153	D	5	0.013		28.075556°N 81.821944°W
WUBG	Methuen, Massachusetts	22798	D	44	0.14		42.673889°N 71.190556°W
WVOJ	Fernandina Beach, Florida	49214	D	10	0.03		30.675833°N 81.459722°W
WWCK	Flint, Michigan	39679	D	1	0.179		43.010833°N 83.650833°W
WXVE	Latrobe, Pennsylvania	36115	D	1	0.224		40.301944°N 79.365556°W
WYTI	Rocky Mount, Virginia	74280	B	2.5	0.22		36.976944°N 79.895833°W
WYWO	Warren, Ohio	70531	D	0.5	0.116		41.206111°N 80.841389°W
