= WCAZ (disambiguation) =

WCAZ may refer to:

- WCAZ (AM), a radio station (1510 AM) licensed to serve Carthage, Illinois, United States
- WCAZ (990 AM), a defunct radio station (990 AM) formerly licensed to serve Carthage, Illinois, United States
- WQKQ, a Dallas City, Illinois, United States radio station (92.1 FM), which held the call letters WCAZ-FM from 1977 until 1995
