= WZOE =

WZOE may refer to:

- WZOE (AM), a radio station (1490 AM) licensed to Princeton, Illinois, United States
- WZOE-FM, a radio station (98.1 FM) licensed to Princeton, Illinois, United States
