= WLTI =

WLTI may refer to:

- WLTI (AM) (1550) in New Castle, Indiana, which assumed this call sign in 2010
- WKLZ (105.9) in Syracuse, New York, used the call sign from 1996 to 2010
- WUFL (FM) (93.1) in Detroit, Michigan, used the call sign from 1985 to 1996
- WUML (91.5) in Lowell, Massachusetts, used the call sign from 1967 to 1975
