= WMDH =

WMDH can refer to:

- WMDH-FM, a radio station (102.5 FM) licensed to New Castle, Indiana, United States
- WLTI (AM), a radio station (1550 AM) licensed to New Castle, Indiana, which held the call sign WMDH from 1991 to 2010
