= WHNQ =

WHNQ may refer to:

- WHNQ (AM), a radio station (1140 AM) licensed to serve St. Paul, Virginia, United States
- WSWV (AM), a radio station (1570 AM) licensed to serve Pennington Gap, Virginia, which held the call sign WHNQ from 2022 to 2024
