= WSWV =

WSWV may refer to:

- WSWV (AM), a radio station (1570 AM) licensed to serve Pennington Gap, Virginia, United States
- WLGY (FM), a radio station (105.5 FM) licensed to serve Pennington Gap, Virginia, which held the call sign WSWV-FM from 1973 to 2024
