= WFBM =

WFBM may refer to:

- WFBM (FM), a radio station (90.5 FM) licensed to serve Beaver Springs, Pennsylvania, United States
- WNDE, an AM radio station (1260 kHz) licensed to serve Indianapolis, Indiana, United States, which held the call sign WFBM from 1924 to 1973
- WFBQ, an FM radio station (94.7 MHz) licensed to serve Indianapolis, Indiana, which held the call sign WFBM-FM from 1955 to 1973
- WRTV, a television station (channel 6 analog/25 digital) licensed to serve Indianapolis, Indiana, which held the call sign WFBM-TV from 1949 to 1972
- WYIC, an AM radio station (1110 kHz) licensed to serve Noblesville, Indiana, which held the call sign WFBM from 1979 to 1987
- WFBM-LP, a defunct low-power radio station (100.1 MHz) formerly licensed to serve Beaver Springs, Pennsylvania
