= WYEC =

WYEC may refer to:

- WCAZ (AM), a radio station (1510 AM) licensed to serve Macomb, Illinois, United States, which held the call sign WYEC from 2016 to 2018
- KQCJ, a radio station (93.9 FM) licensed to serve Cambridge, Illinois, which held the call sign WYEC from 2003 to 2016
