= Real Country =

Syndicated radio format

- Type: Radio network
- Country: United States

Ownership
- Owner: Westwood One
- Key people: Kris Wilson, Music Director

History
- Launch date: 1988

Coverage
- Availability: National; also distributed in Canada, Europe, Armed Forces Radio

Real Country is a 24-hour radio format produced by Westwood One. Real Country is marketed at the demographic of men aged 35 to 64. Its programming consists of a fairly broad playlist of "Today's Stars and the Legends." Classic country is the station's primary core, with frequent airplay of artists such as George Jones and Johnny Cash, while the station also plays newer hits, particularly by established neotraditional country artists such as George Strait and Alan Jackson. More contemporary artists can be heard on Westwood One's other country format, Best Country Today.

Its direct competitor was "True Country" by Dial Global. "Real Country" was established in 1988 as a partnership between Satellite Music Network and radio station owner and country music legend Buck Owens, with operations based at Owens-owned KCWW (now KQFN) in Tempe, Arizona. SMN and Owens sold the station and network to The Walt Disney Company in 1998, who operated the network as part of the ABC Radio Networks until 2007. The network is currently owned and operated by Cumulus Media.

== Schedule ==
Although stations that program "Real Country" use it for a majority of their programming, affiliates—like most others who use satellite programming—will often replace the network feed at certain points of the day for local programming, most often news, sports and markets (depending on the station).

Up to six minutes are given to affiliates at the top of every hour for news or commercials. In addition, at least one block of one to three minutes is provided for local commercials every ten minutes. After each commercial block and 14 seconds before the top of the hour, time is provided for affiliate station identification.

Hosts currently heard on the network include 24 year Real Country veteran Kris Wilson, Jim Casey and Jacy Shepherd.

=== Former hosts ===
- Darlene Dixon- Hosted middays for a period in the early 1990s, later at WLWI-FM in Montgomery, Alabama.
- Mike Farell- Hosted the overnight show seven days a week until 2007. He referred to himself on the air as "The Friend of the Friendless".
- Steve Lewis- Hosted the evening show Monday-Friday and Real Country Saturday Night until 2009.
- Jerry Walker- Replaced Steve Lewis on the Monday-Friday show until November 12, 2009.
- Richard Lee- Hosted the afternoon show for over a decade and was also program director until November 12, 2009.
- John Calhoun- Morning show host from 2007 until November 12, 2009.
- Sage- Occasional overnight and fill-in DJ, referred to herself on the air as "Sage, your real spice of life".
- Bobby Sherman- worked evenings from 1989-
- Mark Bateman- worked the all-nighter from 1989- 1995 then joined KIIM FM in Tucson till 2005 Then started his own business and got out of radio
- Dick Ellingson- did weekends and filled in from 1989-1993. Hosted the Saturday Night All Request Show.
- Terry Jones- did middays from 1989-
- Bob Jackson- first morning man on the network
- Chris Daniels (Eicher) - Did weekends and vacation fill-in from 1997 - 2001

=== Affiliates ===
This is a partial list.

- Altavista, Virginia - WKDE-FM
- Bandon, Oregon - KBDN
- Batesville, Mississippi - WBLE
- Bartlesville, Oklahoma - KRIG-FM
- Bayboro, North Carolina - WNBB
- Billings, Montana - KRKX
- Blackshear, Georgia - WKUB
- Bolivar, Tennessee - WMOD
- Carthage, Illinois - WCAZ
- Dyersville, Iowa - KDST
- Frostburg, Maryland - WFRB
- Gibsland, Louisiana - KBEF
- Glasgow, Kentucky - WLYE-FM
- Gordon, Nebraska - KSDZ
- Hardinsburg, Indiana - WKLO
- Hays, Kansas - KHAZ
- Henry, Tennessee - WHNY-FM
- Hermiston, Oregon - KOHU
- Kingwood, West Virginia - WKMM
- La Grange, Texas - KBUK/KVLG
- Larned, Kansas - KGBK
- Lebanon, Tennessee - WANT/WCOR
- Leesville, Louisiana - KJAE
- Memphis, Missouri - KMEM-FM
- Monroe, Georgia - WMOQ
- New Castle, Indiana - WLTI
- Paris, Tennessee - WHNY
- Russellville, Alabama - WGOL
- Sparta, Illinois - WHCO
- Washington, Indiana - WWBL
- Wichita, Kansas - KWLS
- Winner, South Dakota - KWYR
- Winona, Minnesota - KHWK
