= WYIC =

- Noblesville, Indiana; United States
- Frequency: 1110 kHz

Ownership
- Owner: Broadcast Communications, Inc.

History
- First air date: November 1, 1971
- Last air date: December 9, 1991
- Former call signs: WHYT (1971–1979); WFBM (1979–1987)

Technical information
- Facility ID: 6898
- Power: 1,000 watts (days only)
- Transmitter coordinates: 40°4′41″N 86°1′4″W

WYIC was a radio station broadcasting on 1110 AM in Noblesville, Indiana, United States. It was last owned by Broadcast Communications, Inc., and operated from 1971 to 1991.

== History ==
=== WHYT ===
On May 20, 1966, White River Radio Corporation applied to the Federal Communications Commission (FCC) to build a new daytime-only station in Noblesville. The application was the third attempt by White River to file for a station in Noblesville; the group, led by Rev. Wendell Hansen, had previously pursued an FM station for the same community, and a previous application in 1962 was affected by an FCC freeze on new construction permits. While this was going on, White River also obtained the license for television channel 40 as WURD, which folded and was sold in 1972 after experiencing financial trouble.

The construction permit for the radio station was granted on November 14, 1969, after White River spun out the Mid-Indiana Broadcasters Corporation. Tower construction took place in August 1970, but efforts were diverted to starting the TV station before WHYT debuted on November 1, 1971. Various music formats were aired in blocks, and several local interest programs were also presented. The station increased power from 250 to 500 watts in 1977.

In 1976, Hansen attempted to sell WHYT to the Family Life Broadcasting System. The non-profit corporation from Michigan, however, experienced pushback in its proposal to convert the station into a non-commercial outlet from WHYT advertisers and a radio station employee, Dee Goff, who conducted a hitchhiking trip from Indiana to Washington, D.C., to protest the deal before Indiana senator Vance Hartke. Goff discovered discrepancies in Family Life's application, namely that community leaders that Family Life had claimed to have contacted were not. Goff's opposition made her the subject of harassment and threats. On January 18, an anonymous caller told her that she had 12 hours to leave town. The next day, two men beat her in her home with a fireplace poker, demanding that she give them the address of WHYT's owner and telling her to stay out of the sale process "or else". The men had gained entry feigning car trouble and claiming they needed to use the telephone. Hansen had previously received a phone call from Warren Bolthouse, the president of Family Life, ordering him to fire Goff or he "would be in deep, deep trouble". Authorities exonerated Family Life of any connection to the beating. After Goff was released from the hospital, she failed a polygraph test. The sale application was dismissed in June 1977, and no indictment was ever returned.

=== WFBM ===
White River filed to sell WHYT to Broadcast Communications, Inc. (BCI) in early 1979. Broadcast Communications was owned by James Mathis and Emmett DePoy. Family Life sued to block the sale until its purchase agreement, on which it claimed Hansen reneged by ultimately refusing to support the transaction, was dealt with in court. It sought $94,000 in damages. Family Life's lawsuit served to announce the sale to the local community.

After the lawsuit was settled in April, BCI took over in June and adopted a set of familiar call letters in Indiana radio, WFBM; Mathis and DePoy had worked at the original WFBM in Indianapolis, staying with WFBM television when it was sold off and renamed WRTV before leaving to purchase the Noblesville station. A new format of adult contemporary and easy listening music was adopted, and the studios were relocated from the transmitter site north of town to a downtown location. The two also expanded in broadcasting by purchasing WNON in nearby Lebanon, Indiana, which was sold off in 1985 to concentrate on an effort to seek a new FM construction permit in Noblesville. In late 1985, WFBM switched on a trial basis to Radio Aahs, a new syndicated format aimed at children.

=== WYIC ===
Mathis died on May 20, 1986. DePoy continued to run the radio station after his business partner's death, with a major overhaul taking place in May 1987 as the station shifted from adult standards to soft adult contemporary. A new call sign, WYIC ("We're Your Indy Connection"), was also adopted. BCI also announced its intent to file for an FM station in Noblesville. By 1988, the station was a full-time affiliate of the Sun Radio Network, a satellite-delivered talk service.

In July 1991, DePoy reached a deal to sell WYIC to K. Stephen Mohr, who had previously owned WMDH-AM-FM in New Castle, for $130,000. DePoy attempted to keep the station on the air until the sale closed, but WYIC left the air permanently on the evening of December 9, 1991, with DePoy noting that income was insufficient to cover the station's operating expenses in spite of local community support.
