= WKAI =

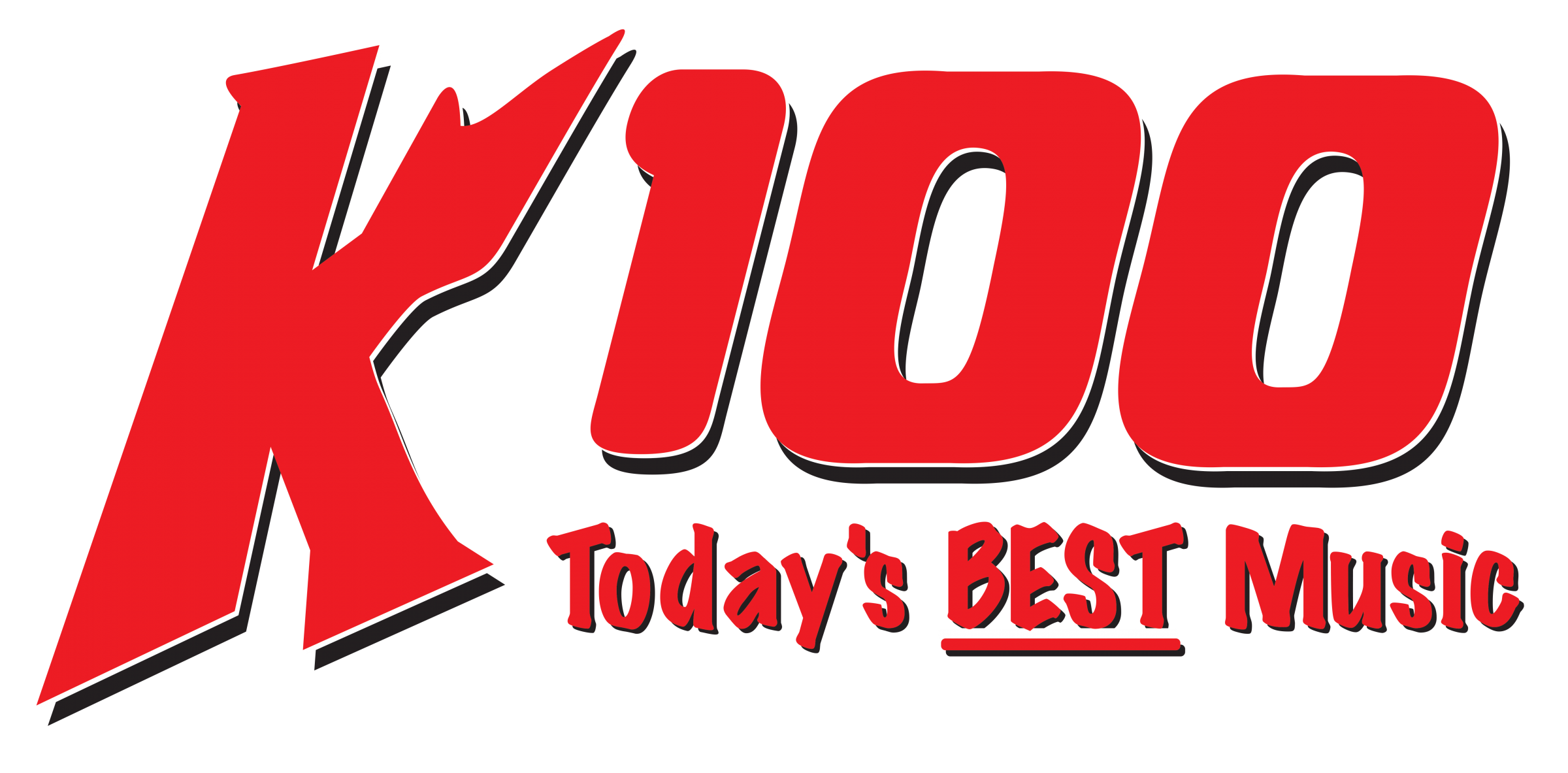
- Macomb, Illinois; United States
- Broadcast area: Western Illinois
- Frequency: 100.1 MHz
- Branding: K 100

Programming
- Format: Contemporary hit radio

Ownership
- Owner: Fletcher Ford; (Virden Broadcasting Corp.)
- Sister stations: WNLF, WJEQ, WMQZ, WLMD

History
- First air date: June 6, 1966
- Former call signs: WKAI-FM (1966–1984)
- Call sign meaning: to match original callsign of WCAZ

Technical information
- Licensing authority: FCC
- Facility ID: 60016
- Class: B1
- ERP: 25,000 watts
- HAAT: 86 meters (282 ft)
- Transmitter coordinates: 40°32′1.0″N 90°51′45.0″W

Links
- Public license information: Public file; LMS
- Website: regionalmedia.live/radio/western-illinois/wkai-fm-k100/

WKAI (100.1 FM) is a 25,000 watt radio station in Macomb, Illinois, in west-central Illinois. WKAI has been on the air since June 6, 1966. It is owned by Fletcher Ford, through licensee Virden Broadcasting Corp.

Survey after survey shows K-100 to be the most popular radio station in McDonough County. K-100 features contemporary hit music of today along with local news, weather, sports and chances to win prizes several times each day. K-100 also carries live play-by-play of Macomb High School football and basketball, and other special sports broadcasts throughout the year.

== History ==
- 15 September 1965 — WKAI Broadcasting Company is granted permission to build a new FM radio station.
- 1966 — WKAI-FM is added to the existing WKAI-AM (now WCAZ) at 1510 kHz and Macomb Daily Journal media properties owned by the Rudolph family.
- 2005 — Construction permit filed with FCC to increase station power to 11.5 kW ERP.
- 2009 — WKAI was transferred from WPW Broadcasting, Inc. in DeKalb, Illinois to Colchester Radio, Inc.
- November 30, 2015 — WKAI was sold to Virden Broadcasting Corp., along with five sister stations, for $725,000.
