= WKDA =

Radio station in Lebanon–Nashville, Tennessee

Lebanon, Tennessee; United States
- Broadcast area: Nashville, Tennessee
- Frequency: 900 kHz C-QUAM AM stereo

Programming
- Format: Big band

Ownership
- Owner: Wilson County Broadcasting, Inc.
- Sister stations: WANT, WCOR

History
- First air date: December 21, 1949 (first license granted)

Technical information
- Licensing authority: FCC
- Facility ID: 71289
- Class: D
- Power: 5,000 watts day; 136 watts night
- Transmitter coordinates: 36°12′24.2″N 86°16′2.0″W
- Translator: (101.9 MHz) W270DM (Lebanon)

Links
- Public license information: Public file; LMS

WKDA (900 AM) is a radio station broadcasting a Big Band format. Licensed to Lebanon, Tennessee, United States, the station serves the Nashville area. The station is owned by Wilson County Broadcasting, Inc.

== History ==
The WKDA callsign was used in Nashville for a long period on the AM frequency of 1240 kHz. In the 1960s, WKDA's on-air staff of disc jockeys was promoted collectively as the "WKDA Good Guys" and it had an on-air rivalry for much of this period with WMAK, for teenage listeners especially. WKDA then maintained studios in the downtown Nashville Stahlman Building; a giant neon sign readily visible across the Cumberland River in East Nashville advertised this fact.

As AM radio declined in popularity with music listeners in the 1970s, WKDA lost listenership, largely to its own FM sister, now WKDF, which then had an Album Rock format. WKDA was later sold to Nashville broadcaster and entrepreneur Teddy Bart, who used it to broadcast his own programming, namely his long-running talk show Roundtable, and to serve as the Nashville affiliate of CNN Radio during other hours. Later in the 1990s, Bart sold the station to owners who changed the format to gospel music and the callsign to WNSG; the heritage WKDA callsign became available for reassignment and was purchased for use by the current station. Its frequency, 900 AM, was the home of Lebanon station WCOR from 1949 to 2005. WCOR now broadcasts on 1490 AM.

== See also ==
- List of Nashville media
