= WXTL =

WXTL may refer to:

- WXTL-LD, a low-power television station (channel 36) licensed to serve Tallahassee, Florida, United States; see List of television stations in Florida
- WKLZ, a radio station (105.9 FM) licensed to serve Syracuse, New York, United States, which held the call sign WXTL from 2010 to 2020
