= WLRB =

WLRB may refer to:

- WLRB (FM), a radio station (102.7 FM) licensed to serve Ocean City, New Jersey, United States
- WJFN-FM, a radio station (100.5 FM) licensed to serve Goochland, Virginia, United States, which held the call sign WLRB from 2017 to 2018
- WCAZ (AM), a radio station (1510 AM) licensed to serve Macomb, Illinois, United States, which held the call sign WLRB from 1984 to 2016
