= WRVY-FM =

Coordinates: 41°4′3.6″N 89°21′13.5″W

- Henry, Illinois; United States
- Frequency: 100.5 MHz
- Branding: Hog Country 100.5

Programming
- Format: Country

Ownership
- Owner: Fletcher Ford; (Virden Broadcasting Corp.)
- Sister stations: WZOE

History
- First air date: July 1990
- Call sign meaning: River Valley

Technical information
- Licensing authority: FCC
- Facility ID: 28292
- Class: A
- ERP: 3,000 watts
- HAAT: 100 meters (330 ft)

Links
- Public license information: Public file; LMS
- Website: illinoisnewsnow.com/princetonnewsnow/

WRVY-FM (100.5 FM) is a radio station licensed to Henry, Illinois, United States. The station airs a country music format, and is currently owned by Fletcher Ford, through licensee Virden Broadcasting Corp.

== History ==
The station went on air in July 1990 and was owned by The 29th Broadcasting Company of Ridgway, Colorado. Local talent operated the station until it abruptly went off the air in October 1991 The station was then purchased by WCIC (an Illinois Bible Institute radio station) as a translator station in June 1992 The station was then purchased by current owner WZOE, a radio station in neighboring Princeton, Illinois.

Previous logo
