= WVSG =

WVSG may refer to:

- WVSG (AM), a radio station (820 AM) licensed to Columbus, Ohio
- WLXB, a radio station (98.9 FM) licensed to Bethel, North Carolina, which held the WVSG call letters in 1990
- WGCK-FM, a radio station (99.7 FM) licensed to Coeburn, Virginia, which held the WVSG call letters from 2002 to 2006
- WNKW, a radio station (1480 AM) licensed to Neon, Kentucky, which held the WVSG call letters from 2006 to 2009
