= WSSQ =

- Sterling, Illinois; United States
- Broadcast area: Rock River Valley
- Frequency: 105.5 MHz
- Branding: Star 105.5

Programming
- Format: Adult contemporary

Ownership
- Owner: Fletcher M. Ford; (Virden Broadcasting Corp.)
- Sister stations: WSDR, WZZT

History
- First air date: October 22, 1966
- Former call signs: WJVM (1966–1988)
- Former frequencies: 94.3 MHz (1966–2018)
- Call sign meaning: Seith Serafin Quality

Technical information
- Licensing authority: FCC
- Facility ID: 37208
- Class: A
- ERP: 6,000 watts
- HAAT: 94 meters (308 ft)
- Transmitter coordinates: 41°51′8.00″N 89°42′35.00″W

Links
- Public license information: Public file; LMS
- Website: illinoisnewsnow.com/saukvalleynow/wssq-fm

WSSQ (105.5 FM, "Star 105.5") is a commercial radio station licensed to Sterling, Illinois, United States, serving primarily Whiteside and Lee counties in the Rock River Valley. Owned by Fletcher M. Ford, through licensee Virden Broadcasting Corp., WSSQ carries an adult contemporary format and serves as the local affiliate for the Chicago Bulls Radio Network. WSSQ also broadcasts Chicago Cubs baseball games.

== History ==
WSSQ launched as WJVM at 94.3 MHz on October 22, 1966; as of 1968, the station was transmitting at 3,000 watts. It was assigned the WSSQ call letters on August 8, 1988. The station was then owned by Seith-Serafin of Sterling, Illiniois, and the station callsign was chosen as an acronym for "Seith Serafin Quality". In July 1993, it was announced that WSSQ and its AM sister station WSDR were sold to LH&S Communications, a company owned by Larry Sales and Howard Murphy which owned radio properties throughout the state of Illinois. In 1998, WSSQ was acquired by Withers Broadcasting.

Effective July 28, 2017, Withers Broadcasting sold WSSQ, WSDR, and WZZT to Fletcher M. Ford's Virden Broadcasting Corp. for $400,000. As of January 24, 2018, WSSQ had a construction permit to change frequency to 105.5 MHz, which took place on June 25, 2018.

== Current programming ==
In addition to its adult contemporary music format, WSSQ is a member of the Chicago Bulls Radio Network; WSSQ is one of the nearest network affiliates for the Quad Cities region.

== Previous logo ==
Logo for old frequency
