= KVVL =

- Maryville, Missouri; United States
- Frequency: 97.1 MHz

Programming
- Format: Classic rock

Ownership
- Owner: Regional Media-Virden Broadcasting; (Regional Media, Inc.)
- Sister stations: KNIM

History
- First air date: September 1972 (as KNIM-FM)
- Former call signs: KNIM-FM (1972–2010)
- Call sign meaning: "Vill" (former format)

Technical information
- Licensing authority: FCC
- Facility ID: 48974
- Class: C3
- ERP: 21,500 watts
- HAAT: 107.9 meters (354 ft)
- Transmitter coordinates: 40°23′31.00″N 94°58′4.00″W

Links
- Public license information: Public file; LMS
- Webcast: Listen Live
- Website: 971kvvl.com

KVVL (97.1 FM) is a radio station in Maryville, Missouri, which airs a classic rock format. It is owned by the Regional Media-Virden Broadcasting.

== History ==
The station began broadcasting in September 1972, holding the call sign KNIM-FM, simulcast the programming of AM 1580 KNIM. It originally broadcast at 95.3 MHz. On August 4, 2010, its call sign was changed to KVVL reflecting its branding as the Ville.

On December 31, 2021, Regional Media acquired the station and its sister station KNIM from Nodaway Broadcasting which had been owned by Jim and Joyce Cronin since 1996. On January 14, 2022, Regional Media flipped the station from classic rock to alternative rock, and rebranded to "Real Alternative Radio". At that time, the station also added the syndicated The Bob & Tom Show in morning drive.

On November 14, 2023, KVVL flipped back to classic rock positioning as "Everything That Rocks".
