= KBUR =

Radio station in Burlington, Iowa

- Burlington, Iowa; United States
- Frequency: 1490 kHz
- Branding: Newsradio 99.3 & 1490

Programming
- Format: News/talk

Ownership
- Owner: Pritchard Broadcasting Corporation (sale to Civic Media pending)
- Sister stations: KBKB; KDMG; KHDK; KKMI; WQKQ

History
- First air date: September 11, 1941
- Call sign meaning: Burlington

Technical information
- Licensing authority: FCC
- Facility ID: 39268
- Class: C
- Power: 760 watts unlimited
- Transmitter coordinates: 40°49′26″N 91°08′33″W
- Translator: 99.3 K257GC (Burlington)

Links
- Public license information: Public file; LMS
- Website: www.kbur.com

KBUR (1490 AM) is a radio station in Burlington, Iowa, United States. The station broadcasts a news/talk format and is owned by Pritchard Broadcasting Corporation.

Pritchard Broadcasting Corporation, owned by John T. Pritchard, agreed to purchase the station from GAP West Broadcasting (owned by Skip Weller) in late 2007. The station had previously been owned by Clear Channel Communications.

In October 2026, it was announced that Pritchard Broadcasting Corporation, along with two other radio broadcasting companies would sell their radio stations to Civic Media.

Logo before translator sign on
