= KHDK =

Radio station in New London, Iowa

- New London, Iowa; United States
- Broadcast area: Burlington
- Frequency: 97.3 MHz
- Branding: Hot 97.3

Programming
- Format: Top 40 (CHR)

Ownership
- Owner: Pritchard Broadcasting Corporation (sale to Civic Media pending)
- Sister stations: KBKB; KBUR; KDMG; KKMI; WQKQ

History
- First air date: October 5, 2001
- Former call signs: KKNL (2001–2006)
- Call sign meaning: K Hot 97 Dot 3 K

Technical information
- Licensing authority: FCC
- Facility ID: 89613
- Class: A
- ERP: 3,800 watts
- HAAT: 125 meters (410 ft)
- Transmitter coordinates: 40°47′53″N 91°26′22″W

Links
- Public license information: Public file; LMS
- Website: www.hot973online.com

KHDK (97.3 FM "Hot 97.3") is a Top 40 (CHR) radio station licensed to New London, Iowa, United States, serving the Burlington area. It is owned by the Pritchard Broadcasting Corporation.

== Before KHDK ==
Formats of KHDK
Name (call signs)	Format
KKMI (simulcast) (KKNL)	Adult contemporary (2001–2005)
HOT 97.3	Contemporary hit radio (2005–present)

Before CHR made its 2006 debut in the Burlington–Fort Madison area on 97.3, the station was known as KKNL (K K New London). KKNL was actually a simulcast of 93.5 KKMI to provide a better signal to Mount Pleasant, as the 93.5 signal is hard to receive in the Mount Pleasant area. The simulcast lasted for four years, until late-2005 when KKNL broke away from KKMI, emerging as the Tri-States New Hit Music Channel: Hot 97.3.

== Syndicated shows ==
Hot 97.3 syndicates numerous radio shows. "The Kidd Kraddick Morning Show" is the stations flagship syndicated show. On the weekends they also syndicate "Rick Dees Weekly Top 40", "Hollywood Hamilton Weekend Top 30", and "The Hollywood 5".

== On-air staff ==
The station airs The Kidd Kraddick Morning show weekday mornings followed by Hayden Roberts (10a-3p), Kara (3pm-7pm), and XYZ with Erik Zachary (7pm-mid)
