= WNBB =

- Bayboro, North Carolina; United States
- Broadcast area: Greenville-New Bern
- Frequency: 97.9 MHz
- Branding: 97.9 The Bear

Programming
- Format: Country
- Affiliations: Real Country (Westwood One)

Ownership
- Owner: Coastal Carolina Radio

History
- First air date: 2001 (as WRUP)
- Former call signs: WBHU (1998–2000, CP); WRUP (2000–2003)
- Call sign meaning: W N Bear B

Technical information
- Licensing authority: FCC
- Facility ID: 87566
- Class: C2
- ERP: 50,000 watts
- HAAT: 132 meters
- Transmitter coordinates: 35°00′02″N 76°49′58″W

Links
- Public license information: Public file; LMS
- Webcast: Listen live
- Website: 979bearradio.com

WNBB (97.9 FM) is a radio station airing a gold based country music format. Licensed to Bayboro, North Carolina, United States, it serves the Greenville-New Bern area. The station is currently owned by Coastal Carolina Radio.

== History ==
The station went on the air as WBHU on 1998-09-18. on 2000-11-06, the station changed its call sign to WRUP, on 2003-11-21 to the current WNBB.

From 2004 to 2015 the station was simulcast on WNBR-FM.
