= KBKB (AM) =

Radio station in Fort Madison, Iowa

- Fort Madison, Iowa; United States
- Broadcast area: Burlington–Keokuk
- Frequency: 1360 kHz
- Branding: Fox Sports 104.5 FM & 1360 AM

Programming
- Format: Sports
- Affiliations: Fox Sports Radio; Burlington Bees

Ownership
- Owner: Pritchard Broadcasting Corporation (sale to Civic Media pending)
- Sister stations: KBUR; KDMG; KHDK; KKMI; WQKQ

History
- First air date: January 10, 1949

Technical information
- Licensing authority: FCC
- Facility ID: 64567
- Class: D
- Power: 1,000 watts day; 34 watts night
- Transmitter coordinates: 40°39′30″N 91°16′20″W
- Translator: 104.5 K283CK (Fort Madison)

Links
- Public license information: Public file; LMS
- Website: www.1360kbkb.com

KBKB (1360 kHz) is an AM radio station licensed to Fort Madison, Iowa, United States, serving the communities of Burlington and Keokuk, Iowa. Owned by Pritchard Broadcasting Corporation, the station primarily broadcasts a sports format, airing programming from Fox Sports Radio, including Colin Cowherd and JT The Brick.

Pritchard Broadcasting Corporation (owned by John T. Pritchard) agreed to purchase the station from GAP West (owned by Skip Weller) in late 2007. The station was owned by Clear Channel prior to GAP West.

In October 2026, it was announced that Pritchard Broadcasting Corporation, along with two other radio broadcasting companies would sell their radio stations to Civic Media.
