= WNLF =

- Macomb, Illinois; United States
- Broadcast area: Western Illinois
- Frequency: 95.9 MHz
- Branding: Hog Country 95.9

Programming
- Format: Country

Ownership
- Owner: Fletcher Ford; (Virden Broadcasting Corp.)
- Sister stations: WKAI, WJEQ, WMQZ, WLMD

History
- First air date: 2001
- Call sign meaning: Nancy L. Foster (Previous Owner)

Technical information
- Licensing authority: FCC
- Facility ID: 84197
- Class: A
- ERP: 6,000 watts
- HAAT: 100 meters (330 ft)
- Transmitter coordinates: 40°25′3.0″N 90°36′51.0″W (NAD83)

Links
- Public license information: Public file; LMS
- Website: regionalmedia.live

WNLF (95.9 FM) is a commercial radio station in Macomb, Illinois. WNLF airs a country music format branded as "Hog Country 95.9".

Formerly part of the husband-and-wife Prestige Communications radio group, WNLF obtained its license on March 16, 2001, and had been owned by Nancy L. Foster via Colchester Radio, Inc. since its inception. Effective November 30, 2015, WNLF and five sister stations were sold to Fletcher Ford's Virden Broadcasting Corp. at a purchase price of $725,000.

Previous logo

On August 26, 2015, WNLF changed their format from modern rock to country, branded as "Backroad Country 95.9".
