= KDMG =

Radio station in Burlington, Iowa

- Burlington, Iowa; United States
- Frequency: 103.1 MHz
- Branding: Big Country 103.1

Programming
- Format: Country
- Affiliations: Compass Media Networks; Performance Racing Network; Premiere Networks; United Stations Radio Networks; Westwood One

Ownership
- Owner: Pritchard Broadcasting Corporation (sale to Civic Media pending)
- Sister stations: KBKB; KBUR; KHDK; KKMI; WQKQ

History
- First air date: July 19, 1993

Technical information
- Licensing authority: FCC
- Facility ID: 53603
- Class: C3
- ERP: 12,000 watts
- HAAT: 145 meters (476 ft)
- Transmitter coordinates: 40°44′04″N 91°15′15″W

Links
- Public license information: Public file; LMS
- Website: www.bigcountry1031.com

KDMG (103.1 FM "Big Country 103.1") is a commercial radio station in Burlington, Iowa, United States. Owned by Pritchard Broadcasting Corporation, the station broadcasts a country music format.

== On-air personalities ==
"The David Kroll Radio Show" hosted by David Kroll is on weekday mornings 6–10. Gail Austin hosts Monday-Friday from 10 am – 3 pm, while Aric Bremer hosts afternoons Monday–Friday from 3 to 7 and Saturday 10 am – 3 pm. Kara hosts middays on Sunday from 10 am to 3 pm. KDMG previously carried Southeastern Community College men's basketball, which has the most wins in junior college basketball history, but the SCC broadcasts were moved to sister KHDK beginning with the 2013–2014 season.

== Syndicated programming ==
Big Country syndicates numerous shows. The Lia Show, Z-MAX Racing Country, Lon Helton's Country Countdown USA, New Music Nashville, and Rick Jackson's Country Classics.
