= Regional Media-Virden Broadcasting =

Regional Media-Virden Broadcasting headquartered in Davenport, Iowa is private owner of radio stations in the Midwest.

The company traces it founding to Randal J. Miller who at the age of 16 in 1971 started a 100 milliwatt transmitter station with a 300-foot range from his parents house in rural Shelbyville, Illinois. In 1982 he launched 3,000 watt easy listening music station WRVI with a range of 25 miles in Virden, Illinois. He sold the station in 1992 and acquired other small market stations in Illinois and sold the then Taylorville, Illinois based Virden Broadcasting to Fletcher M. Ford in 2013 who moved the headquarters to Davenport. Ford of Blue Grass, Iowa at the time was sales manager of Virden's Kewanee radio stations.

The Virden name frequently has been clipped to just Regional Media since Ford's acquisition. In December 2021, the company expanded outside of Illinois radio station base with the acquisition of KVVL and KNIM in Maryville, Missouri. The company's web reginonalmedia.info

== Prestige Communications ==
Prestige Communications was a broadcast radio station group in Macomb, Illinois. It operated six stations in west-central Illinois owned by the husband-wife team of Bruce T. Foster and Nancy L. Foster. All six stations were sold to Virden Broadcasting Corp. effective November 30, 2015, at a purchase price of $725,000. The stations, with ownership as of 2009, were:

- Central Illinois Broadcasting Company — 74% Bruce Foster; 26% Nancy Foster shares voted by Bruce Foster
  - 102.7 WJEQ Macomb, Illinois — from bankrupt McDonough Broadcasting, Inc. on 14 June 1989
- Colchester Radio, Inc. — 100% owned by Nancy Foster
  - 1510 WLRB Macomb, Illinois — from WPW Broadcasting on 6 January 2009
  - 100.1 WKAI Macomb, Illinois — from WPW Broadcasting on 6 January 2009
  - 104.1 WMQZ Colchester, Illinois — licensed as new on 9 June 1999
  - 104.7 WLMD Bushnell, Illinois — from WPW Broadcasting on 6 January 2009
- Nancy L. Foster — as sole proprietor
  - 95.9 WNLF Macomb, Illinois — FCC construction permit granted by Auction #25, MX FM 51, in 1996; licensed as new 16 March 2001

== Stations ==
=== Illinois ===
- KQCJ FM, Cambridge, Illinois
- WKEI AM, Kewanee, Illinois
- WJRE FM, Galva, Illinois
- WZOE-FM, Princeton, Illinois
- WZOE (AM), Princeton, Illinois
- WRVY FM, Henry, Illinois
- WZZT FM, Morrison, Illinois
- WSSQ FM, Sterling, Illinois
- WSDR AM, Sterling, Illinois
- WLMD (FM), Bushnell, Illinois
- WJEQ FM, Macomb, Illinois
- WKAI FM, Macomb, Illinois
- WNLF FM, Macomb, Illinois
- WMQZ FM, Colchester, Illinois

=== Missouri ===
- KVVL FM, Maryville
- KNIM AM, Maryville
