= WZZT =

- Morrison, Illinois; United States
- Broadcast area: Rock River Valley
- Frequency: 102.7 MHz
- Branding: Hog Country 102.7

Programming
- Format: Country

Ownership
- Owner: Fletcher M. Ford; (Virden Broadcasting Corp.)
- Sister stations: WSDR, WSSQ

History
- First air date: April 10, 1991
- Former frequencies: 95.1 MHz (1991–1999)

Technical information
- Licensing authority: FCC
- Facility ID: 37209
- Class: A
- ERP: 6,000 watts
- HAAT: 100 meters (330 ft)
- Transmitter coordinates: 41°50′16.00″N 89°55′29.00″W

Links
- Public license information: Public file; LMS
- Website: hogcountryradio.com

WZZT (102.7 FM, "Hog Country 102.7") is a commercial radio station licensed to Morrison, Illinois, serving primarily Whiteside and Lee counties in the Rock River Valley. Owned by Fletcher M. Ford, through licensee Virden Broadcasting Corp., the station airs a country music format.

== History ==
WZZT launched on April 10, 1991. As of 1992, the station aired an adult contemporary format and was owned by Whiteside Communications, Inc., The station was then transmitting at 3,000 watts. In July 1993, it was announced that WZZT and its sister stations WSDR and WSSQ were to be sold to LH&S Communications, a company owned by Larry Sales and Howard Murphy which owned radio properties throughout the state of Illinois. This group changed the format to album oriented rock. In 1998, WZZT was acquired by Withers Broadcasting. who changed the format to classic rock as "95.1, The Z". In 1999, WZZT switched frequencies to 102.7 and became "102.7, The Z". During the late 2000s and early 2010s, WZZT aired coverage of local high school football, including a 2011 playoff run by Newman Central Catholic. As of 2011, WZZT was airing a rock music format which also included classic hits.

On July 5, 2017, WZZT changed their format from classic rock to country, branded as "Big Country 102.7". Effective July 28, 2017, Withers Broadcasting sold WZZT, WSDR, and WSSQ to Fletcher M. Ford's Virden Broadcasting Corp. for $400,000. In late 2023, WZZT changed its branding to "Hog Country 102.7".

== Previous Logos ==
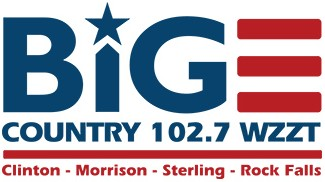
