= WLMD (FM) =

Coordinates: 40.5458735°N 90.4876284°W

- Bushnell, Illinois; United States
- Broadcast area: Macomb, Illinois
- Frequency: 104.7 MHz
- Branding: RegionalMediaNews.com WLMD

Programming
- Format: News/Talk
- Affiliations: Fox News, Fox Sports

Ownership
- Owner: Fletcher Ford; (Virden Broadcasting Corp.)
- Sister stations: WNLF, WKAI, WJEQ, WMQZ

History
- First air date: 1992

Technical information
- Licensing authority: FCC
- Facility ID: 36613
- Class: A
- ERP: 3,300 watts
- HAAT: 115 meters (377 ft)

Links
- Public license information: Public file; LMS
- Webcast: Listen Live
- Website: regionalmedia.live

WLMD (104.7 MHz) is an FM radio station broadcasting a news/talk format. Licensed to Bushnell, Illinois, United States, the station serves the Macomb, Illinois area. WLMD is currently owned by Fletcher Ford, through licensee Virden Broadcasting Corp.

Former logo

On August 26, 2015, WLMD changed their format from country to news/talk, branded as "Macomb News Now 104.7".
