= KDST =

Iowa radio station

- Dyersville, Iowa; United States
- Frequency: 99.3 (MHz)
- Branding: "Real Country 99.3 KDST"

Programming
- Format: Country
- Affiliations: Real Country (Cumulus Media)

Ownership
- Owner: Design Homes, Inc.

History
- First air date: March 21, 1984
- Former call signs: KDMC (1984–1987); KXIX (1987–1988)

Technical information
- Licensing authority: FCC
- Facility ID: 16778
- Class: A
- ERP: 3,000 watts
- HAAT: 91 m (299 ft)
- Transmitter coordinates: 42°25′43″N 91°12′50″W

Links
- Public license information: Public file; LMS
- Webcast: KDST Webstream
- Website: KDST Online

KDST is a country formatted broadcast radio station licensed to Dyersville, Iowa, serving Dubuque and Delaware counties in Iowa. KDST is owned and operated by Design Homes, Inc.

== History ==
The station was licensed as KDMC on March 21, 1984, changed to KXIX August 10, 1987 and changed again to the current KDST on December 15, 1988.

== Transmission ==
The transmitter and broadcast tower are located six miles southwest of Dyersville, near the intersection of 250th Street and 300th Avenue, in rural Hopkinton in Delaware County. According to the Antenna Structure Registration database, the tower is 119 m (390 ft) tall with the FM broadcast antenna mounted at the 115 m (377 ft) level. The calculated Height Above Average Terrain is 91 m (299 ft).
