= WJEQ =

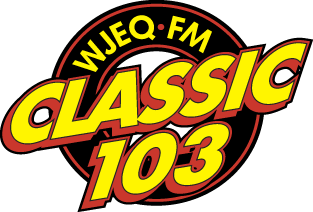
- Macomb, Illinois; United States
- Broadcast area: Western Illinois
- Frequency: 102.7 MHz
- Branding: Classic 103

Programming
- Format: Classic rock

Ownership
- Owner: Fletcher Ford; (Virden Broadcasting Corp.)
- Sister stations: WNLF, WKAI, WMQZ, WLMD

History
- First air date: 1983

Technical information
- Licensing authority: FCC
- Facility ID: 9896
- Class: B1
- ERP: 10,000 watts
- HAAT: 156 meters (512 ft)
- Transmitter coordinates: 40°25′03.0″N 90°36′51.0″W

Links
- Public license information: Public file; LMS

WJEQ (102.7 FM, "Classic 103") is a radio station broadcasting a classic rock format. The format includes the greatest songs from the late 70s, 80s, and into the 90s. Licensed to Macomb, Illinois, United States, the station is currently owned by Fletcher Ford, through licensee Virden Broadcasting Corp.
