= WSDR =

- Sterling, Illinois; United States
- Broadcast area: Rock River Valley
- Frequency: 1240 kHz

Programming
- Language: English
- Format: News/Talk, Adult Contemporary

Ownership
- Owner: Fletcher M. Ford; (Virden Broadcasting Corp.)
- Sister stations: WSSQ, WZZT

History
- First air date: 1949

Technical information
- Facility ID: 37207
- Class: C
- Power: 500 watts day 1,000 watts night
- Transmitter coordinates: 41°48′59″N 89°40′13″W
- Translator: 93.1 W226CL (Sterling)

Links
- Webcast: Listen Live
- Website: regionalmedia.info/stations/1240-am-wsdr

WSDR (1240 AM) is an American radio station licensed to serve the community of Sterling, Illinois. The station is owned by Fletcher M. Ford and the broadcast license is held by Virden Broadcasting Corp. WSDR is also rebroadcast on translator station W226CL at 93.1 FM.

WSDR airs a news/talk radio format to the Rock River Valley.

The station, established in 1949, was assigned the call sign "WSDR" by the Federal Communications Commission (FCC).

Former logo
