= KNIM =

- Maryville, Missouri; United States
- Frequency: 1580 kHz
- Branding: KNIM Country 95.9-1580

Programming
- Format: Country

Ownership
- Owner: Regional Media-Virden Broadcasting; (Regional Media, Inc.)
- Sister stations: KVVL

History
- First air date: 1953
- Call sign meaning: Kansas, Nebraska, Iowa, Missouri

Technical information
- Licensing authority: FCC
- Facility ID: 48973
- Class: D
- Power: 480 watts day 10 watts night
- Transmitter coordinates: 40°23′31.00″N 94°58′4.90″W
- Translator: 95.9 K240DY (Maryville)

Links
- Public license information: Public file; LMS
- Webcast: Listen Live
- Website: nodawaybroadcasting.com

KNIM (1580 AM) is radio station licensed to Maryville, Missouri. It airs a country music format

== History ==
KNIM began broadcasting in 1953 and was owned by the Maryville Radio and Television Corporation. It originally ran 250 watts, during daytime hours only. In September 1972, its sister station KNIM-FM began broadcasting, simulcasting the programming of KNIM.

On January 1, 2022, Regional Media acquired the station and its sister station KVVL from Nodaway Broadcasting which had been owned by Jim and Joyce Cronin since 1996.

On January 10, 2022, KNIM rebranded as "I'm Country KNIM".

== Translator ==
KNIM is also heard at 95.9 MHz, through a translator in Maryville, Missouri.

Broadcast translator for KNIM
Call sign	Frequency	City of license	FID	ERP (W)	HAAT	Class	FCC info
K240DY	95.9 FM	Maryville, Missouri	154747	250	87.9 m (288 ft)	D	LMS
