= WMQZ =

- Colchester, Illinois; United States
- Broadcast area: Macomb and vicinity
- Frequency: 104.1 MHz
- Branding: Icon 104.1

Programming
- Format: Classic hip hop

Ownership
- Owner: Fletcher Ford; (Virden Broadcasting Corp.)
- Sister stations: WNLF, WKAI, WJEQ, WLMD

History
- First air date: 1999

Technical information
- Licensing authority: FCC
- Facility ID: 78977
- Class: A
- ERP: 6,000 watts
- HAAT: 100 meters (330 ft)
- Transmitter coordinates: 40°31′01.00″N 90°51′45.00″W

Links
- Public license information: Public file; LMS
- Website: WMQZ Online

WMQZ (104.1 FM) is a radio station broadcasting a classic hip hop format. Licensed to Colchester, Illinois, United States, the station serves Macomb, and vicinity. The station is currently owned by Fletcher Ford, through licensee Virden Broadcasting Corp.

== History ==
On October 31, 2019, WMQZ dropped its oldies format as Rewind 104.1 and flipped to active rock as Woof Rock 104.

On May 6, 2024, WMQZ changed their format from active rock to classic hip hop, branded as Icon 104.1.

== Previous logo ==
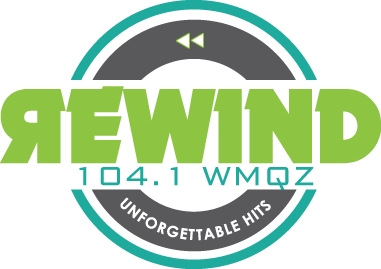
