= KKMI =

Radio station in Burlington, Iowa

- Burlington, Iowa; United States
- Frequency: 93.5 MHz
- Branding: 93.5 KKMI

Programming
- Format: Adult contemporary
- Affiliations: Compass Media Networks; Premiere Networks

Ownership
- Owner: Pritchard Broadcasting Corporation (sale to Civic Media pending)
- Sister stations: KBUR; KBKB; KDMG; KHDK; WQKQ

History
- First air date: October 22, 1981
- Former call signs: KDWD (1981–1991)

Technical information
- Licensing authority: FCC
- Facility ID: 53604
- Class: A
- ERP: 6,000 watts
- HAAT: 93 meters (305 ft)
- Transmitter coordinates: 40°49′11″N 91°07′02″W

Links
- Public license information: Public file; LMS
- Website: www.935kkmi.com

KKMI (93.5 FM) is a commercial radio station in Burlington, Iowa, United States. The station is owned by Pritchard Broadcasting Corporation.

KKMI broadcasts an adult contemporary music format to the greater Burlington area.
