= WQKQ =

Radio station in Dallas City, Illinois

- Dallas City, Illinois; United States
- Broadcast area: Burlington, Iowa
- Frequency: 92.1 MHz
- Branding: KQ92

Programming
- Format: Classic rock
- Affiliations: Westwood One

Ownership
- Owner: Pritchard Broadcasting Corporation (sale to Civic Media pending)
- Sister stations: KBKB; KBUR; KDMG; KHDK; KKMI

History
- First air date: November 1, 1978
- Former call signs: WCAZ-FM (1977–1995); WZBN (1995–1997); WNKK (1997–2000)
- Call sign meaning: "KQ"

Technical information
- Licensing authority: FCC
- Facility ID: 7635
- Class: B1
- ERP: 25,000 watts
- HAAT: 100 meters (330 feet)
- Transmitter coordinates: 40°35′37″N 91°06′48″W

Links
- Public license information: Public file; LMS
- Website: www.kq92rocks.com

WQKQ (92.1 FM, "KQ92") is a commercial radio station licensed to Dallas City, Illinois, United States, serving the Burlington, Iowa area. The station is owned by the Pritchard Broadcasting Corporation.

It broadcasts a classic rock format from studios located in Burlington, Iowa. WQKQ is The Bob & Tom Show affiliate for the Burlington-Fort Madison Area.

== History ==
The station was first licensed in 1978 as WCAZ-FM in Carthage, Illinois, a sister station to WCAZ (990 AM). The station was subsequently assigned, by the Federal Communications Commission, the call letters WZBN in 1995, WNKK in 1997, and WQKQ on April 11, 2000.
