= WANT =

Radio station in Lebanon, Tennessee

- Lebanon, Tennessee; United States
- Broadcast area: Nashville area
- Frequencies: 98.9 MHz; 1490 kHz (WCOR)
- Branding: Real Country FM 98.9

Programming
- Format: Full-service (Primarily country music, but also featuring specialty programs)
- Affiliations: Real Country; Tennessee Titans Radio Network

Ownership
- Owner: Bay Pointe Broadcasting
- Sister stations: WCOR, WKDA

History
- First air date: October 1, 1993; 32 years ago
- Former call signs: WJFM (1992–1993)
- Call sign meaning: You'll WANT to listen! (original slogan)

Technical information
- Licensing authority: FCC
- Facility ID: 4103
- Class: A
- ERP: 5,000 watts
- HAAT: 97 meters (318 ft)
- Transmitter coordinates: 36°12′24.00″N 86°16′2.00″W
- Repeater: (101.9 MHz) W270DM (Lebanon)

Links
- Public license information: Public file; LMS
- Website: wantfm.com

WANT (98.9 FM) is a radio station licensed to Lebanon, Tennessee, broadcasting at 98.9 MHz. Most of WANT's broadcast day is simulcast over 1490 AM WCOR, with some exceptions.

== Programming ==
WANT is primarily focused on serving its community of Lebanon and Wilson County. It can be classified as a full-service radio station, mostly featuring country music, but regularly scheduling programs featuring oldies music, funk music, talk shows, and sporting events. Local news, weather, obituaries, and traffic reports regularly appear on weekdays.

Local deejays anchor morning and afternoon drive times with shows that feature country music, trivia, news, weather, and traffic reports. In addition, a long-running local talk show (Coleman & Company) takes one hour of programming each weekday morning (7am to 8am). The show features interviews with local newsmakers and promotes community events. On Saturday nights, the station plays funk & classic R&B music, hosted by "Fantastic Fred Anthony", a longtime fixture of the station. Sunday nights now feature an oldies music show. In addition to Lebanon High School football and basketball, the station is an affiliate of the Tennessee Titans radio network. WANT also broadcasts selected intercollegiate sporting events featuring teams associated with Lebanon's Cumberland University.

At times when no local programming is offered (such as middays, overnights, and weekends), the station takes programming from the "Real Country" radio network. When the station is playing country music (whether locally originated or from the "Real Country" network), it carries the "Real Country FM 98.9" branding. During other programming blocks, it is simply branded as "FM 98.9 WANT". The WCOR simulcast is seldom acknowledged, except in the station's legal identifications.

== History ==
After operating under a construction permit as WJFM, the station's owners petitioned the FCC to change the call letters to WANT (reflecting the original slogan, "You'll WANT to listen!"). The station first signed on the air on October 1, 1993, and the same day, revived sister station WCOR (then on 900 AM) as a simulcast, after it had been off-the-air for over a year. The station was originally branded as "FM 99", and was later tweaked to "FM 98.9" to represent the station's actual frequency.
