= KJAE =

- Leesville, Louisiana; United States
- Frequency: 93.5 MHz

Programming
- Format: Country
- Affiliations: Fox News Radio

Ownership
- Owner: Pene Broadcasting Company INC
- Sister stations: KLLA

Technical information
- Licensing authority: FCC
- Facility ID: 52140
- Class: C3
- ERP: 7,500 watts
- HAAT: 100 meters
- Transmitter coordinates: 31°8′28″N 93°17′41″W

Links
- Public license information: Public file; LMS
- Website: kjae935.com

KJAE (93.5 FM) is a radio station broadcasting a country music format. Licensed to Leesville, Louisiana, United States, the station serves Vernon Parish and surrounding areas from a studio located in Leesville, Louisiana. The station is currently owned by Pene Broadcasting Company, Inc .

The station broadcasts occasionally using the syndicated Westwood One Real Country format during non-locally produced times. It is also broadcasts syndicated LSU sports over the air. The station is an affiliate of the New Orleans Saints radio network.

== History ==
In late 1975, ownership of KLLA, a 1000 watt AM commercial broadcasting station in Leesville, La., was passed from the station's original builder & owner, Irving Ward Steinman of Alexandria, La. to Pene Broadcasting Co. of Leesville, La. The company was headed by the station's new general manager, Nick J. Pollacia, Jr. (The name "Pene" was chosen because it was the name of Nick Pollacia, Jr's sister) Pene Broadcasting is a family owned organization, and at the time of KLLA's purchase, plans were also being simultaneously made to build a completely new FM radio station for the Leesville, and Vernon Parish broadcasting area. That station was to become KJAE.

In early 1980 the station was granted an FCC permit to begin construction of a Class 'A' FM station with a licensed power originally of 3,000 watts broadcasting at 92.7 on the FM dial. Later in the 1980s KJAE's frequency would be changed by the FCC to 93.5.

Planning for the new FM station had been handled out of the original broadcast facilities of KJAE's older sister station KLLA. However that original station's location was deemed too small to support the new studio and control facilities necessary for both KLLA and KJAE, so a new physical plant building was constructed. This building was separate but also located at the same site as the older building. The original station building still stands today, and is used as a storage facility.

The new facility was much larger building and more than doubled the original space of the older station. It was one that could more comfortably contain both of the two stations broadcast & production studios, and transmitter & equipment control rooms, as well as offices for management, sales and engineering.(two stations operated separately in one building) Anticipatory construction on the facilities had begun in late 1979, and so, final construction on the FM portion was completed in late summer of 1980.

Actual first broadcast operations for KJAE began in the fall of 1980 with the grant of the first FCC license to broadcast. The original KLLA had operated for years with a basically split format that was basically country music in the morning at sign on, and then rock & popular music from noon to sign off, with Christian programming on Sunday mornings. However KJAE had always been meant to be programmed entirely as a country station from sign on to sign off. So when KJAE signed on the air in early 1980, KLLA became a rock music station all day from sign on to sign off. Thus the two stations served the two dominant mainstream forms of music for Leesville & Vernon Parish. Very popular morning and afternoon shows were created, as well as frequent mobile onsite remote broadcasts that are popular to this day. Pollacia inaugurated the very well received and popular seasonal broadcasts of the football games of the Leesville High School Wampus Cats, whether they were home games or away, they were also broadcast by remote.

In the mid 70's, just prior to the dawn of live syndicated broadcasting via satellite link, a new form of syndicated all-day programming had been introduced. With this automated format it was possible for two stations operating out of one building to more or less be handled by one staff member. This System operated by using an early form of computerized automation system to control four large 10.5" 2-track open reel to reel tape decks, two commercial holding rotating carousels for carts, a voice tape/music tape synchronizer and an early computer system to control the entire system. The hardware system itself was marketed by SMC, or the Sono-Mag Corporation. But it needed the separate all important programming itself, and this was the Top American Country programming created for these automation systems by Century 21 Productions of Dallas, Tx.

Each week a large box arrived via priority mail at the station that contained new 10.5 inch large reel tapes. Two would have the new current & upcoming hits on them in different combinations of two together, and another two reels would have a "Recurrent" reel that was music that had just fallen off the charts recently, and an oldie tape and then the all-important voice track tapes. It was all very organized to program an entire week, 24 hours a day. A 7-day printed set of pages showed exactly where each song on the different decks would be rotated onto the air. Voice tapes ran just like live DJs, and they used these same schedules to record their voice tracks. One 'DJ' would come on for four hours for each section of the day starting at 0600 each day. Century 21 used some of the biggest names in country music radio DJs from across the country to record these tapes. The automated synchronizer and the SMC system carried out a good deal of the days programming, while KLLA itself remained live with separate DJs for its broadcast day.

Immediately after going on the air at 0600, KJAE went live for three hours until 0900, and it was the first morning radio show in Vernon Parish that was done live. It had been started on KLLA by owner/manager Nick Pollacia, and when KJAE came on line it transferred over to that new station. The incredibly popular program "Swap Shop" was also created by Mr. Pollacia on KLLA airing at 0900 in the morning, and after transferring to KJAE, has continued non-stop to this day. It remains a regular favorite with listeners.

The automated programming on KJAE was only done until around 1983 or so. Then it was done live for some years until the readily available live satellite programming was used to fill the parts of the night & day when the station was not actually live. Many segments of the day are currently done live.

Mr. Pollacia left the station in the mid 80's to pursue other opportunities. The day-to-day operation and the station's management was passed into the capable hands of his sister, Mrs. Pene Scoggins. She remains the station's longest active employee/owner, having had a strong influence in the day-to-day operations of both stations since their ownership began in 1975.

On January 20, 2000, the station upgraded to its current facilities of 7,500 watts (however, the station jokes about upgrading to 500,000 watts on its website).
