= WTWB =

- Auburndale, Florida; United States
- Broadcast area: Central Florida - Lakeland - Winter Haven
- Frequency: 1570 kHz
- Branding: La Raza 92.7FM 95.5FM & 1570AM

Programming
- Format: Regional Mexican

Ownership
- Owner: Carpenter's Home Church, Inc.

History
- First air date: October 10, 1956

Technical information
- Licensing authority: FCC
- Facility ID: 74153
- Class: D
- Power: 5,000 watts day 13 watts night
- Transmitter coordinates: 28°4′32.00″N 81°49′19.00″W
- Translators: 92.7 W224CF (Auburndale); 95.5 W238CV (Auburndale)

Links
- Public license information: Public file; LMS
- Webcast: WTWB Listen Online
- Website: www.laraza1570.com

WTWB (1570 AM) is a radio station broadcasting a Regional Mexican radio format. Licensed to Auburndale, Florida, the station serves the Lakeland-Winter Haven section of Central Florida. The station is currently owned by Carpenter's Home Church, Inc.

By day, WTWB is powered at 5,000 watts. But 1570 AM is a Mexican clear-channel frequency in which XERF is the dominant Class A station. So to avoid interference, WTWB greatly reduces power at night to 13 watts. Programming is also heard on two FM translator stations: W224CF at 92.7 MHz and W238CV at 95.5 MHz, both in Auburndale.

== History ==
On October 10, 1956, the station first signed on the air. At first it was a daytimer, required to go off the air at night. For a while, it was a network affiliate of the ABC Entertainment Radio Network.

Logo before 95.5 translator sign on
