= KBUK =

Radio station in La Grange, Texas

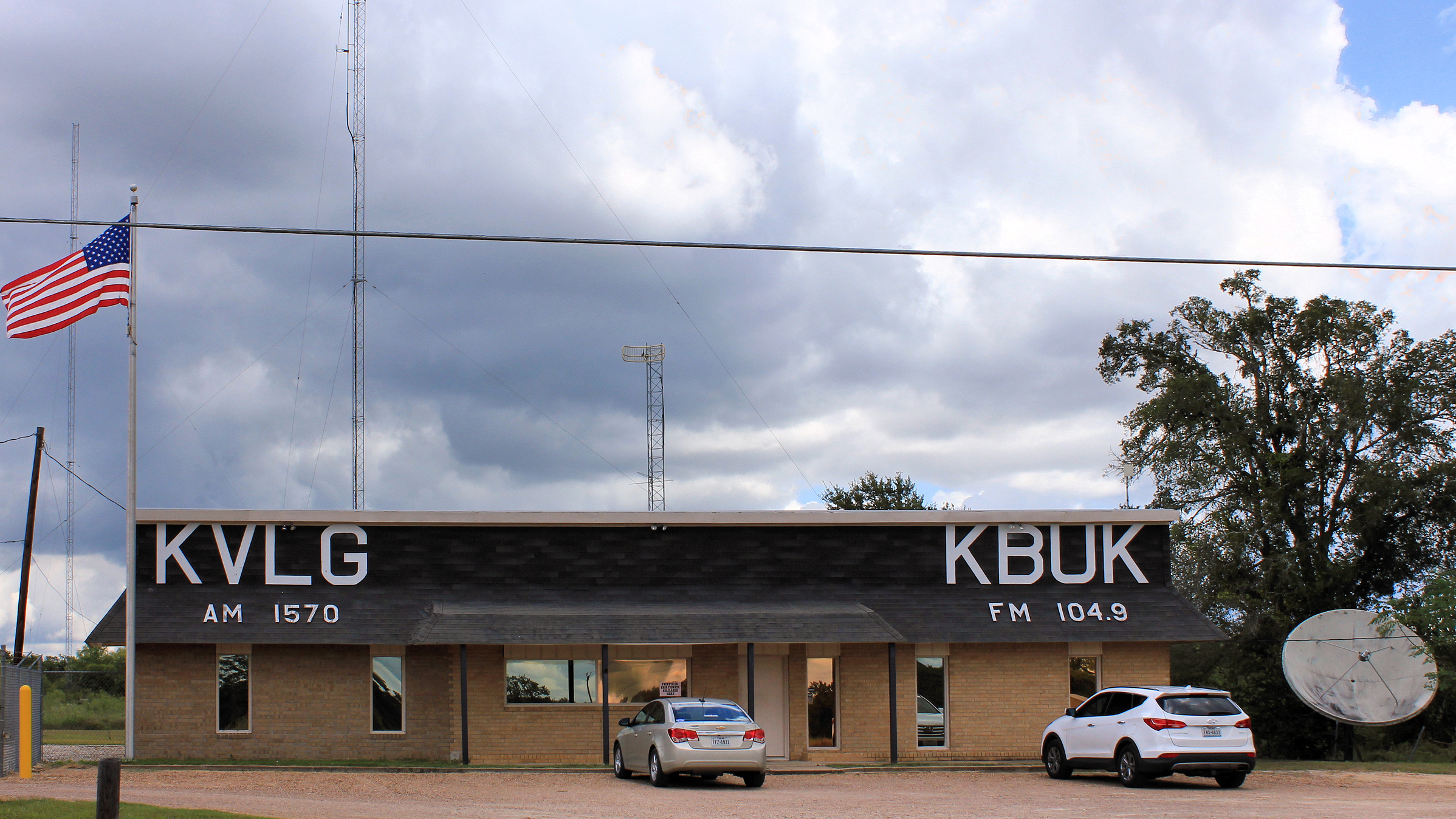
- La Grange, Texas; United States
- Frequency: 104.9 MHz
- Branding: K-Buck Country 104.9

Programming
- Format: Country music
- Affiliations: Real Country (Westwood One)

Ownership
- Owner: Kbuk Radio, Inc.
- Sister stations: KVLG

History
- First air date: September 7, 1971 (as KVLG-FM)
- Former call signs: KVLG-FM (1971–1977); KMUZ (1977–1988)
- Call sign meaning: KBUcK (station branding)

Technical information
- Licensing authority: FCC
- Facility ID: 21239
- Class: A
- ERP: 1,600 watts
- HAAT: 132.6 meters
- Transmitter coordinates: 29°52′57″N 96°51′58″W
- Repeater: 1570 KVLG (La Grange)

Links
- Public license information: Public file; LMS
- Website: http://kvlgkbuk.com/

KBUK (104.9 FM) is a terrestrial American radio station broadcasting a country music format, in simulcast with AM sister station KVLG. It is licensed to La Grange, Texas, United States. The station is owned by KBUK Radio, Inc. and features programming from Westwood One's Real Country 24/7 satellite.

== History ==
KBUK was initially proposed by Lloyd E. Kolbe, who owned AM station KVLG, in 1969. An application to establish a Class A 3 kilowatt ERP FM radio station, elevated at 205 meters height above average terrain, was granted by the Federal Communications Commission on May 15, 1970. The facility was constructed on Farm to Market Road 155, .4 miles southeast of U.S. Highway 77 near La Grange. The facility was assigned the callsign KVLG-FM by request on December 10, 1970, as the FM sister station to KVLG. The facility was constructed and received a License to Cover on September 7, 1971.

KVLG-FM changed its callsign to KMUZ on December 19, 1977, and to the current KBUK on November 1, 1988.
