= WLTI (AM) =

Coordinates: 39°55′59.2″N 85°24′25.9″W

New Castle, Indiana; United States
- Broadcast area: Henry County, Indiana
- Frequency: 1550 kHz

Programming
- Format: Defunct (was classic country)
- Affiliations: Real Country

Ownership
- Owner: Cumulus Media; (Radio License Holding CBC, LLC)
- Sister stations: WMDH-FM

History
- First air date: November 14, 1960
- Last air date: March 31, 2024
- Former call signs: WCTW (1960–1991); WMDH (1991–2010)
- Call sign meaning: Parked from the current WKLZ

Technical information
- Licensing authority: FCC
- Facility ID: 43435
- Class: B
- Power: 250 watts

Links
- Public license information: Public file; LMS

WLTI was a radio station licensed to New Castle, Indiana which served the Henry County, Indiana, radio market. It was a Real Country affiliate, which is a 24/7 format distributed by Cumulus Media Networks, a subsidiary of WLTI's owner, Cumulus Media. This station operated at a power of 250 watts on AM frequency 1550 kHz. During the day, WLTI broadcast with an omnidirectional pattern; at night, it broadcast with a directional signal to the southeast and southwest, to protect Class-A clear-channel stations CBEF in Windsor, Ontario and XERUV-AM in Xalapa, Mexico.

== History ==
Originally known for many years as WCTW airing traditional middle of the road programming, the station changed call letters to WMDH in 1991 to match up with its FM sister station. For many years, WMDH featured a news/talk format followed by a long stint as adult standards with programming supplied by the Music of Your Life 24/7 satellite format and later with Citadel Media's Timeless Classics.

In early 2010 Timeless ceased operations, forcing WMDH to change format. In early 2010, WMDH flipped to a gold-heavy country format to complement its sister station, WMDH-FM, utilizing Citadel Media's Real Country format. In 2010, Citadel Broadcasting opted to retain the call letters of a station that changed format in Syracuse, New York, to keep for future use. As the FCC does not allow stations to retain call letters that are not on a station's license, Citadel decided to 'park' them temporarily on WMDH. As a result, on March 19, 2010, 1550 AM became WLTI. The existing classic country format remained in place. Citadel merged with Cumulus Media on September 16, 2011.

The WCTW call letters are now used at an FM station in Hudson, New York. The WMDH-FM call letters continue to be used on WLTI's sister station in New Castle.

WLTI shut down on March 31, 2024. The Federal Communications Commission cancelled the station's license on April 26, 2024.
