= KLLA =

Coordinates: 31°08′28″N 93°17′44″W

- Leesville, Louisiana; United States
- Broadcast area: Vernon Parish
- Frequency: 1570 kHz

Programming
- Format: Oldies
- Affiliations: Westwood One

Ownership
- Owner: Pene Broadcasting Company, Inc.
- Sister stations: KJAE

History
- First air date: September 31, 1956; 69 years ago (first license granted)
- Call sign meaning: Leesville, Louisiana

Technical information
- Licensing authority: FCC
- Facility ID: 52139
- Class: D
- Power: 630 watts day 6 watts night

Links
- Public license information: Public file; LMS

KLLA (1570 kHz) is an American radio station broadcasting an Oldies music format. Licensed to Leesville, Louisiana, United States. The station is owned by Pene Broadcasting Company, Inc.
