= KPYK =

Coordinates: 32°45′17″N 96°14′22″W

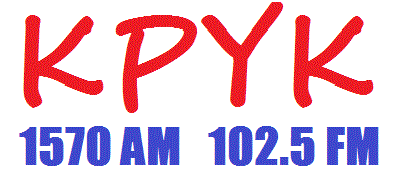
- Terrell, Texas; United States
- Broadcast area: Terrell and Vicinity
- Frequency: 1570 kHz
- Branding: KPYK 1570

Programming
- Format: Adult standards

Ownership
- Owner: Mohnkern Electronics

History
- First air date: 1949 (as KTER)
- Former call signs: KTER (1949–1992)
- Call sign meaning: The Pick of the Dial

Technical information
- Licensing authority: FCC
- Facility ID: 43433
- Class: D
- Power: 270 watts (Daytime); 6 watts (Nighttime)
- Translator: 102.5 K273DA (Terrell)

Links
- Public license information: Public file; LMS
- Website: KPYK Online

KPYK (1570 AM) is an adult standards radio station licensed to and serving the area around Terrell, Texas. The station is owned by Mohnkern Electronics.

== History ==
The station began in 1949 as KTER (callsign to have stood for its previous owner Terrell Tribune). According to the station's print advertisement in the 1973 Terrell High school Annual; the station's format was "News, Sports and Music". The station was only allowed to operate during the daytime hours. KTER was located at the American National Bank building on Moore Avenue in Terrell.

In 1992, KTER switched to its current callsign and format.

Mohnkern sold the station to the E Radio Network in August 2025.

Former logo
