= WABL =

- Amite, Louisiana; United States
- Broadcast area: Amite, Louisiana; Central Tangipahoa Parish, Louisiana
- Frequency: 1570 kHz
- Branding: Amazing 1570AM & 97.3FM

Programming
- Format: Classic hits

Ownership
- Owner: Ericka Taylor

History
- First air date: 1956

Technical information
- Licensing authority: FCC
- Facility ID: 2128
- Class: D
- Power: 500 watts daytime 15 watts nighttime
- Transmitter coordinates: 30°42′31.0″N 90°31′31.0″W
- Translator: 97.3 K247BJ (Amite)

Links
- Public license information: Public file; LMS

WABL is a classic hits formatted broadcast radio station licensed to Amite, Louisiana, serving Amite and Central Tangipahoa Parish, Louisiana. WABL is owned by Ericka Taylor.

== Translator ==
Call sign	Frequency	City of license	FID	ERP (W)	FCC info
K247BJ	97.3 FM	Amite City, Louisiana	147948	250	LMS
