= Senador Pompeu =

Municipality in Ceará, Brazil

Coordinates: 5°35′S 39°22′W

- Municipality
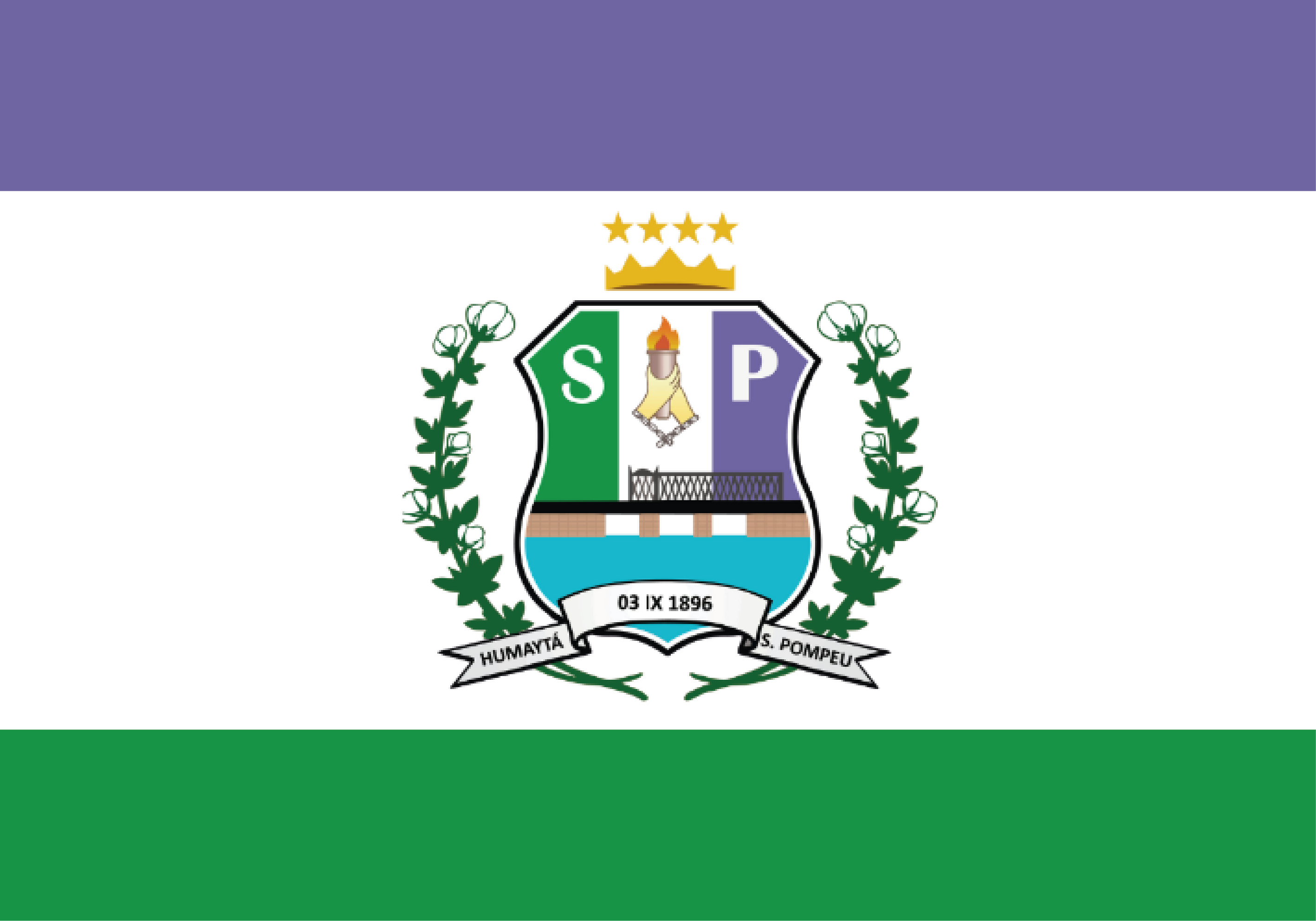
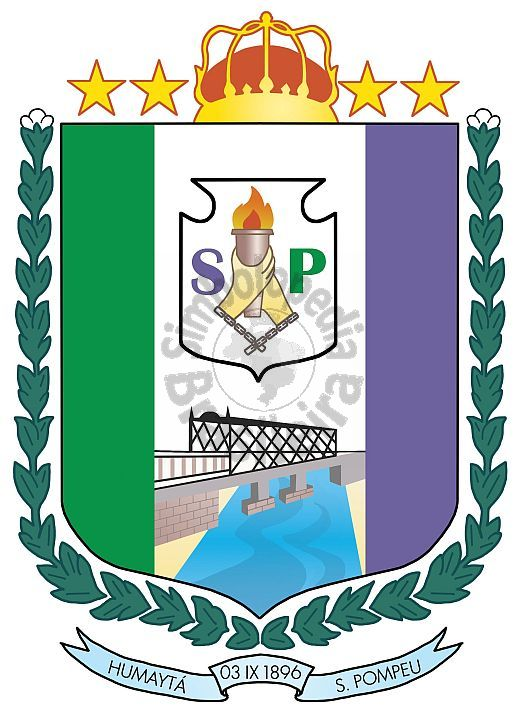
- Flag Coat of arms
- Interactive map of Senador Pompeu
- Country: Brazil
- Region: Nordeste
- State: Ceará
- Mesoregion: Sertoes Cearenses

Population (2020)
  - Total: 25,456
- Time zone: UTC−3 (BRT)

Senador Pompeu is a municipality in the state of Ceará in the Northeast region of Brazil.

== See also ==
- List of municipalities in Ceará
