= WOKC =

Classic country radio station in Okeechobee, Florida, US

Coordinates: 27°12′58.2″N 80°48′41.2″W

- Okeechobee, Florida; United States
- Broadcast area: Okeechobee, Florida
- Frequency: 1570 kHz

Programming
- Format: Classic country

Ownership
- Owner: Glades Media Group; (Glades Media Company LLP)

History
- First air date: February 6, 1962
- Call sign meaning: Okeechobee

Technical information
- Licensing authority: FCC
- Facility ID: 50166
- Class: D
- Power: 800 watts day; 12 watts night
- Translators: (96.7 MHz) W244DW (Okeechobee); (100.9 MHz) W265BV (Okeechobee)

Links
- Public license information: Public file; LMS
- Webcast: Listen live
- Website: www.wokc.com

WOKC (True Country) is a commercial radio station in Okeechobee, Florida, broadcasting to the Okeechobee area on 1570 AM and 100.9 FM. WOKC's format is classic country. It also broadcasts local and world news.

== FM translator ==
WOKC programming is relayed to an FM translator in order to widen the station's coverage area, especially during nighttime hours when the AM broadcasts with only 12 watts. The FM broadcasting frequency also gives the listener the ability to listen in stereophonic high fidelity sound.

Broadcast translators for WOKC
Call sign	Frequency	City of license	FID	ERP (W)	HAAT	Class	FCC info
W244DW	96.7 FM	Okeechobee, Florida	200629	250	17 m (56 ft)	D	LMS
W265BV	100.9 FM	Okeechobee, Florida	140493	250	54.2 m (178 ft)	D	LMS
