= KVLG =

Simulcasts KBUK La Grange

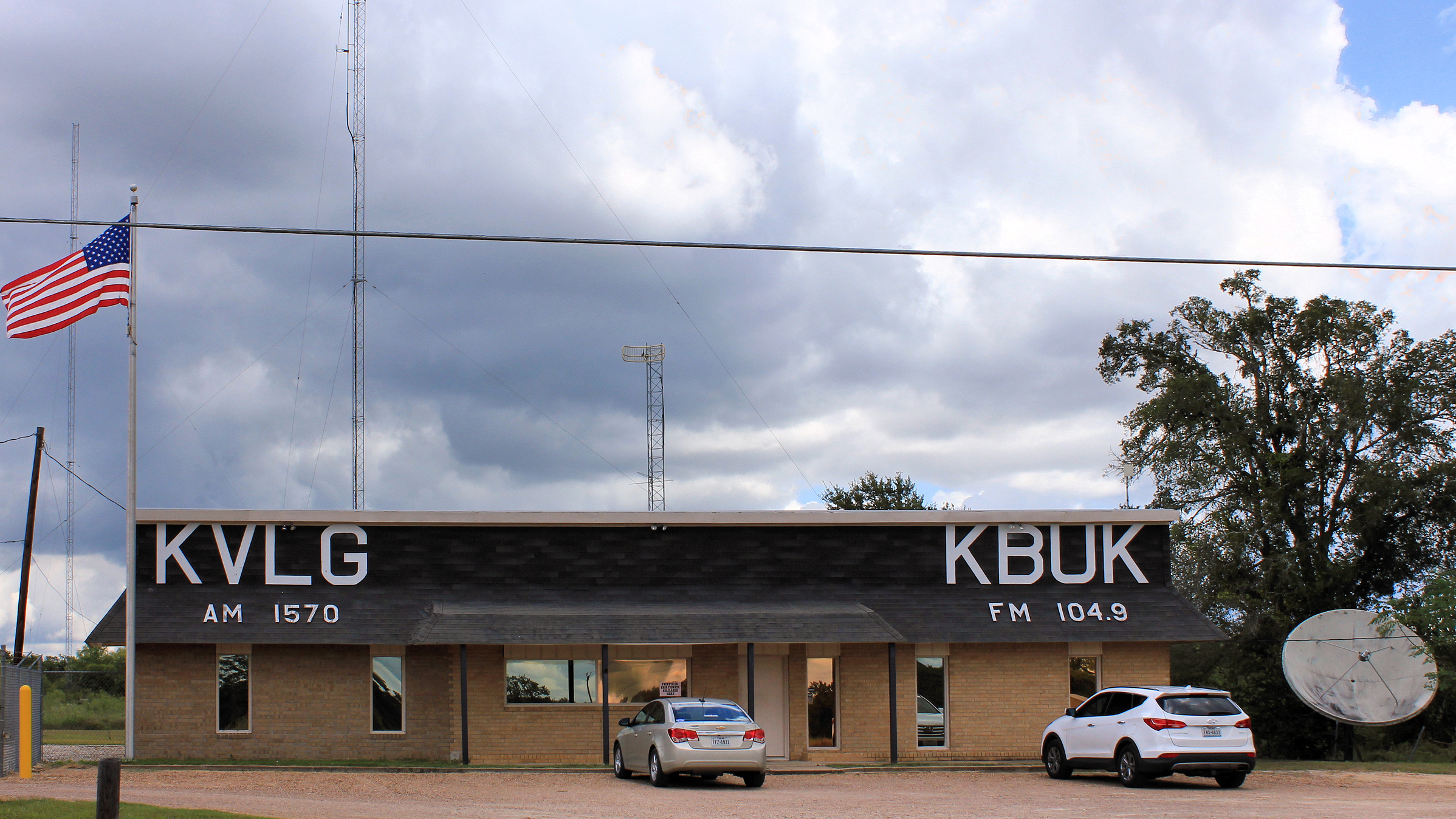
- La Grange, Texas; United States
- Frequency: 1570 kHz
- Branding: K-Buck Country 104.9

Programming
- Format: Country music
- Affiliations: Real Country (Westwood One)

Ownership
- Owner: Kbuk Radio, Inc.
- Sister stations: KBUK

History
- First air date: November 17, 1959

Technical information
- Licensing authority: FCC
- Facility ID: 21238
- Class: D
- ERP: 250 watts day 11 watts night
- Transmitter coordinates: 29°52′58.00″N 96°51′57.00″W

Links
- Public license information: Public file; LMS

KVLG (1570 AM) is a terrestrial American radio station licensed to La Grange, Texas, United States, simulcasting FM sister station KBUK, which airs a country music format. The station is owned by Kbuk Radio, Inc.
