= WZOE (AM) =

- Princeton, Illinois; United States
- Broadcast area: Princeton, Il and surrounding area
- Frequency: 1490 kHz
- Branding: Newstalk 1490 AM

Programming
- Format: News Talk Information
- Affiliations: CBS News Radio, Premiere Radio Networks, Westwood One

Ownership
- Owner: Fletcher Ford; (Virden Broadcasting Corp.)
- Sister stations: WRVY-FM, WZOE-FM

Technical information
- Licensing authority: FCC
- Facility ID: 74289
- Class: C
- Power: 1,000 watts unlimited
- Transmitter coordinates: 41°21′8.00″N 89°28′5.00″W

Links
- Public license information: Public file; LMS
- Website: regionalmedia.live/radio/illinois-valley/wzoe-am-1490//

WZOE (1490 kHz) is an AM radio station broadcasting a News Talk Information format. Licensed to Princeton, Illinois, United States, the station serves the LaSalle-Peru area.

Previous logo
