= WTLK =

Radio station in Taylorsville, North Carolina

- Taylorsville, North Carolina; United States
- Frequency: 1570 kHz

Programming
- Format: Southern Gospel

Ownership
- Owner: Apple City Broadcasting

Technical information
- Licensing authority: FCC
- Class: B
- Power: 900 watts day 198 watts night
- Transmitter coordinates: 35°55′54.7″N 81°10′16.7″W

Links
- Public license information: Public file; LMS

WTLK (1570 AM) is a radio station broadcasting a Southern Gospel format. Licensed to Taylorsville, North Carolina, United States. The station is currently owned by Apple City Broadcasting.
