= WLXB =

- Bethel, North Carolina; United States
- Broadcast area: Greenville-New Bern
- Frequency: 98.9 MHz
- Branding: K-Love

Programming
- Format: Contemporary Christian

Ownership
- Owner: Educational Media Foundation

History
- Former call signs: WDRP (1987–1990); WVSG (9/1990-10/1990); WDRP (1990–2002); WIAM-FM (2002–2004); WNBR-FM (2004–2015)

Technical information
- Licensing authority: FCC
- Facility ID: 53703
- Class: C3
- ERP: 11,200 watts
- HAAT: 149 meters (489 ft)
- Transmitter coordinates: 35°47′29.00″N 77°22′54.00″W
- Translator: 102.1 W271BT (Rocky Mount)

Links
- Public license information: Public file; LMS
- Webcast: Listen Live
- Website: klove.com

WLXB (98.9 FM) is a radio station airing a Contemporary Christian music format. Licensed to Bethel, North Carolina, United States, it serves the Greenville-New Bern area.

== History ==
WLXB went on the air in 1989 as WDRP. On 1990-09-03, the station changed its call sign to WVSG, on 1990-10-01 to WDRP, on 2002-09-01 to WIAM-FM, on 2004-05-17 to WNBR-FM, and on 2015-04-27 to WLXB.

From 2004 to 2015, WNBR-FM played classic country as "The Bear", simulcasting WNBB.
