= WILO =

Coordinates: 40°16′40″N 86°29′07″W

WILO AM/FM and Boone 102.7 FM
- Frankfort, Indiana Lebanon, Indiana; United States
- Broadcast area: Frankfort, Indiana; Thorntown, Indiana; Rossville, Indiana; Lebanon, Indiana; Flora, Indiana; Delphi, Indiana
- Frequencies: 1570 kHz, 96.9 FM and 102.7 FM
- Branding: WILO 96.9 FM, 1570 AM and "Boone's Best" 102.7 FM

Programming
- Format: Classic hits

Ownership
- Owner: Kaspar Broadcasting Co., Inc.

History
- First air date: November 23, 1953

Technical information
- Licensing authority: FCC
- Facility ID: 33468
- Class: B
- Power: 250 watts
- Translators: 96.9 W245CO (Frankfort); 102.7 W274CI (Lebanon, Indiana)

Links
- Public license information: AM/FM and Boone 102.7 FM Public file; LMS

WILO 96.9 FM, Boone 102.7 FM and 1570 AM are radio stations licensed to Frankfort, Indiana and Lebanon, Indiana, United States. WILO AM and W245CO 96.9 FM are licensed to Frankfort, Indiana. Boone 102.7 FM (W274CI) is licensed to Lebanon, Indiana. The three simulcast stations broadcast a classic hits format with local news, local sports, weather, Dave Ramsey and local, regional and national agricultural information. WILO AM/FM and Boone 102.7 FM also features a local, live talk show weekday mornings. This daily local talk show is also broadcast LIVE on HoosierlandTV.com. In Boone County, WILO is known as "Boone 102.7 FM."

Information about WILO and Kaspar Media is available at YesWeLoveLocal.com.

WILO maintains ClintonCountyDailyNews.com, BooneCountyDailyNews.com, CarrollCountyDailyNews.com, WeLoveBigDeals.com, IdeasAndSolutions360.com and a LIVE video stream channel for community events at www.HoosierlandTV.com.

WILO is owned by Kaspar Broadcasting Co., Inc.

Broadcast translators for WILO
Call sign	Frequency	City of license	FID	ERP (W)	HAAT	Class	FCC info
W245CO	96.9 FM	Frankfort, Indiana	155830	250	73.3 m (240 ft)	D	LMS
W274CI	102.7 FM	Lebanon, Indiana	202063	99	57.9 m (190 ft)	D	LMS
