= KTGE =

- Salinas, California; United States
- Broadcast area: Santa Cruz, California
- Frequency: 1570 kHz
- Branding: Joya 1570

Programming
- Format: Regional Mexican

Ownership
- Owner: Clarita and Jesse Portillo; (Big Radio Pro, Inc.)

History
- First air date: 1963
- Former call signs: KRSA (1963–1974); KKEE (1974–1976); KWYT (1976–1977); KXES (1977–1987)
- Call sign meaning: Tigre (previous branding)

Technical information
- Licensing authority: FCC
- Facility ID: 65375
- Class: B
- Power: 5,000 watts (day); 500 watts (night)
- Transmitter coordinates: 36°39′37.9″N 121°32′32.8″W

Links
- Public license information: Public file; LMS
- Website: joyaradio.com

KTGE (1570 AM) is a radio station broadcasting a Regional Mexican format. It is licensed to Salinas, California, United States, and serves the Santa Cruz area. The station is owned by Clarita and Jesse Portillo, through licensee Big Radio Pro, Inc.
