= WISP (AM) =

- Doylestown, Pennsylvania; United States
- Frequency: 1570 kHz

Programming
- Format: Religious

Ownership
- Owner: Holy Spirit Radio Foundation, Inc.

History
- First air date: 1948
- Former call signs: WBUX (1948–1999)

Technical information
- Licensing authority: FCC
- Facility ID: 48310
- Class: B
- Power: 5,000 watts day 900 watts night
- Transmitter coordinates: 40°19′34.00″N 75°9′40.00″W

Links
- Public license information: Public file; LMS
- Website: holyspiritradio.org

WISP (1570 AM) is a radio station broadcasting a religious format. Licensed to Doylestown, Pennsylvania, United States. The station is currently owned by Holy Spirit Radio Foundation, Inc.

== History ==
The station went on the air in 1948. WBUX went through multiple formats throughout many years. First as a country format in the 1960s, and later to MOR in 1970, Top 40 in 1975, and back to MOR a short time later. In 1988, the station dropped its MOR format for an Adult Standards format, but would later flip to News/Talk a year later. It remained as a talk station until flipping to a 1970s music format in 1994. Three years later in 1997, the format changed to an oldies format. A couple of years later, the station went back to news/talk before changing its callsign to WISP in 1999 and flipping to its current christian format.
