= WCOR =

- Lebanon, Tennessee; United States
- Frequency: 1490 kHz (AM stereo)
- Branding: Real Country FM 98.9/AM 1490 WANT/WCOR

Programming
- Format: Country music

Ownership
- Owner: Finbar Broadcasting Co.; (Bay Pointe Broadcasting)
- Sister stations: WANT

History
- Founded: 1949
- First air date: November 2005
- Call sign meaning: "Wilson County's Own Radio"

Technical information
- Licensing authority: FCC
- Facility ID: 129317
- Class: C
- Power: 1,000 watts
- Transmitter coordinates: 36°12′26.00″N 86°16′3.00″W

Links
- Public license information: Public file; LMS
- Website: wantfm.com

WCOR (1490 AM) is a radio station licensed to Lebanon, Tennessee, United States, and serving the eastern portion of the Nashville, Tennessee, market.

In its early years, WCOR functioned as a community-oriented station aimed primarily at residents of Wilson County, Tennessee. (It is licensed to the county seat of Wilson County, Lebanon). After this format became untenable in the 1980s (as it did for many small-town radio stations, particularly those located adjacent to major and mid-major markets), the station, after going dark for a period, resumed operation, marketing itself to particularly the eastern portion of the wider Nashville market. The majority of its programming now consists of a simulcast of its FM sister station, WANT, but some separate sports programming is also carried associated with Lebanon's Cumberland University.

In fall 2005, the station moved from 900 kHz, where it had spent nearly 60 years, to a newly licensed frequency of 1490 kHz.

The station is an affiliate of the Tennessee Titans radio network.
