= WZOE-FM =

- Princeton, Illinois; United States
- Broadcast area: LaSalle-Peru, Illinois
- Frequency: 98.1 MHz
- Branding: ICON 98.1

Programming
- Format: Classic hip hop

Ownership
- Owner: Fletcher Ford; (Virden Broadcasting Corp.)
- Sister stations: WZOE

History
- First air date: July 1, 1980

Technical information
- Licensing authority: FCC
- Facility ID: 74290
- Class: A
- ERP: 6,000 watts
- HAAT: 91 meters (299 ft)
- Transmitter coordinates: 41°21′49.00″N 89°23′36.00″W

Links
- Public license information: Public file; LMS

WZOE-FM (98.1 MHz) is a radio station broadcasting a classic hip hop format. Licensed to Princeton, Illinois, United States, the station serves the LaSalle-Peru area. The station is currently owned by Fletcher Ford, through licensee Virden Broadcasting Corp.

Former logo
