= WCAZ (990 AM) =

- Carthage, Illinois; United States
- Frequency: 990 kHz
- Branding: Talk 990

Programming
- Format: Talk/personality
- Affiliations: USA Radio Network

Ownership
- Owner: Ralla Broadcasting Co.

History
- First air date: May 15, 1922 (initial licensing date)
- Last air date: December 31, 2017 (Note: End of unlicensed operation; the license had been canceled on April 21, 2017.)
- Call sign meaning: sequentially assigned

Technical information
- Facility ID: 7634
- Class: D
- Power: 1,000 watts day; 9 watts night
- Transmitter coordinates: 40°24′32″N 91°10′13″W

WCAZ (990 AM, "Talk 990") was a commercial radio station, whose operating license was cancelled by the Federal Communications Commission (FCC) on April 21, 2017. First licensed in May 1922, WCAZ had been one of the oldest radio stations in the United States. At the time of its deletion the station was licensed to the Ralla Broadcasting Company in Carthage, Illinois, and featured a talk/personality format.

Following the license cancellation, in the opinion of the FCC the station effectively began operating as a pirate radio station, when it continued regular broadcasts, still identifying itself as "WCAZ", despite FCC orders to cease. The station finally ended operations shortly after noon CST on December 31, 2017.

== History ==
WCAZ was first licensed on May 15, 1922, to Robert E. Compton and the Quincy Whig-General newspaper in Quincy, Illinois, operating on the shared 360 meter (833 kHz) "entertainment" wavelength. The WCAZ call letters were randomly assigned from a sequential roster of available call signs. In December 1922 the station became jointly owned by Compton and Carthage College, and was moved to the college's campus in Carthage, Illinois. In 1923 the station moved to 1220 kHz, and the college assumed sole ownership in September. WCAZ was deleted on September 8, 1924, relicensed on November 8, 1924, deleted again on November 2, 1925, and relicensed on September 11, 1926.

Following the establishment of the Federal Radio Commission (FRC), stations were initially issued a series of temporary authorizations starting on May 3, 1927. WCAZ was reassigned to 880 kHz on June 15, 1927, and to 1200 kHz later that year. Stations were also notified that if they wanted to continue operating, they needed to file a formal license application by January 15, 1928, as the first step in determining whether they met the new "public interest, convenience, or necessity" standard. On May 25, 1928, the FRC issued General Order 32, which notified 164 stations, including WCAZ, that "From an examination of your application for future license it does not find that public interest, convenience, or necessity would be served by granting it." However, the station successfully convinced the commission that it should remain licensed.

On November 11, 1928, under the provisions of the FRC's General Order 40, the station was assigned to 1070 kHz, with daylight only operation. Carthage College continued to operate WCAZ until February 21, 1930, when the station was sold back to Robert Compton and his associates, doing business as the Superior Broadcasting Company.

With the implementation of the North American Regional Broadcasting Agreement, on March 29, 1941, most of the stations on 1070 kHz moved to 1100 kHz. However, due to interference concerns, WCAZ was shifted to 1080 kHz. In 1947, WCAZ was authorized to move to its final assignment, 990 kHz.

Robert Compton died at the age of 54 in June 1950, and station ownership was then transferred to Zola N. Compton.

=== Station deletion ===
On January 31, 2007, the Federal Communications Commission (FCC) assessed WCAZ a fine of $3,500, for failing to file a timely license renewal application. However, the station failed to pay, and on April 21, 2017, the Ralla Broadcasting Company's Robin R. Dunham was sent a certified letter by the FCC, informing him that because WCAZ had not made any arrangements to pay the fine, "all authority to operate station WCAZ(AM), Carthage, Illinois, IS TERMINATED" and the station's license and call letters had been cancelled and deleted.

Contrary to the FCC order, the station continued to make regular broadcasts as "WCAZ", thus technically becoming an unlicensed pirate radio station. On June 28, 2017, in response to a complaint that the station had failed to end operations, an agent from the FCC's Chicago Enforcement Bureau determined that Dunham was continuing to operate a 975-watt transmitter on 990 kHz, and informed the FCC that he had "refused to cease operating the AM station". On December 8, the FCC sent a follow-up letter to Dunham ordering that the "unlicensed operation of this radio station must be discontinued immediately", and warning him of potential legal consequences if he did not comply. A local TV station report on the situation quoted Dunham as claiming he had contacted the FCC and was operating legally, although he planned to cease operations at 5 p.m. on December 31, 2017. The station actually ended programming shortly after noon CST on December 31, 2017. Following the broadcast of a local church service and a series of community messages, the station went silent without fanfare, closing with the simple statement "From all of us to all of you, thank you."

In response to the loss of Carthage's only local radio station, a group effort was formed to reestablish a station. Effective September 24, 2018, WYEC (AM 1510) in nearby Macomb, Illinois, was purchased by Hancock County Broadcasting, LLC, which changed WYEC's call sign to WCAZ, and relocated the station to Carthage.

== See also ==
- List of initial AM-band station grants in the United States
