= WKLZ =

K-Love radio station in Syracuse, New York

- Syracuse, New York; United States
- Broadcast area: Central New York
- Frequency: 105.9 MHz
- Branding: K-Love

Programming
- Format: Contemporary Christian music
- Network: K-Love

Ownership
- Owner: Educational Media Foundation

History
- First air date: 1996
- Former call signs: WXCD (1996); WLTI (1996–2010); WXTL (2010–2020)
- Call sign meaning: "K-Love"

Technical information
- Licensing authority: FCC
- Facility ID: 58719
- Class: A
- ERP: 4,000 watts
- HAAT: 61 meters (200 ft)
- Transmitter coordinates: 43.058°N 76.166°W

Links
- Public license information: Public file; LMS
- Webcast: Listen Live
- Website: www.klove.com

WKLZ (105.9 FM) is a non-commercial radio station operating under a licensing agreement by the Educational Media Foundation (EMF), and carries the contemporary Christian music format of its nationally syndicated network K-Love for the Syracuse, New York, area.

== History ==
For most of the 2000s, WLTI was branded as "Lite 105.9" or "Lite Rock 105.9" and had an adult contemporary music format that varied between "soft AC" (during the Lite years) and "hot AC" (during the later "Lite Rock" period). Programming during this period included Dave Allen (mornings during the "Lite" period), Robin Marshall (under the alias "Jayne," middays), Phil Spevak (under the alias "Brian Phillips," afternoons), Bob and Sheri (mornings during the "Lite Rock" time period), and Delilah (evenings).

WLTI made the switch to news/talk, branded as WXTL "105.9 The Big Talker", in early March 2010, following a brief stunt with TV theme songs as "TV 105.9". Gary Nolan was the station's lone local weekday talk program; the rest of the lineup was culled from an eclectic mix of third-tier programming not already heard on its long-established competitors, WSYR or WFBL.

On January 6, 2012, at 10 am, after The Bob & Tom Show, WXTL began stunting again as "TV 105.9" airing television show theme songs only. At 1:05 pm, the station switched to classic rock as "105.9 The Rebel" with The Bob & Tom Show continuing in mornings. The first song on The Rebel was "Rebel Yell" by Billy Idol. Dave Frisina (WAQX 1978-2003, WTKW 2003-2011) was brought in to program the station as a classic rock station with a broader playlist and more local programming. Additional personalities include Roger McCue and Holly Dagger.

On February 13, 2019, Cumulus Media announced it would sell six stations, including WXTL, to Educational Media Foundation for $103.5 million. On May 31, 2019, EMF flipped WXTL to the foundation's K-Love network that had been carried on WGKV (FM 101.7), a rimshot signal north of Syracuse. As a result, one of EMF's other formats (worship music Air1 or classic Christian hits K-Love Classics) was likely to be introduced to the Syracuse market on one of the two stations. On April 23, 2020, the station changed its call sign to WKLZ.

=== Continuation of former WXTL programming online after the sale ===
Shortly after the announcement, Cumulus announced that the "Rebel" format would be moved online, with Frisina remaining in his position. The online-only iteration of The Rebel proved to be enough of a success to allow an air staff to be hired for the station.

Frisina was dismissed March 28, 2022, along with the remaining airstaff, with Frisina noting that the station was about to undergo a "transition" and that Cumulus had rejected his offer to continue hosting his specialty weekend shows. On August 24, 2022, The Rebel was rebranded as "The SGNL" and changed its format to adult album alternative. SGNL was discontinued some time before August 2026, when its remaining staff position (at that time filled by WAQX assistant program director Scott Dixon) eliminating in a broader cost-cutting measure by Cumulus in that month; its Web site redirects to WAQX's.
