= WMDH-FM =

Coordinates: 40.055°N 85.385°W

- New Castle, Indiana; United States
- Broadcast area: Muncie, Indiana
- Frequency: 102.5 MHz
- Branding: 102.5 WMDH

Programming
- Format: Country music
- Affiliations: Compass Media Networks; Westwood One

Ownership
- Owner: Cumulus Media; (Radio License Holding CBC, LLC)

History
- First air date: 1947; 79 years ago
- Former call signs: WMDH (1947–1991)

Technical information
- Licensing authority: FCC
- Facility ID: 74092
- Class: B
- ERP: 50,000 watts
- HAAT: 152 metres (499 ft)

Links
- Public license information: Public file; LMS
- Webcast: Listen live Listen Live (iHeart)
- Website: wmdh.com

WMDH-FM (102.5 MHz) is a radio station licensed to New Castle, Indiana, and serves the Muncie-Marion, Indiana, radio market with a country music format. The station operates at an effective radiated power of 50,000 watts under ownership of Cumulus Media. Its studios are located in New Castle with tower facilities located between New Castle and Muncie near the Delaware/Henry County line. On September 6, 2013, WMDH dropped the "Hit Country 102.5 WMDH" branding and became "Nash FM 102.5".

On July 9, 2026, the station rebranded back as "102.5 WMDH."

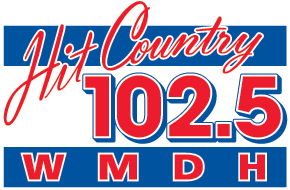
Logo as "Hit Country 102.5"

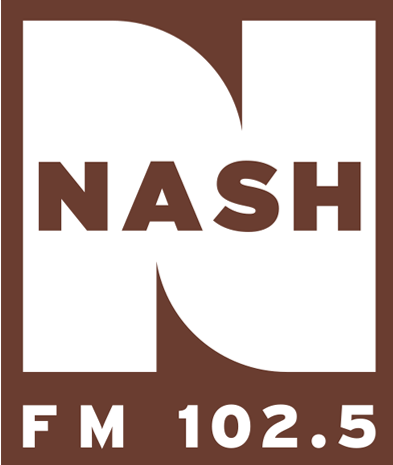
Logo as "Nash FM 102.5"
