= WSWV (AM) =

Radio station in Pennington Gap, Virginia

- Pennington Gap, Virginia; United States
- Broadcast area: Pennington Gap, Virginia; Lee County, Virginia
- Frequency: 1570 kHz

Programming
- Format: Country music

Ownership
- Owner: (Cumberland Broadcasting LLC)

History
- First air date: 1959
- Former call signs: WSWV (1958–2022); WHNQ (2022–2024)

Technical information
- Licensing authority: FCC
- Facility ID: 36893
- Class: B
- Power: 2,300 watts (day); 191 watts (night)
- Transmitter coordinates: 36°44′2.0″N 83°2′34.0″W
- Translator: 101.9 W270CB (Pennington Gap)

Links
- Public license information: Public file; LMS
- Webcast: Listen live
- Website: wswv.net

WSWV is a Country Music formatted broadcast radio station licensed to Pennington Gap, Virginia, United States, serving Pennington Gap and Lee County, Virginia. WSWV is owned by Cumberland Broadcasting LLC.

WSWV was assigned that call sign originally by the Federal Communications Commission on November 6, 1959. The station changed its call sign to WHNQ on December 31, 2022, and back to WSWV on February 7, 2024.

== Translator ==
In addition to the main station, WSWV is relayed by an FM translator to widen its broadcast area.

Call sign	Frequency	City of license	FID	ERP (W)	HAAT	Class	FCC info
W270CB	101.9 FM	Pennington Gap, Virginia	2474	200	95.7 m (314 ft)	D	LMS
