= WCAZ =

Coordinates: 40°24′31″N 91°10′13″W

- Carthage, Illinois; United States
- Frequency: 1510 kHz

Programming
- Format: Farm; country
- Affiliations: Real Country (Westwood One)

Ownership
- Owner: Hancock County Broadcasting, LLC

History
- First air date: 1947
- Former call signs: WKAI (1947–1984); WLRB (1984–2016); WYEC (2016–2018)

Technical information
- Licensing authority: FCC
- Facility ID: 60017
- Class: D
- Power: 330 watts (daytime)
- Translator: 99.1 W256DZ (Carthage)

Links
- Public license information: Public file; LMS
- Webcast: Listen live
- Website: wcazradio.com

WCAZ (1510 kHz) is a farm/country formatted AM radio station, licensed to Carthage, Illinois. Because the station shares the same frequency as clear-channel station WLAC in Nashville, Tennessee, WCAZ broadcasts only during the daytime. However, its FM translator, W256DZ on 99.1 MHz, also provides nighttime operation.

== History ==
=== Establishment in Macomb ===
This station was first licensed in 1947, as WKAI in Macomb, Illinois. However, the station has traditionally traced its history to the original WCAZ, which was first licensed in Carthage in 1922.

On June 1, 1984, WKAI's call letters were changed to WLRB. For a time, WLRB carried the Music of Your Life radio network, but Jones Radio Networks divested it in favor of its own Jones Standards format. As Dial Global acquired Jones, the "Jones Standards" network was dissolved and "America's Best Music" took its place. WLRB later switched to talk programming.

WLRB was owned by Prairie Radio Communications/WPW Broadcasting, Inc. until January 2009, when it was bought by Nancy Foster's Colchester Radio, Inc. to become part of Prestige Communications.

Effective November 30, 2015, WLRB and five sister stations were sold to Fletcher Ford's Virden Broadcasting Corporation at a purchase price of $725,000. The station changed its call sign to WYEC on August 31, 2016.

=== Move to Carthage as WCAZ ===
On April 21, 2017, the license and call letters of WCAZ (990 AM) in Carthage were cancelled and the station deleted by the Federal Communications Commission, due to an unpaid fine, that had been levied a decade earlier for failure to file a timely license renewal application. This station continued to make regular broadcasts as "WCAZ", thus technically becoming an unlicensed pirate radio station, until it ended operations on December 31, 2017.

A group effort was organized to restore a local station in Carthage. Effective September 24, 2018, WYEC and its translator W226CH were sold by Virden Broadcasting to Hancock County Broadcasting, LLC for $75,000. The new owners changed the station's call sign to WCAZ, and flipped the format from talk to full-service classic country on the same day. The station was relocated to Carthage, with its daytime power of 1,000 watts reduced to 330 watts, and the critical hours operation at 250 watts eliminated. Translator W226CH was also moved to Carthage, and in 2020 transferred to 99.1 MHz, resulting in a call sign change to W256DZ.

In May 2022, this new WCAZ held a 100-year anniversary celebration, tracing its history back to the original WCAZ's initial license date of May 15, 1922.
