= Melissa Neeley =

Melissa Neeley (born September 1, 1972) is an American broadcast journalist, actress, and film producer. She started out as the weekend news anchor on WHIO-FM in Dayton, Ohio. She then became News Director at Monticello Media in Charlottesville, Virginia, on November 1, 2007. Neeley anchored the morning news on Newstalk WCHV 1260 AM and 107.5 FM. She also produced and hosted "Charlottesville This Week", which airs weekends on WCHV, WCHV-FM, WCYK, WHTE, WHUK and WKAV. Under her direction, in 2009 WCHV received the runner-up award for Most Outstanding Newscast by Virginia Association of Broadcasters. In January 2012, Neeley resigned her position with Monticello Media and became employed with Clear Channel Media And Entertainment, now IHeartMedia, in Cincinnati, Oh. Since January 9, 2012, Neeley has been a News Anchor and Reporter for WLW and WKRC (AM). Neeley has been a guest reporter on HLN's Nancy Grace show since 2010, giving information about news stories from Virginia and the Ohio Valley.

She is also a former member of The Bent Theatre, a comedy improv group in Charlottesville, Virginia. She has worked with film director John Johnson in both the 2011 film Shadowhunters:Lost and in the 2015 film "Plan 9". Neeley played the store clerk's wife in Shadowhunters:Lost. She was an associate producer and a zombie extra in the movie Plan 9. She is credited as Melissa Renee Neeley in both films.
