= WFNR =

- Blacksburg, Virginia; United States
- Broadcast area: New River Valley
- Frequency: 710 kHz

Ownership
- Owner: Monticello Media; (WFNR AM, LLC)
- Sister stations: WBRW, WVHK, WPSK, WRAD, WRAD-FM

History
- First air date: 1974
- Last air date: January 31, 2019
- Former call signs: WQBX (1974–1984); WNRB (1984)
- Call sign meaning: First in the New River Valley

Technical information
- Facility ID: 67588
- Class: D
- Power: 10,000 watts (days only)
- Transmitter coordinates: 37°8′1″N 80°21′18″W

WFNR was a news/talk formatted broadcast radio station licensed to Blacksburg, Virginia, serving the New River Valley. WFNR was last owned and operated by Monticello Media after its 2018 purchase of Cumulus Media's Blacksburg–Christiansburg cluster.

WFNR went off the air on January 31, 2019, due to equipment failures at its transmitter site. The station had special temporary authority to remain silent until July 31.

WFNR never returned to the air, resulting in the forfeit of its license after the one-year deadline to do so imposed by the Telecommunications Act of 1996 passed. It was deleted from the FCC's database on February 11, 2022.
