= WVAX =

- Charlottesville, Virginia; United States
- Broadcast area: Charlottesville, Virginia; Albemarle County, Virginia
- Frequency: 1450 kHz
- Branding: Fox Sports 102.9

Programming
- Format: Sports
- Affiliations: Fox Sports Radio

Ownership
- Owner: Saga Communications; (Tidewater Communications, LLC)
- Sister stations: WCNR; WCVL-FM; WINA; WQMZ; WWWV

History
- First air date: January 20, 2006
- Last air date: February 13, 2025 (19 years, 23 days)

Technical information
- Facility ID: 161156
- Class: C
- Power: 1,000 watts
- Transmitter coordinates: 38°2′54.5″N 78°28′11″W
- Translator: 102.9 W275CL (Charlottesville)

Links
- Website: www.wvax.com

WVAX (1450 AM) was a sports formatted broadcast radio station licensed to Charlottesville, Virginia, serving Charlottesville and Albemarle County, Virginia. WVAX was owned by Saga Communications, and operated as part of its Charlottesville Radio Group. It operated from 2006 to 2025, launching with a progressive talk format before switching to sports in 2011.

== History ==
WVAX was Charlottesville's newest AM station. The initial construction permit was applied for in January 2004 by Anderson Communications LLC, owned by Charles M. Anderson of Bowling Green, Kentucky, who holds separate interests in several FM stations in that state. The construction permit was granted in September 2005, and by the end of the month Anderson sold it to Saga Communications for $150,000.

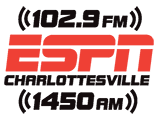
Logo as an ESPN Radio affiliate

Saga put the station on the air on January 20, 2006, with a progressive talk format from Air America. Air America ceased national programming in January 2010, precipitating format changes at many of its affiliates. WVAX continued with the talk format until April 1, 2011, when it flipped to national sports radio programming from ESPN Radio.

In May 2016, WVAX signed-on a 100-watt FM translator on 103.1 MHz from the Charlottesville antenna farm on Carter Mountain. This translator attracted opposition from Piedmont Communications, and listeners of their co-channel WJMA in Culpeper filed interference complaints. Saga's investigation into the interference was largely inconclusive, as several persons admitted that they did not personally experience interference and only complained after a DJ prompted them on-air, while others refused to meet with investigators or did not respond to follow-ups at all. In June 2017, Saga moved the translator to 102.9 MHz to end the dispute without admitting wrongdoing.

On July 31, 2023, WVAX switched affiliations from ESPN Radio to Fox Sports Radio and rebranded as "Fox Sports 102.9".

Saga surrendered the station’s license to the Federal Communications Commission on February 13, 2025. The 102.9 translator continues with the same programming, originating instead on an HD Radio subchannel of WWWV (97.5 FM).

== Translator ==
In addition to the main station, WVAX was relayed by an FM translator to widen its broadcast area.

Broadcast translator for WVAX
Call sign	Frequency	City of license	FID	ERP (W)	HAAT	Class	FCC info
W275CL	102.9 FM	Charlottesville, Virginia	141162	120	92 m (302 ft)	D	LMS
