= Nealy =

Nealy is a surname that may refer to:

- Barrick Nealy (born 1983), American and Canadian football quarterback
- Ed Nealy (born 1960), American basketball player
- Frances E. Nealy (1918–1997), American actress and dancer
- Mike Nealy, American sports executive
- Quayshawn Nealy (born 1991), American former football linebacker

First name:

- Arthur Kenealy (Nealy) Crosland (1880 – 1929, English rugby league player
- Nealy Cameron Martin (born 1998), American soccer player
- Nealy Phelps

Other:

- Nealy Gordon Farm a farm in Montgomery County, Virginia
- Nealy Ridge an unincorporated community in Dickenson County, Virginia

== See also ==
- Neely
- Neeley
