= WCHV =

WCHV may refer to:

- WCHV (AM), a radio station broadcasting at 1260 kHz on the AM band, licensed to Charlottesville, Virginia
- WCHV-FM, a radio station broadcasting at 107.5 MHz on the FM band, licensed to Charlottesville, Virginia
