= WTON =

WTON may refer to:

- WTON (AM), a radio station (1240 AM) licensed to Staunton, Virginia, United States
- WTON-FM, a radio station (94.3 FM) licensed to Staunton, Virginia, United States
