= Joe Thomas (talk show host) =

Joe Thomas (born September 13, 1963) is an American conservative syndicated morning talk radio host and radio station owner of WTON 1240 AM and 98.9 and 101.1 FM.

== Career ==
He graduated Bayside High School in New York City where he developed an interest in broadcasting. Disappointed with the broadcasting opportunities in his college (CUNY; Queens College) he took a turn to restaurant management at several Burger King restaurants in Queens, NY. (His father had helped establish the chains footprint in the area in the 1960s with Mallory Restaurants.) He returned to radio in 1986 at Graiff Communications WPUT in Brewster, NY.

Prior to Charlottesville, he hosted talk shows on 1150 WDEL in Wilmington, Delaware and on 1420 WCOJ in West Chester, Pennsylvania. He has also hosted morning drive shows on WTSS "Star 102.5" in Buffalo, NY; "FM97" WLAN-FM in Lancaster, Pennsylvania; "Beaver 103" WBHV in State College, Pennsylvania; WPXC in Hyannis, Massachusetts and WRCN on Long Island.

Prior to purchasing WTON, Thomas was the morning show host on WCHV 1260 AM and 107.5 FM. For a period of time while at WCHV, Joe also hosted The Afternoon Constitutional radio show in Charlottesville, Virginia.[1] He also serves as the station's programming director and the programming director of sister station "Sports Radio 1400", WKAV.

== Personal life ==
Thomas is the son of Ruth and Joe Thomas. He is married to Elaine Thomas (née Connolly) since May 1, 1993 and is father to Taylor Campbell, Kyle Crawford and Morgan MacDonald Thomas.
