= WNRN =

WNRN may refer to:

- WNRN (AM), a radio station (1590 AM) licensed to serve Richmond, Virginia, United States
- WNRN-FM, a radio station (91.9 FM) licensed to serve Charlottesville, Virginia
