= WRAD =

WRAD may refer to:

- WRAD (AM), a radio station (1460 AM) licensed to serve Radford, Virginia, United States
- WRAD-FM, a radio station (101.7 FM) licensed to serve Radford, Virginia
