= Michael Neal =

Michael Neal may refer to:

- Michael Shane Neal (born 1968), American portrait artist
- Mike Neal (born 1987), American football linebacker

== See also ==
- Michael Neale (born 1958), British behavior geneticist and professor
- Mike Nealy (fl. 2010s–2020s), American sports executive
- Michael Neill (born 1994), Australian footballer
- Mike Neill (born 1970), American baseball player
- Michael O'Neal (born 1951), American lawyer and politician
