= WVCW =

WVCW may refer to:

- WVCW (FM) (99.5 FM), formerly known as WJBR-FM, a non-commercial FM radio station licensed to Wilmington, Delaware
- WVCW (Virginia Commonwealth University), a radio station at Virginia Commonwealth University, formerly on FM and now online-only
