= WRJR =

Radio station in Claremont, Virginia

Simulcasts WNRN-FM, Charlottesville
- Claremont, Virginia; United States
- Broadcast area: Hampton Roads
- Frequency: 670 kHz
- Branding: WNRN

Programming
- Format: Adult album alternative

Ownership
- Owner: Stu-Comm, Inc.
- Sister stations: WHAN, WNRN, WNRN-FM, WNRS-FM

History
- First air date: 1997
- Former call signs: WARO (1989–1994, CP); WBVS (1994–1995, CP); WVNS (1995–1999); WRJR (1999–2000); WHRP (2000–2001); WRJR (2001–2004); WPMH (2004–2010)

Technical information
- Licensing authority: FCC
- Facility ID: 68741
- Class: D
- Power: 1,000 watts day (STA); 3 watts night
- Transmitter coordinates: 37°10′29.0″N 76°53′49.0″W
- Translators: 102.5 W273DZ (Norfolk); 103.3 W277EB (Williamsburg)

Links
- Public license information: Public file; LMS
- Webcast: Listen Live
- Website: wnrn.org

WRJR (670 AM) is an adult album alternative formatted broadcast radio station licensed to Claremont, Virginia, serving Hampton Roads. WRJR is owned by Stu-Comm, Inc.

670 AM is a United States clear-channel frequency on which WSCR in Chicago and KDLG in Dillingham, Alaska, both share Class A status. WRJR must reduce power from sunset to sunrise to prevent interference to the nighttime skywave signals of the Class A stations.

WRJR is a full-time repeater of WNRN-FM, based in Charlottesville.

== History ==
The station's initial construction permit was issued in 1989. After 7 years and two sales of the permit, WVNS signed on in August 1997 with an all-news format. The first owner was longtime Norfolk-area talk show host Pat Murphy, who had launched WVNZ in Richmond with the same format earlier in the year. Programming was largely sourced from AP Radio and Bloomberg Radio, as well as traffic and weather every 10 minutes and simulcasts of WAVY-TV's noon and 6 PM newscasts. In 1999, Murphy sold to Chesapeake-Portsmouth Broadcasting Corporation, which flipped to a gospel and Christian teaching format. The station was donated to Iglesia Nueva Vida of High Point, North Carolina, in 2012, and changed to a Spanish-language Christian teaching format originating at their WGOS in that city. In October 2022, Stu-Comm, Inc., purchased the station and its newly built FM translator, W273DZ (102.5 MHz) in Norfolk, for $310,000.

== Transmission ==
WRJR's tower is located near Surry, Virginia, which allows the station's daytime signal to cover all of Hampton Roads, but with its extremely low nighttime power, the station essentially broadcasts to only Surry proper at night.

670 AM is United States clear-channel frequency on which WSCR in Chicago, Illinois, is the dominant Class A station. WRJR reduces nighttime power to avoid interfering with WSCR's nighttime skywave signal.

=== Translators ===
Call sign	Frequency	City of license	FID	ERP (W)	Class	FCC info
W273DZ	102.5 FM	Norfolk, Virginia	201653	250	D	LMS
W277EB	103.3 FM	Williamsburg, Virginia	158513	250	D	LMS
