= Bayside High School (Queens) =

Public school in New York City

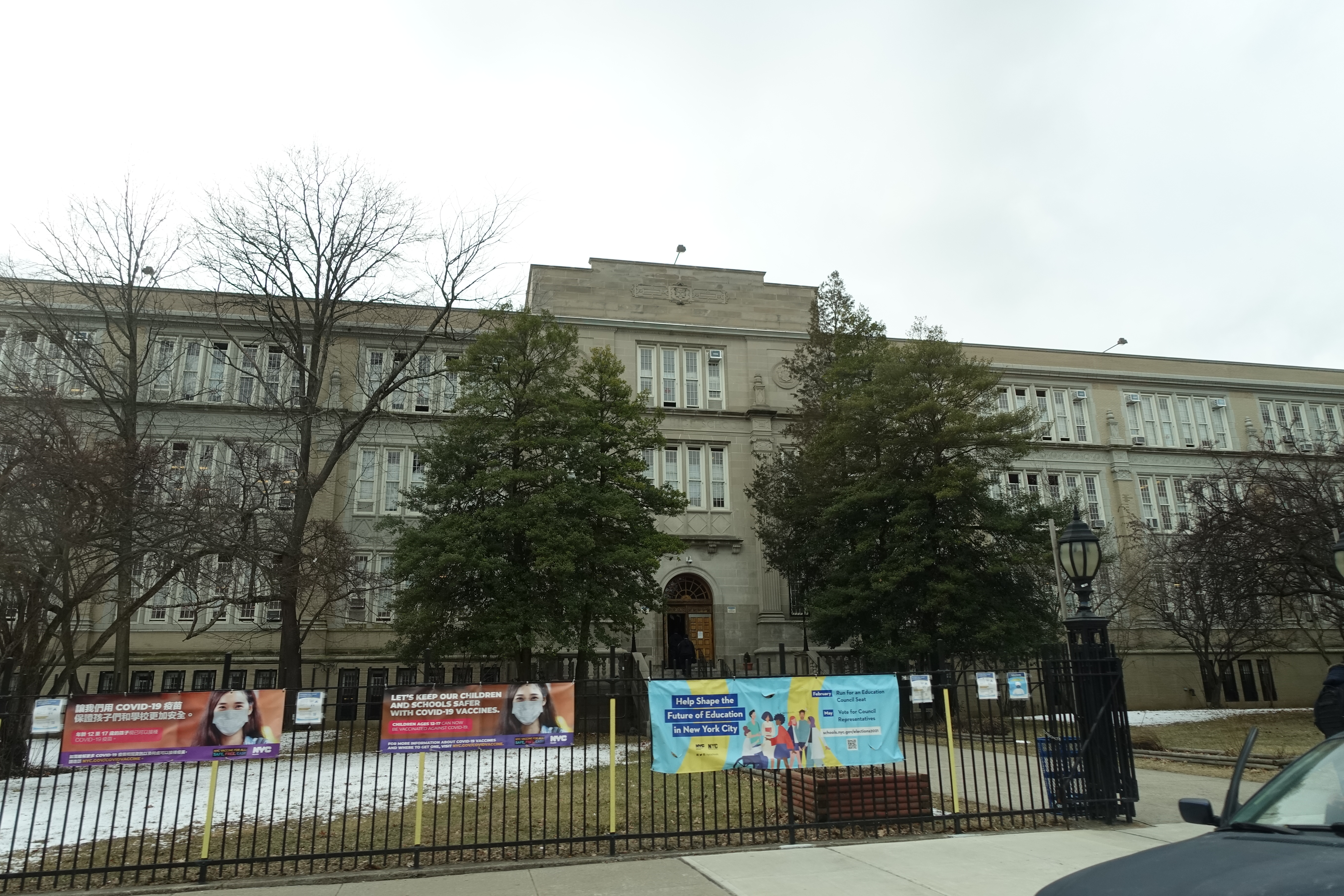

Location
- 32-24 Corp Kennedy St; Bayside, Queens, New York 11361; United States
- 40°46′17″N 73°46′51″W

Information
- Type: Public
- Motto: Anchored in Excellence
- Established: March 16, 1936
- School district: New York City Department of Education
- School number: 26Q495
- NCES School ID: 360009901917
- Principal: Tracy Martinez
- Teaching staff: 179.74 (on an FTE basis)
- Grades: 9-12
- Enrollment: 3,010 (2023-2024)
- Student to teacher ratio: 16.75
- Campus: City: Large
- Colors: Blue and Orange
- Mascot: Commodores
- Newspaper: The Baysider
- Yearbook: Triangle
- Website: www.baysidehighschool.org

Bayside High School is an American public high school located in the Bayside neighborhood of the New York City borough of Queens. It is administered by the New York City Department of Education.

== Performance ==
Bayside is one of the Highest performing schools in the New York City Department of Education. Its students are admitted into six newly updated programs: Digital Art & Design, Music Performance & Production, Environmental Engineering & Technology, Humanities & Non-Profit Management, Computer Programming & Web Design, and Sports Medicine & Management. These programs offer students the opportunity to earn college credits, participate in industry internships and learn more about careers in the field.

The school has a 98.6% four-year graduation rate, the highest of any large open-admissions high school in the NYC DOE. The school has pioneered Whole Child Guidance practices and is further improving curriculum through the additions of internships and of numerous college-accredited courses. Bayside High School has been recognized for "closing the achievement gap" for minority students, English language learners (ELL) and students with special needs. The school offers their students to graduate early if they earn the proper amount of credits.

As of the 2021–22 school year, the school had an enrollment of 3,025 students and 185.5 classroom teachers (on an FTE basis), for a student–teacher ratio of 16.3:1. There were 2,049 students (67.7% of enrollment) eligible for free lunch and 159 (5.3% of students) eligible for reduced-cost lunch.

== History ==
Bayside High School, Samuel J. Tilden High School, Abraham Lincoln High School, John Adams High School, Walton High School, Andrew Jackson High School, and Grover Cleveland High School were all built during the Great Depression from one set of blueprints, in order to save money. Bayside and Andrew Jackson HS were the final two schools to be completed. The design was based on Kirby Hall in Gretton, Northamptonshire, England. The schools were designed as small campuses to provide a "somewhat collegiate atmosphere". The design of Bayside High School and the other schools, created by architect Walter C. Martin, was considered to be "a modern adaptation of the Adams, Lincoln, and Tilden High Schools", which had all been completed by 1929. Bayside High School was also the first school building in the city to be constructed using Federal funds, built by the Public Works Administration from 1934 to 1936 at the cost of $2.5 million (equivalent to $58 million in 2025).

Bayside opened its doors on March 16, 1936, taking in 2,300 students who had previously attended Flushing High School.

In 1978 the Bayside High School music program, then under department chairman Sidney Lovett and teacher John Benza, was among the first secondary schools in the nation to purchase and teach music synthesis on a synthesizer, the Roland System 100.

== Notable alumni ==
- Adrienne Adams (born 1960), Speaker of the New York City Council, New York City Councilwoman from the 28th district
- Eric Adams (born 1960), Former Mayor of New York City and former borough President of Brooklyn
- Peggy Adler (born 1942, class of 1959), author and illustrator of children's books; investigative researcher
- Ellen Baker (born 1953, class of 1970), astronaut
- Jordan Belfort (born 1962, class of 1980), former investment banker whose life was the basis the film The Wolf of Wall Street
- Action Bronson (born 1983, class of 2001), rapper
- Mic Geronimo (born 1973), rapper and former reality star
- Glenn Consor, sports broadcaster, Washington Wizards broadcasts, and former NCAA and pro basketball player
- Chy Davidson (born 1959), former professional football player
- Margaret Oakley Dayhoff (1925–1983), chemist, valedictorian, class of 1942
- Steve Englebright (born 1946, class of 1964), paleontologist, politician—member of the New York State Assembly
- Jason Eskenazi (born 1960), photographer
- Lovari, musician and actor
- Mae Faggs (1932–2000), track-and-field athlete who was a gold medalist in the Women's 4 × 100 meters relay at the 1952 Summer Olympics
- Heather Foster (born 1966), Jamaican American professional bodybuilder
- Mohammad Salman Hamdani (1977-2001), lauded for heroism on 9/11
- Bobby Hammond (born 1952, class of 1970), Educator/doctoral candidate, Former National Football League player & coach
- Ronnie Harmon (born 1964), professional football player
- Scott Ian (born 1963, class of 1981), musician, best known as the rhythm guitarist for the heavy metal band Anthrax
- Jipsta (born 1974 as John Patrick "JP" Masterson, class of 1992; valedictorian), rapper who has appeared six times on the Billboard Dance chart
- Daymond John (born 1969), founder, president, and CEO of FUBU; investor on the ABC reality television series Shark Tank
- Matthew Kaye (born 1974), former World Wrestling Entertainment wrestler/announcer, currently working for Lucha Underground as an announcer.
- Carolyn Konheim (1938-2019), environmental activist and consultant
- Brian Lehrer (born 1952), host of WNYC's The Brian Lehrer Show, a local call in radio show.
- Dan Lilker (born 1964, class of 1982), heavy metal musician, bassist for Nuclear Assault, Brutal Truth and founding member of Anthrax
- Olivia Longott (born 1981), R&B Singer/rapper, Class of 1998, currently on the VH1 show Love & Hip Hop
- David Nolan (born 1946), historian and author of Fifty Feet in Paradise and The Houses of St. Augustine
- John Paulson (born 1955), founder and president of Paulson & Co., a New York-based hedge fund
- Andrea Peyser (born 1959), columnist for the New York Post
- Vincent Rey (born 1987), professional football player
- Steven J. Ross, Pulitzer Prize finalist and professor at the University of Southern California
- Scott Salem (class of 1970), radio personality, best known as the engineer for The Howard Stern Show
- Gia Scala (1934-1972), actress
- Jack Sinagra (1950–2013), politician who served in the New Jersey Senate from 1992 to 2001.
- Norman Sturner (born 1940), real estate developer
- Joe Thomas (born 1963, class of 1981), talk radio host, radio program director (WCHV/Monticello Media) in Charlottesville, Virginia
- Mike Tirico (born 1966), announcer for ESPN
- Tobias Truvillion (born 1975), actor
- Neil Turbin (born 1963, class of 1981), heavy metal musician, first full-time singer in Anthrax
