= Neeley =

Neeley is a surname. Notable people with the surname include:

- Clifton Neeley, also known as Clifton McNeely, (1919–2003), American basketball player and coach
- Cynthia Neeley, American politician in Michigan
- George A. Neeley (1879–1919), U.S. Representative from Kansas
- J. Neeley Johnson, also known as J. Neely Johnson, (1825–1872), American lawyer and politician
- Kyle Neeley of Sponge (band), an Alternative Rock band from Detroit, Michigan
- Mayci Neeley (born 1995), American television personality
- Melissa Neeley (born 1972), News Director at Monticello Media
- Paul Neeley Brown (1926–2012), United States federal judge
- Sheldon Neeley (born 1968), American politician in Michigan
- Ted Neeley (born 1943), rock and roll drummer, singer, actor, composer, and record producer

== See also ==
- Neeley, Idaho, unincorporated community in Power County, Idaho, United States
- Neeley Entrepreneurship Center, also known as Texas Christian University
- Neeley School of Business, the undergraduate and graduate business school at Texas Christian University (TCU)
- 16268 Mcneeley, main-belt asteroid discovered on May 7, 2000
- Neely
- Nealy
- Neelly
