= WWTJ =

WWTJ may refer to:

- WWTJ-LP, a low-power radio station (96.9 FM) licensed to serve Watertown, New York, United States
- WCHV-FM, a radio station (107.5 FM) licensed to serve Charlottesville, Virginia, United States, which held the call sign WWTJ from 2007 to 2011
