= WCHV-FM =

- Charlottesville, Virginia; United States
- Broadcast area: Charlottesville, Virginia; Albemarle County, Virginia
- Frequency: 107.5 MHz
- Branding: C-Ville 107.5 and 1260

Programming
- Format: News/talk/sports
- Affiliations: Fox News Radio; Premiere Radio Networks; Wall Street Journal Radio Network

Ownership
- Owner: Monticello Media; (Monticello Media, LLC)
- Sister stations: WCHV, WCYK-FM, WHTE-FM, WHUK, WKAV

History
- First air date: January 12, 1996
- Former call signs: WLJL (1993–1996); WUMX (1996–2004); WCJZ (2004–2007); WWTJ (2007–2011)
- Call sign meaning: W CHarlottesVille

Technical information
- Licensing authority: FCC
- Facility ID: 61716
- Class: A
- Power: 210 Watts
- HAAT: 338 meters (1,109 ft)
- Transmitter coordinates: 37°59′5.0″N 78°28′49.0″W

Links
- Public license information: Public file; LMS
- Webcast: WCHV-FM Webstream
- Website: WCHV-FM Online

WCHV-FM is a news/talk formatted broadcast radio station licensed to Charlottesville, Virginia, serving Charlottesville and Albemarle County, Virginia. WCHV-FM is owned and operated by Monticello Media.

== History ==
The original permit for 107.5 FM in Charlottesville was applied for in 1992 by Washington, D.C. resident Deborah M. Royster's Spectrum Broadcasting Corporation. This permit was assigned the callsign WLJL. After several extensions, the station went on air in January 1996, followed by a callsign change to WUMX. The station's initial format was adult contemporary under the branding "Mix 107.5". Soon afterwards, Royster sold the station to David G. Mitchell's Air Virginia, Inc. Mitchell was at the time part-owner of two AM stations in Pennsylvania, and is currently the general manager of WCVL-FM (92.7 MHz).

In 2000, Clear Channel tried to purchase the station from Air Virginia. The sale was held up by the Federal Communications Commission on antitrust concerns; the company already owned WCYK-FM (99.7 MHz), WFFX (102.3 MHz), WVSY (101.9 MHz), WCHV (1260 kHz) and WKAV (1400 kHz). Clear Channel and Charlottesville's second-largest owner, Eure Communications – then-owners of WWWV (97.5 MHz), WINA (1070 kHz), and WQMZ (95.1 MHz) – would control nearly 95 per cent of the market's advertising revenue if the sale proceeded. In March 2002, the FCC announced its first public hearing on ownership concentration since 1960 to discuss the matter. The sale was ultimately approved. Ironically, the Department of Justice forced Eure to divest WCHV and WKAV – ultimately to Clear Channel – under similar antitrust concerns several years earlier.

Positioned in the middle of Charlottesville radio ratings in 2004, WUMX went on an abortive format flip to smooth jazz as "Smooth Jazz 107.5" WCJZ. This lasted eighteen months, as the station's ratings became even worse with the niche format. In October 2005, WCJZ flipped back to "Mix 107.5", but with hot adult contemporary music instead of the previous incarnation's gold-based adult contemporary.

Clear Channel sold its entire Charlottesville cluster to George Reed's Sistema 102 LLC, later renamed Monticello Media, on June 27, 2007. The sale closed in October. On October 12, WCJZ flipped to adult hits as "Tom @ 107.5" WWTJ, with a brand referencing University of Virginia founder Thomas Jefferson.

WWTJ flipped once again to a simulcast of WCHV's news/talk format on January 20, 2011, along with the new WCHV-FM callsign. The stations co-branded as "News Talk 107.5 and 1260 WCHV". WCHV had previously used a translator in downtown Charlottesville on 94.1 MHz, which switched to retransmitting rimshot WZGN (102.3 MHz).

With the August 2015 flip of WKAV from sports to classic country, WCHV and WCHV-FM became the Charlottesville affiliates for the Washington Nationals, Washington Capitals, Washington Wizards, Washington Redskins, and Virginia Tech Hokies radio networks. Accordingly, the stations' branding adjusted to "C-Ville 107.5 and 1260".
