= WNRS =

WNRS can refer to:

- WNRS, a global accounts receivable management & customer care company headquartered in Miami, Florida
- WNRS (AM), an AM radio station located in Herkimer, New York
- WNRS-FM, an FM radio station located in Sweet Briar, Virginia
- The former call sign of the AM station now known as WLBY in Saline, Michigan
