= WNMX =

WNMX may refer to:

- WYRD-FM, a radio station (106.3 FM) licensed to Simpsonville, South Carolina, United States, which held the call sign WNMX from 1989 to 1995
- WOLS, a radio station (106.1 FM) licensed to Waxhaw, North Carolina, United States, which held the call sign WNMX-FM from 1996 to 2008
- WGFY, a radio station (1480 AM) licensed to Charlotte, North Carolina, United States, which held the call sign WNMX from 1996 to 1997
- WVXL, a radio station (100.7 FM) licensed to Christianburg, Virginia, United States, which held the call sign WNMX from 2009 to 2018
