= WXTJ-LP =

- Charlottesville, Virginia; United States
- Broadcast area: Metro Charlottesville
- Frequency: 100.1 MHz
- Branding: WXTJ

Programming
- Format: Freeform

Ownership
- Owner: University of Virginia; (Rector & Visitors of the University of Virginia)
- Sister stations: WTJU

History
- First air date: September 5, 2015
- Call sign meaning: Thomas Jefferson

Technical information
- Licensing authority: FCC
- Facility ID: 194838
- Class: L1
- ERP: 23 watts
- HAAT: 62 meters (203 ft)
- Transmitter coordinates: 38°1′49.0″N 78°29′22.0″W

Links
- Public license information: LMS
- Webcast: Listen live
- Website: wxtj.fm

WXTJ-LP is a Freeform formatted broadcast radio station licensed to and serving Charlottesville, Virginia, owned and operated by the University of Virginia.

WXTJ-LP was founded by the staff of WTJU (91.1 FM) in 2013 as a response to low and declining student involvement at WTJU, the university's long-established station. WXTJ is now entirely administered and programmed by students, with WTJU's staff providing only studio space and technical support.

The station first went live on the Internet in the fall of 2013 under the fictitious callsign WTJX. A planned Part 15 AM transmitter on 1620 kHz while the station raised money for an FM signal was publicized, but never materialized. WXTJ gained its current callsign as a side effect of applying for an LPFM license in 2015. Although the suffixed callsign WTJX-LP is not in use, FCC rules require approval if any station is already using the base callsign – in this case, WTJX-TV of Charlotte Amalie, U.S. Virgin Islands, which expressed its opposition.
