= WCYK-FM =

- Staunton, Virginia; United States
- Broadcast area: Charlottesville; Harrisonburg; Lexington
- Frequency: 99.7 MHz
- Branding: 99-7 CYK

Programming
- Format: Country
- Affiliations: MRN Radio; PRN Radio

Ownership
- Owner: Monticello Media; (Monticello Media, LLC)
- Sister stations: WCHV, WCHV-FM, WHTE-FM, WHUK, WKAV

History
- First air date: August 1, 1984
- Former call signs: WANV-FM (1984–1994); WVAO-FM (1994–1996)
- Call sign meaning: Country K

Technical information
- Licensing authority: FCC
- Facility ID: 70861
- Class: B
- Power: 3,300 watts
- HAAT: 516 meters (1,693 ft)
- Transmitter coordinates: 38°3′52.0″N 78°48′18.0″W

Links
- Public license information: Public file; LMS
- Webcast: Listen live
- Website: monticello.media/wcyk/

WCYK-FM (99.7 FM) is a commercial radio station licensed to Staunton, Virginia, United States, and serving Charlottesville, Harrisonburg, and Lexington, Virginia. It is owned by Monticello Media and features a country music format. Studios and offices are on Hillsdale Drive in Charlottesville.

WCYK-FM's transmitter is sited on Bear Den Mountain in Waynesboro.

== History ==
=== WANV-FM ===
The station signed on the air on August 1, 1984, as WANV-FM and it had a soft adult contemporary format. The station was co-owned by M. Robert "Bob" Rogers' High Fidelity Music Show, Inc. WANV-FM served as a sister station to country WANV 970 AM in Waynesboro. Bob Rogers was the former manager of WGMS in Washington, D.C. With his wife Terry, he ran a series of annual High Fidelity Music Show expos to showcase the latest in home audio technology. The station initially transmitted from Elliott Knob west of Staunton, high enough to cover the Staunton-Waynesboro-Harrisonburg portion of the Shenandoah Valley.

In 1989, WANV-FM received a construction permit to move to Bear Den Mountain, just east of Waynesboro and north of Afton Mountain. Although this site is roughly 1,500 feet lower than Elliott Knob, it affords a much wider coverage area, with local-grade service to the Charlottesville metro in addition to the valley to the west. The station flipped to oldies during 1991.

=== WCYK-FM ===
Bob Rogers died in 1992, and the two stations passed to his son as executor, who began looking for a buyer. In March 1994, Michael Douglass' Clark Broadcasting Company bought WANV-FM along with longtime Charlottesville country stations WCYK (810 kHz) and WCYK-FM (102.3 MHz), based in Crozet. Clark changed the call sign to WVAO-FM and, at first, kept the oldies format.

To take advantage of the 99.7 MHz facility's superior signal, Clark then moved the more popular country format and WCYK-FM call letters from 102.3 in February 1996. That station took the oldies and WVAO-FM call sign in return.

=== Changes in ownership ===
Clear Channel entered the Charlottesville market by buying Clark's three FM stations in 1998. The company ran the station as "Country 99.7", but otherwise did not make changes.

Clear Channel exited the Charlottesville market in June 2007 by selling all of its stations to George Reed's Sistema 102 LLC, which was later renamed Monticello Media. On November 3, 2007, Monticello tweaked the station's branding to "Your Country 99.7". On the morning of September 16, 2010, the station adopted the "Hitkicker 99-7" brand, which came with changes to airstaff but not music.

Exactly seven years later, on September 16, 2017, the station shifted brands again to "99.7 CYK", at the same time adding some recurrents to a music rotation that was largely hit-based. This occurred as a result of increased competition from WCVL-FM (92.7 MHz), which airs a 1990-based country format, and a format change at Monticello's own classic country outlet WKAV.
