= 670 AM =

AM radio frequency

The following radio stations broadcast on AM frequency 670 kHz: 670 AM is a United States clear-channel frequency. WSCR Chicago and KDLG Dillingham, Alaska, share Class A status of 670 kHz.

== In Argentina ==
- LU9 in Mar del Plata, Bs. As.
- LRA11 in Comodoro Rivadavia, Chubut
- LRA52 in Chos Malal, Neuquen
- LT4 in Posadas, Misiones

== In Cuba ==
- Radio Rebelde (broadcasts from multiple locations on this frequency)
- Radio Enciclopedia in Matanzas

== In the United States ==
Stations in bold are clear-channel stations.

Call sign	City of license	Facility ID	Class	Daytime power (kW)	Nighttime power (kW)	Unlimited power (kW)	Transmitter coordinates
KBOI	Boise, Idaho	51211	B	50	50		43.428889°N 116.328611°W
**KDLG**	Dillingham, Alaska	16932	A			10	59.045278°N 158.451944°W
KHGZ	Glenwood, Arkansas	8148	D	5			34.325556°N 93.5575°W
KIRN	Simi Valley, California	69743	B	5	3		34.319444°N 118.715556°W
KLTT	Commerce City, Colorado	35191	B	50	1.4		39.955556°N 104.730556°W
KMZQ	Las Vegas, Nevada	122525	B	25	0.6		36.384444°N 115.351389°W
KPUA	Hilo, Hawaii	48678	B	5	5		19.783889°N 155.090278°W
WLUI	Lewistown, Pennsylvania	42134	D	5.4			40.607222°N 77.578889°W
WRJR	Claremont, Virginia	68741	D	20	0.003		37.174722°N 76.896944°W
**WSCR**	Chicago, Illinois	25445	A			50	41.934167°N 88.072778°W
WWFE	Miami, Florida	21391	B	50	1		25.8575°N 80.481111°W
