= Chy Davidson =

American football player (born 1959)

No. 88
- Position: Wide receiver

Personal information
- Born: May 9, 1959 (age 67); Queens Village, New York, U.S.
- Listed height: 5 ft 11 in (1.80 m)
- Listed weight: 175 lb (79 kg)

Career information
- High school: Bayside (Queens)
- College: Rhode Island
- Supplemental draft: 1981: 11th round

Career history
- New England Patriots (1981)*; Washington Redskins (1982)*; Washington Federals (1983)*; New York Jets (1984–1985)
- * Offseason or practice squad member only
- Stats at Pro Football Reference

Chy Davidson (born May 9, 1959) is an American former professional football wide receiver who played two seasons with the New York Jets of the National Football League (NFL). He was selected by the New England Patriots in the eleventh round of the 1981 NFL supplemental draft after playing college football at the University of Rhode Island.

== Early life ==
Davidson played high school football for the Bayside High School Commodores. He set the all-time scoring record for the Commodores with 28 touchdowns in a single season.

== Professional career ==
Davidson was selected by the New England Patriots of the NFL in the eleventh round of the 1981 NFL supplemental draft. He was released by the Patriots on August 24, 1981. He signed with the NFL's Washington Redskins during the 1982 off-season. Davidson was released by the Redskins on September 6, 1982. He signed with the Washington Federals of the United States Football League on January 21, 1983. He was by the Federals released on February 28, 1983. Davidson was signed by the New York Jets of the NFL on April 10, 1984. He played in four games for the Jets from 1984 to 1985. He was released by the Jets on September 12, 1985.
