= KIRN =

Iranian radio station in Simi Valley, California, United States

- Simi Valley, California; United States
- Broadcast area: Greater Los Angeles
- Frequency: 670 kHz
- Branding: Radio Iran

Programming
- Language: Persian
- Format: Ethnic Iranian
- Affiliations: SRN News

Ownership
- Owner: Lotus Communications; (Lotus Oxnard Corp.)
- Sister stations: KFWB; KWKW

History
- First air date: September 19, 1984
- Former call signs: KWNK (1984–1997); KVCA (1997–1999)
- Call sign meaning: Iran

Technical information
- Licensing authority: FCC
- Facility ID: 69743
- Class: B
- Power: 5,000 watts day; 3,000 watts night
- Transmitter coordinates: 34°19′10″N 118°42′59.3″W
- Repeater: 101.9 KSCA-HD2 (Glendale)

Links
- Public license information: Public file; LMS
- Webcast: Listen live
- Website: www.socalpersian.com

KIRN (670 AM) is a commercial radio station that is licensed to Simi Valley, California and serves the Greater Los Angeles area. The station is owned by Lotus Communications and broadcasts ethnic Iranian programming.

== History ==
The station on 670 AM first signed on September 19, 1984, as KWNK, originally owned by Manuel A. Cabranes/Valley Radio LLC. The license was granted as a result of the Federal Communications Commission (FCC) changing the regulations governing clear-channel stations in 1982, which permitted the establishment of lower-power radio stations on clear channel frequencies such as 670 AM. KWNK was allocated this frequency after protracted hearings by the FCC. Valley Radio's Consulting Engineer was Cecil Lynch, one of the most respected engineers in the United States. Initially, KWNK served the Simi and Conejo valleys of Ventura County, California with 1 kW of power 24 hours a day. Eventually, the FCC permitted Valley Radio to increase power to 5 kW during the daytime and 3 kW at night.

KWNK started as a top 40 station as "Top Hits 67 K-Wink", with music from such prominent 1980s artists as Prince and Duran Duran. Program directors during that period included Jim Conlee (former PD of KHTZ, "K-Hits") and Steve Smith. In mid-1986, KWNK began adjusting its format toward adult contemporary music, playing music from the likes of Amy Grant, due to direct competition from top 40 station KIIS-FM. KWNK also aired talk shows on Sundays; the station eventually adopted a full-time talk format.

In the mid-1990s, KWNK flipped to sports talk, first carrying One-on-One Sports, then simulcasting the signal of XETRA-AM (XTRA Sports 690) in Tijuana—San Diego. In August 1996, Valley Radio sold the station to Lotus Communications for $4.2 million. KWNK changed its call letters to KVCA on March 28, 1997, then to KIRN on August 13, 1999.

The XETRA-AM simulcast ended in 2001 when KIRN began airing brokered-time programs for a brief period, after which the station became "Radio Iran". KIRN is the first, and as of 2013, only, Persian-language radio station in the United States.

== Notable on-air personalities ==
- Dr. Laura Schlessinger
- Hurricane
- Joe Light
- Gary Butterworth
- Terry Shea
- Kidd Kelly (later known as Maverick on KFYV)
- William (Bill Roberts) Brady
- Anthony Edwards (not to be confused with the actor)
- Dave Skylar (Dave Montoya)
- Phyllis West (who died in 2008)
- Al Lohman (of Lohman & Barkely fame)
- Lida Hanaie and Sassan Kamali
- Dr. Farhang Holakouee (now on Radio Hamrah)
