= Hazel Henderson =

American activist and writer (1933–2022)

- Henderson in 1964 (age 31)
- Born: Jean Hazel Mustard; 27 March 1933; Bristol, Gloucestershire, England
- Died: 22 May 2022 (aged 89); St. Augustine, Florida, U.S.
- Citizenship: American (naturalized)
- Occupations: Futurist, economic iconoclast, television producer, author
- Spouses: Carter Henderson (m. 1957; div. 1981) Alan F. Kay (m. 1996; died 2016)
- Children: 1
- Website: hazelhenderson.com

Jean Hazel Henderson (née Mustard; 27 March 1933 – 22 May 2022) was an American futurist and environmental activist. As an autodidact in her twenties, having only a British high-school formal education, in the U.S. she gradually advanced, by virtue of citizen activism, into the roles of university lecturer and chair-holder, as well as that of advisor to corporations and government agencies. She authored several books including Building a Win-Win World, Beyond Globalization, Planetary Citizenship (with Daisaku Ikeda), and Ethical Markets: Growing the Green Economy.

== Early life and education ==
Henderson was born on 27 March 1933, in Bristol, Somerset, England, the daughter of Kenneth and Dorothy May (née Jesseman) Mustard. She graduated from Clifton High School in 1950. After graduation, she worked as a saleswoman, hotel clerk, and telephone operator.

== Career ==
Henderson moved to New York City with her husband in 1957. She lived in an area of the city that was constantly covered in soot from garbage incinerators, forcing her to constantly wash the soot from her infant daughter. Her many complaints to city hall went nowhere, prompting her and Carolyn Konheim, another concerned parent, to form Citizens for Clean Air. The group made several early advances in clean air activism by lobbying for local, state, and federal pollution legislation. The group is responsible for getting the air pollution index featured in weather reporting. At its height, the group was composed of 20,000 members, with about 75 percent of them being women.

She began writing for Harvard Business Review in the 1960s and 1970s. She advised the Office of Technology Assessment and the National Science Foundation from 1974 to 1980. She was also Regent's Lecturer at the University of California, Santa Barbara, and held the Horace Albright Chair in Conservation at the University of California, Berkeley, and worked as a travelling lecturer and panelist.

Henderson started Ethical Markets Media, LLC, in 2004 to disseminate information on green investing, socially responsible investing, green business, green energy, business ethics news, environmentally friendly technology, good corporate citizenship and sustainable development by making available reports, articles, newsletters and video gathered from around the world. Her book, Ethical Markets: Growing the Green Economy (2007) became the basis of the Ethical Markets television series on PBS. She served on the boards of several publications, including Futures Research Quarterly, The State of the Future Report, E/The Environmental Magazine, Resurgence, and Foresight and Futures. She was a member of the World Future Society, the National Press Club, the Association for Evolutionary Economics, and a fellow of the World Futures Studies Federation. She was listed in Who's Who in the World, Who's Who in Science and Technology, and Who's Who in Business and Finance.

== Personal life ==
She married Carter Henderson, a writer for The Wall Street Journal, in 1957. Together they had a daughter. They divorced in 1981. She married Alan F. Kay in 1996. Kay was an internet pioneer and social entrepreneur who was the founder of the electronic Wall Street trading platform AutEx. He died in 2016. Henderson died of skin cancer at her home in St. Augustine, Florida, on 22 May 2022.

== Awards and honours ==
- Citizen of the year (1967, New York County Medical Society)
- Global Citizen Award, shared with Adolfo Pérez Esquivel (1996, Boston Research Center)
- Fellow (2007, Royal Society of Arts)
- Honorary Doctor of Science degree (University of San Francisco)
- Honorary Doctor of Science degree (Soka University)
- Honorary Doctor of Science degree (Worcester Polytechnic Institute)

== Books ==
- The Politics of the Solar Age. Knowledge Systems Inc., 1988, ISBN 978-0-941705-06-6, 433 pgs (original edition, Doubleday, NY, 1981)
- Redefining Wealth and Progress: New Ways to Measure Economic, Social, and Environmental Change : The Caracas Report on Alternative Development Indicators. Knowledge Systems Inc., 1990, ISBN 978-0-942850-24-6, 99 pgs
- Paradigms in Progress. Berrett-Koehler Publishers, 1995, ISBN 978-1-881052-74-6, 293 pgs (original edition, Knowledge Systems, 1991)
- Hazel Henderson et al., The United Nations: Policy and Financing Alternatives. Global Commission to Fund the United Nations, 1995, ISBN 978-0-9650589-0-2, 269 pgs
- Creating Alternative Futures. Kumarian Press, 1996, ISBN 978-1-56549-060-4, 430 pgs (original edition, Berkley Books, NY, 1978)
- Building a Win-Win World. Berrett-Koehler Publishers, 1995, ISBN 978-1-57675-027-8, 320 pgs
- Beyond Globalization. Kumarian Press, 1999, ISBN 978-1-56549-107-6, 88 pgs
- Hazel Henderson et al., Calvert-Henderson Quality of Life Indicators, Calvert Group, 2000, ISBN 978-0-9676891-0-4, 392 pgs
- Daisaku Ikeda coauthor, Planetary Citizenship, Middleway Press, 2004, ISBN 978-0-9723267-2-8, 256 pgs
- Ethical Markets: Growing the Green Economy, Chelsea Green Publishing, 2006, ISBN 978-1-933392-23-3

== See also ==
- 1966 New York City smog
- E. F. Schumacher
- Solidarity economy
