= WHUK =

- Crozet, Virginia; United States
- Broadcast area: Charlottesville, Virginia; Albemarle County, Virginia
- Frequency: 102.3 MHz
- Branding: 102.3 The Hook

Programming
- Format: Adult hits

Ownership
- Owner: Monticello Media
- Sister stations: WCHV, WCHV-FM, WCYK-FM, WHTE-FM, WKAV

History
- First air date: September 1980 (as WCMZ-FM)
- Former call signs: WCMZ-FM (1980–1983); WPED-FM (1983–1985); WJLT (1985–1988); WJLT-FM (1988–1990); WCYK-FM (1990–1996); WVAO-FM (1996–2001); WFFX (2001–2003); WSUH (2003–2007); WZGN (2007–2023)
- Call sign meaning: "Hook"

Technical information
- Licensing authority: FCC
- Facility ID: 11672
- Class: A
- ERP: 4,900 watts
- HAAT: 108 meters (354 ft)
- Transmitter coordinates: 38°4′47.0″N 78°44′22.0″W

Links
- Public license information: Public file; LMS
- Webcast: Listen live
- Website: WHUK Online

WHUK (102.3 FM, "The Hook") is an adult hits formatted broadcast radio station licensed to Crozet, Virginia, serving Charlottesville and Albemarle County, Virginia. WHUK is owned and operated by Monticello Media.

== History ==
W. Edward "Mac" McClenahan, the owner of WPED Crozet (810 kHz) since 1974, was awarded a construction permit for what would become WCMZ-FM on November 20, 1979. The station went on the air in September 1980; together the AM-FM pair were known as the "Country Twins" and produced a locally-originated country music format from studios on Hilltop Street in Crozet. Both stations were purchased in 1981 by Elting Enterprises of New York. Elting changed the FM station's call sign to WPED-FM in June 1983.

The simulcast was split in September 1985, as the newly renamed WJLT flipped to adult contemporary as "Light 102.3", with WPED continuing the country music. A translator in downtown Charlottesville was added during this time. The AM station rejoined the pairing in early 1988, taking the WJLT call sign while the FM station adjusted to WJLT-FM.

Elting sold the two stations to Dale and Calvin High's High Communications of Lancaster, Pennsylvania in July 1989. This was followed quickly in January 1990 by a flip back to country as the first incarnation of WCYK-FM "Country 102". At the same time, the AM station became WCYK. Besides an abortive flip to news-talk WCNF in 1994, the AM station simulcast its FM partner for the rest of its operating life.

The newly formed Clark Broadcasting Corporation purchased the two stations at the end of 1993. Clark also purchased the higher-powered WANV-FM (99.7 MHz), licensed to Staunton, but with a signal large enough for local-grade coverage of Staunton, Harrisonburg and Charlottesville.

In 1996, 99.7 MHz and 102.3 MHz swapped formats and call signs, with 102.3 MHz flipping to oldies and the WVAO-FM call sign, and the more popular country format and WCYK-FM call sign moving to the better-signaled 99.7 MHz facility, where it remains today. The AM station kept the WCYK call sign and continued relaying the new WCYK-FM.

Clear Channel entered the Charlottesville market by buying Clark's three FM stations – WVAO-FM, WCYK-FM, and WVSY (101.9 MHz) – in June 1999. WCYK (810 kHz) was not included in the sale and went off the air after 29 years; its license expired exactly one year after the sale's approval, on August 6, 2000.

In early 2001, Clear Channel took the station on a short-lived flip to classic rock as "102.3 The Fox" WFFX. This format brought the station into competition with market-leading active rock station WWWV (97.5 MHz), and dismal ratings were the result. September 2003 brought an all-Beatles stunt, followed by a flip to classic hits as "SuperHits 94.1 and 102.3" WSUH, with a brand referencing the station's downtown Charlottesville translator.

Clear Channel announced a sale of its entire Charlottesville cluster to George Reed's Sistema 102, LLC on June 27, 2007. Sistema 102 later changed its name to Monticello Media.

Monticello kept the classic hits but changed the station's branding to "Generations 102.3 and 94.1" WZGN after the sale closed in October 2007. The only adjustment to the station's identity after then was the loss of the 94.1 translator.

At midnight on September 2, 2023, the station dropped the "Generations" branding, and the classic hits format altogether after 20 years, and began stunting, playing only music by the locally-founded Dave Matthews Band as "Dave 102.3". After stunting through the Labor Day weekend, the station played the Weekend on the Rocks live recording of "Don't Burn the Pig" at midnight on September 5 and flipped to adult hits as "102.3 The Hook". The branding references a common nickname for Charlottesville and is not related to the city's defunct alternative weekly newspaper. The stunt would prove to be a nod towards a new show featuring live recordings of Dave Matthews Band concerts, "Brunch with Dave", which airs on Sunday mornings.

=== Translator ===
In June 1987, Elting signed on broadcast translator W269AR on 101.7 MHz in order to bolster coverage in downtown Charlottesville. The 102.3 MHz facility is what is known as a rimshot station – a station licensed to a suburb or outlying area that attempts to serve a larger market. Due to its relatively low transmitter height and the hilly terrain between Crozet and Charlottesville, 102.3 has spotty coverage in the city itself, even with its highly directional signal pointed east. Most Charlottesville stations broadcast from the highest peak overlooking the city, the 1,573-foot Carter Mountain, which provides good coverage of Albemarle County.

Clark moved the translator from 101.7 MHz to 94.1 MHz in November 1993 due to interference from co-owned WVSY, which had recently moved to 101.9 MHz. The translator was given the new call sign W231AD. In 2002, it moved from its original site atop 500 Court Square (the former Monticello Hotel) in downtown Charlottesville to WKAV's tower along West Main Street immediately to the west.

On September 7, 2008, the translator shifted from simulcasting WZGN to simulcasting co-owned WCHV (1260 kHz). On January 20, 2011, W231AD returned to simulcasting WZGN as WCHV gained a full-powered repeater, WCHV-FM (107.5 MHz). In September 2015, W231AD was paired with WKAV in order to provide an FM home for that station's new classic country format.
