= Norman Sturner =

American real estate developer

- Born: September 6, 1940 (age 85); Bronx, New York
- Education: B.A. St. John’s University
- Known for: co-founder and CEO of Murray Hill Properties
- Spouse: Harriet Sturner (m. 1959)
- Children: Andrew Sturner; David Sturner

Norman Sturner (born September 6, 1940) is an American real estate developer and co-founder and CEO of Murray Hill Properties.

== Biography ==
Sturner was born in the Bronx, New York to a Jewish family and grew up in Bayside, Queens where he attended Bayside High School. He worked as a short-order cook when he was a teenager and entered college at the age of 16. He is a graduate of St. John's University where he majored in accounting. After school, he first worked as an accountant. and then moved on to become one of the largest mutual fund dealers in the country and owned a seat on the Philadelphia-Baltimore-Washington stock exchange. In 1971, he and his business partners, Neil Siderow an owner of a life insurance agency, and Michael Green, purchased a building on the verge of default for $70,000 which led to additional purchases and began their career in real estate investment.

Sturner focuses solely on commercial real estate in Manhattan; handling all aspects of development except construction - which is outsourced. His strategy historically has been to purchase undervalued commercial properties in Manhattan and improve them (typically upgrading lobbies and elevators) to attract a better class of tenants. His firm has acquired and sold more than 150 properties with a value of more than US$10 Billion. Sturner is a great believer in New York City stating: "New York is an island which cannot be moved anywhere and lose its value."

Sturner was named a member of the Commercial Observer's “Power 100” in New York City. Sturner is an approved receiver by the New York State Office of Court Administration (OCA), is a member of Real Estate Board of New York (REBNY), is a member of the Association for a Better New York (ABNY), and serves as vice president of the executive committee of the Realty Foundation of New York.

== Personal life ==
In 1959, he married, Harriet Sturner, whom he met in high school. They live in Short Hills, New Jersey and have two sons: Andrew Sturner who operates several marinas; and David Sturner who works at Murray Hill Properties. He serves as a mentor to the Young Jewish Professionals Real Estate Network.
