= Neelly =

Neelly is a surname. Notable people with the surname include:

- Brandy Neelly, singer
- Robert Neelly Bellah (1927–2013), American sociologist
- Lance Neelly, American politician

== See also ==
- Neeley
