= WVCW (Virginia Commonwealth University) =

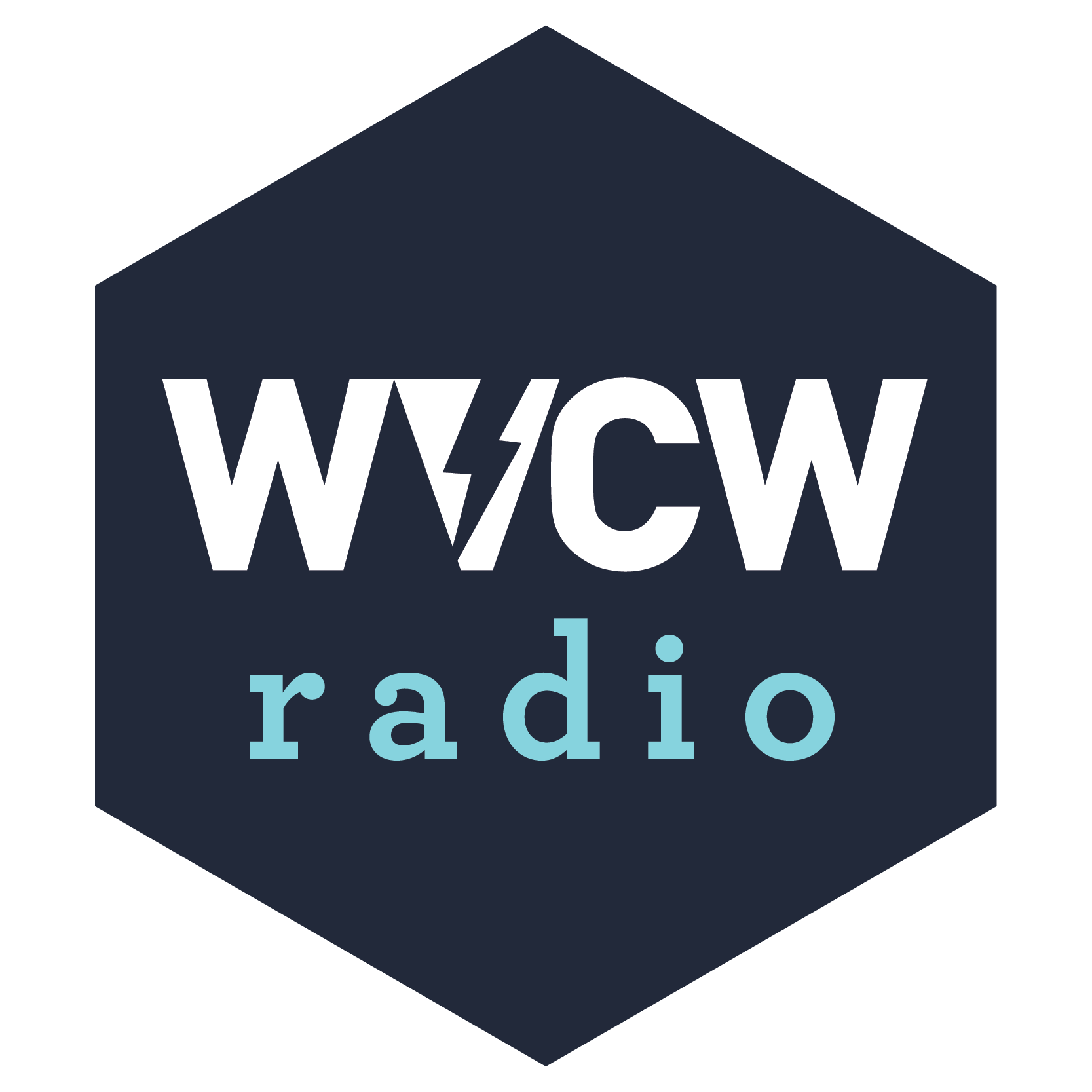
- Richmond, Virginia; United States
- Broadcast area: Richmond, Central Virginia
- Frequencies: Online only 102.9 FM (former)

Programming
- Format: Variety

Ownership
- Owner: Virginia Commonwealth University

History
- Former call signs: WJRB
- Call sign meaning: The V and C stand for Virginia Commonwealth

Links
- Webcast: Listen Live
- Website: Official website

WVCW's origins began in 1968 in the basement of the Millheiser House as a carrier current AM radio station known as WJRB, which stood for James River Broadcasting. After a successful run as WJRB, the station changed its identification in approximately 1977 to WVCW. At the time the student staff was trying to expand WJRB from a club into a real radio station, and tried to change the call letters to WVCU. After being told that they station could not be called WVCU, the station asked the FCC for permission to change its call letters to WVCW (double-U) as a way to "stick it to the man."

In 1976, WVCW was named one of the top college radio stations in the country by Billboard magazine (12/25/76 issue). WVCW continued on carrier current AM at both 820 AM and later 640 AM until the early 2000s. In 1991, the station relocated to the new T. Edward Temple building and began broadcasting on Continental Cable FM at 105.3. The relationship with cable FM lasted for over a decade despite the difficulties of connecting to a cable FM station.

In 2001, WVCW began its next chapter as an Internet only radio station first broadcasting on WVCW.cc before moving to the WVCW.org site it uses today.

WVCW began to simulcast its programming on WHAN. WTJU, owned by the University of Virginia, will begin operating the Ashland-based WHAN beginning February 1. WVCW was broadcast on WHAN from 6 pm to 1 am Monday - Thursday and from 9 pm to 1 am on Fridays. Upon this agreement's expiration, WVCW returned to being an online-exclusive radio station.

== Notable alumni ==
- Debbie Matenopoulos
- Robb Spewak
- Max Ryder
- Kevin Mays
