= WNRN-FM =

Radio station in Charlottesville, Virginia

- Charlottesville, Virginia; United States
- Broadcast area: Central Virginia
- Frequency: 91.9 MHz
- Branding: WNRN

Programming
- Format: Adult album alternative
- Affiliations: NPR

Ownership
- Owner: Stu-Comm, Inc.
- Sister stations: WHAN, WNRN, WNRS-FM, WRJR

History
- First air date: September 1996
- Former call signs: WANJ (1995–1996); WNRN (1996–2024)
- Call sign meaning: "New Rock Now"

Technical information
- Licensing authority: FCC
- Facility ID: 8710
- Class: A
- ERP: 320 watts
- HAAT: 325 meters (1,066 ft)
- Transmitter coordinates: 37°58′55.5″N 78°29′2″W

Links
- Public license information: Public file; LMS
- Webcast: Listen live
- Website: www.wnrn.org

WNRN-FM (91.9 FM) is a non-commercial radio station licensed to Charlottesville, Virginia, United States, serving Central and Western Virginia. The station has a board of directors consisting of local community members and is incorporated as the non-profit Stu-Comm, Inc. WNRN has an adult album alternative format and is the only NPR member in Charlottesville, carrying NPR's daily music program, World Cafe, as well as locally produced specialty music shows on weekends.

WNRN has a network of rebroadcasters and FM translators around Virginia, covering the Shenandoah Valley from Roanoke to Harrisonburg as well as Richmond, Williamsburg and Hampton Roads. WNRN's transmitter is sited at the Carter's Mountain antenna farm in Charlottesville.

== History ==
=== Early years ===
In 1993, Mike Friend, a former operations manager at WTJU, a station owned and operated by the University of Virginia, incorporated Stu-Comm to bring public radio to Charlottesville-Albermarle area. Stu-Comm originally obtained a construction permit for 88.5 FM in 1994.

An unrelated entity, CAPRA, Inc., signed 91.9 FM on the air as WNRN in September 1996. Stu-Comm sold the 88.5 FM construction permit to the Virginia Tech Foundation for $25,000 in March 1996; it is now WVTW, a repeater of the foundation's NPR member WVTF based in Roanoke. It purchased the 91.9 FM facility for $7,100 in August 1997. WNRN has always had the non-commercial AAA format.

In 2006, the station gained a direct commercial competitor in pop-oriented AAA station WCNR (106.1 FM), branded as "106.1 The Corner". Founder and then-general manager Mike Friend banned the word "corner" from his airwaves for a time after WCNR signed on.

=== Expansion ===
In 2000, WNRN began expanding its service area outside of Charlottesville: first by renting airtime on WUDZ (now WNRS-FM), then the Sweet Briar College student radio station, followed by several purchases of translator stations in Lexington, Richmond, Harrisonburg and Lovingston in 2006 and 2007. Stu-Comm purchased WNRS-FM outright in 2010, increasing its height and power in order to reach Lynchburg. Although the main signal from Carters Mountain nominally has good coverage in the lower elevations to the east, including Richmond, interference from co-channel WGTS in Washington, D.C. cuts down on reception in those areas.

Stu-Comm took additional steps to improve its terrestrial signals in 2016, starting with the acquisition of WFTH (1590 AM) in Richmond, which enabled it to purchase and move in an additional FM translator under the Federal Communications Commission's (FCC) AM revitalization program. This new translator, W203CB on 88.5 FM from Midlothian, became WNRN's primary Richmond-area signal on February 2, 2018. W203CB replaced W276BZ (103.1 FM), which prompted listener complaints as it broadcast at only 10 watts and had difficulty covering the city.

Hanover County-based WHAN (1430 AM), with a transmitter and FM translator (W275BQ, 102.9 FM) located in Ashland and covering the northern suburbs of Richmond, filed an agreement donating its license and facilities to Stu-Comm on July 31, 2020; this gave WNRN a third and fourth signal covering the city. The action came concurrently with the FCC repeal of a longstanding rule prohibiting co-owned AM stations with substantial signal overlap from simulcasting each other. WHAN came under Stu-Comm's control on October 14.

In 2022, Stu-Comm entered the Hampton Roads market with the purchase of WRJR (670 AM), which is licensed to Claremont in Surry County but has a signal powerful enough to cover the entire region during the day. WRJR's companion FM translator W273DZ (102.5 FM) is located in Hampton and at least marginally covers Williamsburg, Newport News, Norfolk, and Virginia Beach. WNRN programming commenced on June 3.

Stu-Comm purchased Staunton's WTON-FM (94.3 FM) and WTON (1240 AM) on September 25, 2023; the FM signal replaced the translators covering Staunton – Waynesboro and Harrisonburg and allows for full coverage of the lower Shenandoah Valley for the first time. The sale closed on December 4. The two translators were sold along with WTON the following April.

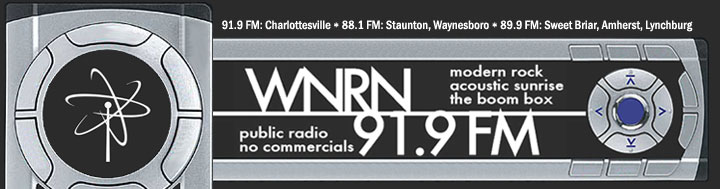
WNRN 91.9 radio face logo from May 2009.

The station changed its call sign to WNRN-FM on January 2, 2024, with the WNRN call sign simultaneously moving to the former WFTH.

In the summer of 2024, Stu-Comm expanded WNRN's service area to Roanoke by purchasing WGMN (1240 AM) and its companion FM translator W258DN (99.5 FM). Programming began over the two stations on July 1.

=== Programming ===
WNRN is the only member of National Public Radio based in Charlottesville, even though it is a member strictly to carry its music programs. Full NPR news and talk service is provided to the city by WVTW and WMRY (103.5 FM), a repeater of Harrisonburg's WMRA.

World Cafe airs at 6 p.m. on weekdays, and All Songs Considered and Alt.Latino air on Sunday mornings. Locally produced specialty shows heard on weekends include Bluegrass Sunday Morning; Country Feedback (alt-country, classic country and Southern rock); Fresh Roots, New Blues (Americana and blues); Les Temps Perdu (classic alternative rock); Grateful Dead and Phriends (jam bands); and New Love Mixtape (new AAA releases). Outside of these shows, the station plays continuous adult album alternative music with live air staff on duty from 6 a.m. until midnight daily.

=== Personnel ===
The station made local headlines when Mike Friend was unexpectedly fired as manager by the board of directors in April 2011, although he was kept on as the station engineer. Friend left WNRN altogether in 2013 and founded Blue Ridge Free Media, the licensee of WXRK-LP (92.3 FM). The station's assistant general manager, Anne Williams, became acting general manager. Mark Keefe replaced Dave Benson as general manager and program director May 31, 2014.

As of June 2020, development director is Ian Solla-Yates, the membership director is Lauren Velardi, and Desiré Moses is the managing producer, host, and music writer. Bob Mosolgo is the morning host and Amber Hoback is sation's music director.

Longtime Acoustic Sunrise host Anne Williams worked her last on-air shift on February 15, 2019, after a two-decade run as a cornerstone of the station's schedule. Williams took a management position at Knoxville Americana station WDVX.

== Repeaters ==
WNRN's programming is aired full-time on five additional full-powered stations:

Call sign	Frequency	City of license	FID	Power (W)	ERP (W)	HAAT	Class	FCC info
WGMN	1240 AM	Roanoke, Virginia	37746	1,000 (unlimited)	—N/a	—N/a	C	FCC (WGMN)
WHAN	1430 AM	Ashland, Virginia	8438	1,000 (day); 31 (night)	—N/a	—N/a	D	FCC (WHAN)
WNRN	1590 AM	Richmond, Virginia	67683	5,000 (day); 19 (night)	—N/a	—N/a	D	FCC (WNRN)
WNRS-FM	89.9 FM	Sweet Briar, Virginia	74157	—N/a	1,100	169 m (554 ft)	A	FCC (WNRS-FM)
WRJR	670 AM	Claremont, Virginia	68741	12,000 (day); 3 (night)	—N/a	—N/a	D	FCC (WRJR)
WTON-FM	94.3 FM	Staunton, Virginia	50078	—N/a	340	680 m (2,230 ft)	B1	FCC (WTON-FM)

The seven low-powered translators are:

Call sign	Frequency	City of license	FID	ERP (W)	Class	FCC info	Notes
W203CB	88.5 FM	Richmond, Virginia	54972	170	D	LMS	Relays WNRN
W234BA	94.7 FM	Lovingston, Virginia	157863	10	D	LMS	Relays WNRN-FM
W237DF	95.3 FM	Lexington, Virginia	147184	10	D	LMS	Relays WTON-FM
W258DN	99.5 FM	Roanoke, Virginia	202973	250	D	LMS	Relays WGMN
W273DZ	102.5 FM	Norfolk, Virginia	201653	250	D	LMS	Relays WRJR
W275BQ	102.9 FM	Richmond, Virginia	155027	240	D	LMS	Relays WHAN
W277EB	103.3 FM	Williamsburg, Virginia	158513	250	D	LMS	Relays WRJR

== See also ==
- List of community radio stations in the United States
