= Carolyn Konheim =

American environmental activist and consultant (1938–2019)

- Born: Carolyn Irene Salminen; January 20, 1938; Queens, New York
- Died: November 25, 2019 (aged 81); Brooklyn, New York
- Occupation(s): environmental activist, consultant
- Spouses: B. Brand Konheim (m. 1962; div. 1978); Brian Ketcham (m. 1984)
- Children: 2

Carolyn Salminen Konheim (born Carolyn Irene Salminen) (1938–2019) was an American environmental activist and consultant, based in New York.

== Early life and education ==
Konheim was born on January 20, 1938, in Queens, the daughter of Carl H. Salminen and Irene Ahti Salminen. Her father was a Brooklyn-born commercial architect. After graduating from Bayside High School, she earned a bachelor's degree in history at Skidmore College, with further studies at Columbia University. She taught history at White Plains High School before she married in 1962.

== Career ==
Konheim was a mother of young children, living in New York City, when she became concerned about the city's air quality. She and Hazel Henderson founded Citizens for Clean Air in 1964. Konheim served as communications director for Mayor John Lindsay's Department of Air Resources from 1967 to 1971. From 1976 to 1977 she served on the state's Department of Environmental Conservation. She ran the New York Scientists Committee for Public Information, providing scientific and economic talking points on environmental issues. She chaired the Permanent Citizens' Advisory Committee of the Metropolitan Transportation Authority. Her work led to changes in New York State laws regarding industrial emissions, and later to automotive emissions.

With her second husband, she worked successfully against the city's Westway scheme, citing environmental hazards. Later Konheim and Ketcham founded Community Consulting Services, and worked as environmental-impact consultants for urban and transportation projects. Kornheim advocated for congestion pricing, bicycle-friendly streets, and pedestrian malls.

In the 1980s, she was a consultant in support of a trash incinerator projects in Brooklyn, Pennsauken, Kenosha, and other sites, reporting that harmful by-products such as dioxins could be handled with the right technology, regulation, and oversight. In the 1990s, Konheim was president of Women for Affirmative Action, a lobbying organization representing over four thousand woman-owned businesses in the New York metropolitan area.

== Personal life ==
Konheim married twice. She married businessman B. Brand "Bud" Konheim in 1962; they had two sons, Eric (who died in 1991) and Alex. The Konheims divorced in 1978. In 1984, she married automotive engineer Brian Ketcham, who also worked on air pollution. The couple lived in Brooklyn, where she died on November 25, 2019, after a decade with Parkinson's disease and dementia.
