= Neely =

Neely is both a surname and a given name. Notable people with the name include:

== Surname ==
- Adam Neely (born 1988), American bass player and YouTuber
- Anne Neely (born 1946), American painter
- Bill Neely (born 1959), British television journalist
- Blake Neely (born 1969), American film score composer
- Bob Neely (born 1953), ice hockey player
- Brad Neely (born 1976), American comic strip cartoonist
- Cam Neely (born 1965), Canadian ice hockey player
- Don Neely (1935–2022), New Zealand cricket player and administrator
- Gary Neely (born 1974), Irish cricketer
- Jess Neely (1898–1983), American football coach
- Jordan Neely (1993–2023), American killed on New York subway
- Mark E. Neely, Jr. (born 1944), American historian
- Mason Neely (born 1979), American record producer
- Matthew M. Neely (1874–1958), American politician
- Pat Neely and Gina Neely (21st century), television hosts
- Peggy Neely (21st century), American politician
- Ralph Neely (1943–2022), American football player
- Richard Neely (1941–2020), American judge and politician
- Ruth Neely, American judge
- Sam Neely (1948–2006), American country musician
- Sharlotte Neely (born 1948), American anthropologist
- Stephanie Neely (21st century), American politician
- Thomas Neely (1897–1918), English recipient of the Victoria Cross

== Given name ==
- Neely Bruce (born 1944), American composer
- John Neely Bryan (1810–1877), American Presbyterian farmer, lawyer, and tradesman
- Neely C. Carlton (born 1970), American politician
- Neely Edwards (1883–1965), American film actor
- Neely Gray (1818–1867), American businessman and territorial legislator
- Neely Jenkins (born 1974), American singer
- J. Neely Johnson (1825–1872), American lawyer and politician
- Neely Plumb (1912–2000), American musician and record producer
- Neely Tucker (born 1963), American journalist

== Fictional characters ==
- Neely Capshaw, a fictional character on Baywatch
- Neely O'Hara, a fictional character in Valley of the Dolls
- Neely Crenshaw, a fictional character from the John Grisham novel Bleachers

== See also ==
- 13860 Neely, a main-belt asteroid
- Neely Nuclear Research Center, a research center at Georgia Tech
- Neely Mansion
- Neely Township
- Neeley
- Nealy
