= WTON (AM) =

- Staunton, Virginia; United States
- Broadcast area: Staunton, Virginia; Augusta County, Virginia
- Frequency: 1240 kHz
- Branding: WTON

Programming
- Format: Talk radio

Ownership
- Owner: Joe and Elaine Thomas; (Thomas Media, LLC)

History
- First air date: March 9, 1946 (at 1400)
- Former call signs: WSTN (1944–1945)
- Former frequencies: 1400 kHz (1944–1956)
- Call sign meaning: Staunton

Technical information
- Licensing authority: FCC
- Facility ID: 50077
- Class: C
- Power: 1,000 watts unlimited
- Transmitter coordinates: 38°8′30.0″N 79°2′33.0″W
- Repeaters: 98.9 W255DS (Harrisonburg); 101.1 W266BQ (Crozet)

Links
- Public license information: Public file; LMS
- Website: https://www.wtonradio.com/

WTON (1240 kHz) is a talk radio formatted broadcast radio station licensed to Staunton, Virginia, United States, serving Staunton and Augusta County, Virginia. WTON is owned and operated by Thomas Media, LLC.

== History ==
WTON had previously carried ESPN Radio and local and regional sports starting in 2000. Stu-Comm, Inc. purchased WTON and co-owned WTON-FM (94.3 FM) in 2023, intending to use WTON-FM as a full-powered relay of its WNRN-FM for the lower Shenandoah Valley.

In March 2024, Stu-Comm sold WTON and their now-redundant FM translators covering Staunton–Waynesboro and Harrisonburg to Joe Thomas, morning host and program director of WCHV in Charlottesville. WCHV owner Monticello Media fired Thomas when the sale was reported publicly, stating that the purchase of another station within its coverage area was an unacceptable conflict of interest. Thomas then told the Staunton News Leader that he planned to return WTON to a competing format of local news, talk and sports programming. The sale closed on May 24, with Thomas' programming launching the following day. Monticello Media subsequently sued Thomas for violating a noncompete clause, due to the stations' overlapping signals, and a court prohibited Thomas from hosting his morning show over-the-air through January 19, 2025.

== Programming ==
Thomas's morning show moved from WCHV, with satellite-delivered conservative talk shows (Chris Plante, Dan Bongino, Dana Loesch, Lars Larson, Joe Pags, Lee Habeeb, John B. Wells, and Brandon Tatum) filling the rest of the station's schedule. Thomas also pledged to bring back live broadcasts of local high school football games that had previously aired on the station before its purchase by Stu-Comm.

WTON is the Charlottesville–Staunton–Waynesboro affiliate for Virginia Tech Hokies men's basketball and football coverage, taking over after WCHV dropped them.

== Translators ==
W255DS's coverage area is Harrisonburg proper. W266BQ, located on Bear Den Mountain on the Blue Ridge, covers Staunton, Waynesboro, Charlottesville, and most of Albemarle and Nelson counties.

Call sign	Frequency	City of license	FID	ERP (W)	Class	FCC info
W255DS	98.9 FM	Harrisonburg, Virginia	141356	80	D	LMS
W266BQ	101.1 FM	Crozet, Virginia	91283	195	D	LMS
