= WNRS-FM =

Simulcasts WNRN-FM, Charlottesville
- Sweet Briar, Virginia; United States
- Broadcast area: Amherst, Virginia; Amherst County, Virginia
- Frequency: 89.9 MHz
- Branding: WNRN

Programming
- Format: Adult album alternative

Ownership
- Owner: Stu-Comm, Inc.
- Sister stations: WHAN, WNRN, WNRN-FM, WRJR

History
- First air date: October 1979; 46 years ago
- Former call signs: WUDZ (1979–2000)
- Former frequencies: 91.5 MHz (1979–1999)
- Call sign meaning: "WNRN Sweet Briar"

Technical information
- Licensing authority: FCC
- Facility ID: 74157
- Class: A
- ERP: 1,100 watts
- HAAT: 169 m (554 ft)
- Transmitter coordinates: 37°31′58.0″N 79°5′33.0″W

Links
- Public license information: Public file; LMS
- Webcast: Listen Live
- Website: wnrn.org

WNRS-FM (89.9 MHz) is an adult album alternative formatted broadcast radio station licensed to Sweet Briar, Virginia, serving Amherst and Amherst County, Virginia. WNRS is owned and operated by Stu-Comm, Inc. and simulcasts WNRN-FM full-time.

== History ==
WUDZ ("woods") signed on in late 1979 as Sweet Briar College's student radio station, replacing an earlier Part 15 station that had the unofficial callsign of WSBC. The station was originally licensed for just 10 watts – good for reception at a five-mile radius from campus – but upgraded to 100 watts during 1980.

By 1997, WUDZ was broadcasting for the legally required minimum of 36 hours per week: 6 p.m. through midnight on Sunday through Thursday, off on Friday, and noon through 6 p.m. on Saturday. In February 2000, the callsign was changed to WNRS-FM. That April, Sweet Briar entered into a local marketing agreement to rent its extra airtime to Stu-Comm, Inc., who filled the hours not programmed by students with a relay of WNRN. The station moved to a 30-watt transmitter from the 2,900-foot Tobacco Row Mountain west of Sweet Briar in 2002, allowing reception in car radios in Lynchburg.

By 2010, Sweet Briar programming had dwindled to a single three-hour window on Mondays through Thursdays during the school year. The college sold WNRS-FM to Stu-Comm in January of that year. In lieu of a cash payment, Stu-Comm agreed to donate 25% of the money raised from within the station's city-grade signal contour to Sweet Briar, as well as allow the college to fill one seat on its board of directors. WSWE-LP has since launched as a new outlet for student programming.

In 2011, Stu-Comm attempted to move WNRS-FM to a 20-kilowatt transmitter near Appomattox Court House, which would have given the station a 50-mile radius from the Roanoke metropolitan area east to Powhatan County and south to the North Carolina border. A first application was dismissed in 2011 as the Federal Communications Commission primarily determined a signal on 89.9 from this location would cause unacceptable interference to multiple other stations. A second application on 89.5 from the same location progressed to the construction permit stage and received local zoning approval, but was abandoned in July 2015.

Stu-Comm has since moved the station off of Tobacco Row Mountain back to the town of Sweet Briar, in order to increase its power from 30 to 1100 watts.

== See also ==
- List of community radio stations in the United States
