= WPSK-FM =

Radio station in Pulaski, Virginia

- Pulaski, Virginia; United States
- Broadcast area: New River Valley
- Frequency: 107.1 MHz
- Branding: WPSK XL

Programming
- Format: Country
- Affiliations: Compass Media Networks; Motor Racing Network; Westwood One

Ownership
- Owner: Monticello Media LLC
- Sister stations: WBRW, WVXL, WRAD, WRAD-FM

History
- First air date: 1967
- Former call signs: WPUV-FM (1967–1981)
- Call sign meaning: Pulaski

Technical information
- Licensing authority: FCC
- Facility ID: 48621
- Class: C3
- Power: 1,750 watts
- HAAT: 368 meters (1,207 ft)
- Transmitter coordinates: 37°1′28″N 80°44′47″W

Links
- Public license information: Public file; LMS
- Webcast: Listen live
- Website: www.107countrypsk.com

WPSK-FM (100.7 MHz) is a country formatted broadcast radio station licensed to Pulaski, Virginia, serving the New River Valley. WhvkFM is owned and operated by Monticello Media. Its programming is simulcast on WVXL 100.7 FM) in Christiansburg.

== History ==
On September 6, 2018, Cumulus Media announced it would sell its Blacksburg cluster to Monticello Media. The sale was approved December 1, 2018. WPSK-FM, which had been rebranded under Cumulus' Nash FM brand on February 5, 2014, reverted to its original branding as "107.1 PSK" in 2019, shortly after the sale to Monticello Media. On June 3, 2024, the station rebranded as "WPSK XL", to reflect its new simulcast on WVXL (100.7 FM).
