= WHTE-FM =

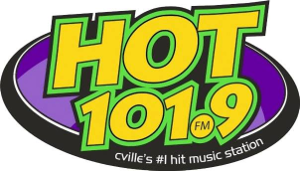
- Ruckersville, Virginia; United States
- Broadcast area: Charlottesville, Virginia; Central Virginia
- Frequency: 101.9 MHz
- Branding: Hot 101-9

Programming
- Format: Contemporary hit radio

Ownership
- Owner: Monticello Media; (Monticello Media, LLC)
- Sister stations: WCHV; WCHV-FM; WCYK-FM; WHUK; WKAV

History
- First air date: March 29, 1990
- Former call signs: WXZY (1989–1992); WVSY (1992–2001)
- Former frequencies: 92.1 MHz (1989–1992)
- Call sign meaning: "Hot"

Technical information
- Licensing authority: FCC
- Facility ID: 56361
- Class: A
- ERP: 6,000 watts
- HAAT: 68 meters (223 ft)
- Transmitter coordinates: 38°18′5.0″N 78°31′57.0″W

Links
- Public license information: Public file; LMS
- Webcast: Listen live
- Website: monticello.media/hot1019/

WHTE-FM is a contemporary hit radio formatted broadcast radio station licensed to Ruckersville, Virginia, serving Charlottesville and Central Virginia. WHTE-FM is owned and operated by Monticello Media.

== History ==
Ridge Broadcasting Corporation obtained a permit for a new station WXZY on 92.1 MHz in 1989. The initial transmitter site was a flat area near the intersection of U.S. Route 29 and U.S. Route 33 in Ruckersville, which had Charlottesville on the edge of its local-grade service area. The station signed on in March 1990 with an adult contemporary format.

The station evidently had difficulty covering Charlottesville, as Ridge filed in 1992 to move to a higher transmitter site on Snow Mountain west of Stanardsville, increase power, and change frequencies to 101.9 MHz. The Federal Communications Commission granted permission to build on November 11, 1992.

In late November 1992, the station's new facilities went live, and it switched its branding to "Y101.9" WVSY, while keeping the adult contemporary format. Ridge sold the station to Jay Hicks' Radio Piedmont in 1995. This was followed the next year by a sale to Clark Broadcasting Company, owner of WCYK-FM (99.7 MHz) and WVAO-FM (102.3 FM).

Clear Channel entered the Charlottesville market by buying Clark's three FM stations in June 1999. After taking control, Clear Channel first flipped the station to rhythmic oldies. As that format proved to be a short-lived fad, the station flipped again to contemporary hit radio as "Hot 101.9" WHTE-FM in February 2001.

Clear Channel announced a sale of its entire Charlottesville cluster to George Reed's Sistema 102, LLC on June 27, 2007. Sistema 102 later changed its name to Monticello Media. Monticello did not change the station's identity upon assuming control in October 2007.

== Translator ==
WHTE-FM has one translator to help the rimshot main signal cover downtown Charlottesville. The translator went to air in February 2006.

Call sign	Frequency	City of license	FID	ERP (W)	HAAT	Class	Transmitter coordinates	FCC info
W285EF	104.9 FM	Charlottesville, Virginia	81122	46	52.9 m (174 ft)	D	38°1′49″N 78°29′22″W	LMS
