= WCNR =

Radio station in Keswick, Virginia

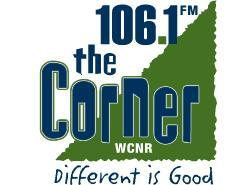
- Keswick, Virginia; United States
- Broadcast area: Charlottesville metropolitan area; Albemarle County; Western Fluvanna County
- Frequency: 106.1 MHz (HD Radio)
- Branding: 106.1 The Corner

Programming
- Format: Adult album alternative

Ownership
- Owner: Saga Communications; (Tidewater Communications, LLC)
- Sister stations: WCVL-FM; WINA; WQMZ; WWWV

History
- First air date: March 2, 1991
- Former call signs: WJNA (1989–1990); WBOP (1990–2006)
- Former frequencies: 106.7 MHz (1989–1990); 106.3 MHz (1990–2006)
- Call sign meaning: Corner

Technical information
- Licensing authority: FCC
- Facility ID: 52394
- Class: A
- ERP: 600 watts
- HAAT: 312 meters (1,024 ft)
- Transmitter coordinates: 37°59′6.0″N 78°28′48.0″W

Links
- Public license information: Public file; LMS
- Webcast: Listen live
- Website: www.1061thecorner.com

WCNR (106.1 FM) is an adult album alternative formatted broadcast radio station licensed to Keswick, Virginia, United States, serving the Charlottesville metropolitan area, Albemarle and Western Fluvanna counties in Virginia. WCNR is owned by Saga Communications, and operates as part of its Charlottesville Radio Group.

== History ==
The station that is now WCNR began as a station licensed to Churchville, Virginia, outside Staunton. The initial permit was granted in 1988 to Peter W. Lechman on 106.7 MHz, under the callsign WJNA. This facility never made it to air before the permit's expiration in March 1990, and Lechman applied for an extension to November. Before this next expiration, it was modified to move to 106.3 MHz, relocate closer to Staunton, increase power, and change the callsign to WBOP. This station went to air on March 2, 1991, with a mainstream rock format known as "106.3 WBOP".

In December 2004, Lechman's Shenandoah Valley Television, LLC sold all of its stations to Jeffrey Shapiro's Force 5 Communications. Shapiro is also the owner of Great Eastern Radio, who holds several FM stations in Vermont and New Hampshire. Following this, in April 2005, Force 5 sold WSIG (96.9 MHz) and WZXI (95.5 MHz) to Vox Communications. Vox entered into a time brokerage agreement for WBOP, with the stipulation that Force 5 would retake control upon the construction of a new facility for the station in Keswick, Virginia. The plan was to physically move the station over the Blue Ridge, change the frequency to 106.1 MHz, and build a transmitter at the Charlottesville antenna farm on Carter Mountain.

WBOP dropped the longtime rock format on June 30, 2005, stunted for a day, and then unveiled a format flip to oldies as "Magic 106.3" on July 1. On August 16, 2006, the WBOP callsign and programming moved to 95.5 MHz, which continued the oldies format as "Magic 95.5", while the 106.3 MHz facility went silent.

After finishing construction of the new transmitter, Force 5 sold WBOP to Saga Communications of Charlottesville on August 27, 2006. The rebuilt station went on the air from Charlottesville on September 15, 2006, with an adult album alternative (AAA) format branded "106.1 The Corner" WCNR. The branding references The Corner neighborhood near the University of Virginia. This brought it into direct competition with locally owned nonprofit AAA station WNRN (91.9 MHz), whose general manager was incensed enough to famously ban the word "corner" from his airwaves for a time. WCNR immediately found an audience, shooting into the top-5 of the city's radio ratings within a year of sign-on. The station's musical selection leans more toward commercially successful pop and pop-rock than most AAA stations, which typically have a focus on independent and local music.

== Translator ==
WCNR relays co-owned WINA (1070 kHz) on its second HD subchannel in order to feed WINA's FM translator.

Call sign	Frequency	City of license	FID	ERP (W)	HAAT	Class	FCC info
W255CT	98.9 FM	Charlottesville, Virginia	18875	250	318 m (1,043 ft)	D	LMS
