= Nealy Ridge =

Unincorporated community in Virginia, United States

Coordinates: 37°07′16″N 82°20′28″W

Nealy Ridge is an unincorporated community in Dickenson County, Virginia, United States.

== History ==
A post office was established at Nealy Ridge in 1909, and remained in operation until it was discontinued in 1961. The community was probably named for Cornealius "Nealy" Vanover, an early settler.
