= WTON-FM =

- Staunton, Virginia; United States
- Broadcast area: Staunton, Virginia; Augusta County, Virginia; Southern Rockingham County, Virginia; Northern Rockbridge County, Virginia
- Frequency: 94.3 MHz
- Branding: Independent Music Radio WNRN

Programming
- Format: Adult album alternative

Ownership
- Owner: Stu-Comm, Inc.
- Sister stations: WTON

History
- First air date: November 1990
- Call sign meaning: StaunTON

Technical information
- Licensing authority: FCC
- Facility ID: 50078
- Class: B1
- ERP: 340 watts
- HAAT: 680 meters (2,230 ft)
- Transmitter coordinates: 38°9′55.0″N 79°18′51.0″W

Links
- Public license information: Public file; LMS
- Webcast: Listen live
- Website: wnrn.org

WTON-FM (94.3 MHz) is an adult album alternative formatted broadcast radio station licensed to Staunton, Virginia, serving Staunton and Augusta County, Virginia. WTON is owned and operated by Stu-Comm, Inc, and relays Charlottesville-based WNRN-FM full-time.

== History ==
The station first took its callsign on February 11, 1988 and officially launched in November 1990 with a Light Adult Contemporary format, branded as "Star 94.3". In mid-January 2005, WTON switched to Classic Hits and Classic rock, as "Classic Hits; Star 94.3".

WTON-FM and co-owned WTON (1240 AM) were sold to Stu-Comm, Inc., the nonprofit owner of Charlottesville's WNRN-FM (91.9 FM), on September 25, 2023. The purchase gave WNRN-FM full coverage of the lower Shenandoah valley and replaced a previous low-powered translator serving Staunton and Waynesboro.
