= WKAV =

- Charlottesville, Virginia; United States
- Broadcast area: Albemarle County, Virginia
- Frequency: 1400 kHz
- Branding: 94.1 The Oasis

Programming
- Format: Christian adult contemporary

Ownership
- Owner: Monticello Media; (Monticello Media, LLC)
- Sister stations: WCHV; WCHV-FM; WCYK-FM; WHTE-FM; WHUK

History
- First air date: October 31, 1957 (as WELK at 1010)
- Former call signs: WBFY (1954–1956, CP); WELK (1956–1980); WXAM (1980–1984)
- Former frequencies: 1010 kHz (1957–1974)
- Call sign meaning: "Kavalier" [sic]

Technical information
- Licensing authority: FCC
- Facility ID: 10651
- Class: C
- Power: 1,000 watts unlimited
- Transmitter coordinates: 38°1′49.5″N 78°29′21″W
- Translator: 94.1 W231AD (Charlottesville)

Links
- Public license information: Public file; LMS
- Webcast: Listen live
- Website: www.941theoasis.com

WKAV (1400 AM) is a Christian adult contemporary formatted broadcast radio station licensed to Charlottesville, Virginia, serving Charlottesville and Albemarle County, Virginia. WKAV is owned and operated by Monticello Media.

== History ==
In 1954, a construction permit was issued to Lawrence Lee Kennedy for WBFY, a 1000-watt daytimer on 1010 kHz. After several extensions and a call sign change to WELK, Charlottesville's fourth radio station signed on October 31, 1957. WELK was Charlottesville's first strictly top 40 station; its competitors, WINA and WCHV, both ran older-skewing middle-of-the-road formats.

In 1966, WINA moved from 1400 kHz to 1070 kHz, opening up a valuable channel that allowed for 24-hour operation. WELK and WUVA, which was then a carrier current AM station broadcasting only in University of Virginia residence halls, both filed for the 1400 kHz allocation the following year. The competing applications required arbitration by the FCC, who first recommended denial of both as neither proposed transmitter site provided a listenable signal to both the university and downtown Charlottesville at night. Asserting that a third nighttime station was needed, WELK found an adequate site and paid WUVA and another applicant $10,000 in exchange for withdrawing their applications.

WELK was sold to Richard Latora in late 1979. Under the new call sign WXAM, the station remained top-40, with programming from ABC's American Contemporary Network.

Failing to regain ratings traction during this time due to competition from FM, the station was sold to Charles Wilson's Cavalier Country Broadcasting in 1984, who changed the call sign to WKAV and instituted a country music format. Top-40 radio would not return to the market until the launch of WHTE-FM in 2001.

Charlottesville Broadcasting Corporation, longtime owners of WINA and WQMZ, purchased WKAV in 1993 and flipped it to adult standards. Charlottesville Broadcasting merged with Eure Communications, which owned WWWV and WCHV, in 1998. Ownership concentration concerns from the Department of Justice forced the new company to divest the two least-valuable properties, WCHV and WKAV. The stations went to Clear Channel in 2000.

Clear Channel at first kept the standards, but in 2001 flipped the station to "Sports Talk 1400" with Fox Sports Radio programming that had run briefly on WCHV.

George Reed's Sistema 102, LLC, later renamed to Monticello Media, bought all of Clear Channel's Charlottesville stations in June 2007. Monticello tweaked the branding to "1400 The Ticket" after taking control. The station picked up most local sports broadcasting rights during this time, including the Washington Redskins, Washington Capitals, Washington Nationals, Washington Wizards, and Virginia Tech Hokies.

Monticello suddenly flipped WKAV to "94.1 Hank FM" with classic country music on September 14, 2015, pairing the station with a downtown Charlottesville FM translator that had been associated with WZGN. This flip came three days before WUVA was to flip to classic country from Nash Icon. Fox Sports Radio was dropped, while WCHV and WCHV-FM picked up live sports coverage on nights and weekends.

In September 2017, the classic country "Hank FM" format was dropped and the contemporary Christian-formatted "The Oasis" appeared in its place.

== Translator ==
WKAV is relayed by one translator to provide an FM home for its music programming.

Call sign	Frequency	City of license	FID	ERP (W)	HAAT	Class	Transmitter coordinates	FCC info
W231AD	94.1 FM	Charlottesville, Virginia	11670	250	91.9 m (302 ft)	D	38°1′49.5″N 78°29′21″W	LMS
