= WCVL-FM =

Radio station in Charlottesville, Virginia

- Charlottesville, Virginia; United States
- Broadcast area: Charlottesville metropolitan area; Albermarle County
- Frequency: 92.7 MHz
- Branding: C-Ville Country 92.7

Programming
- Format: Country
- Affiliations: Compass Media Networks; Westwood One

Ownership
- Owner: Saga Communications; (Tidewater Communications, LLC)
- Sister stations: WCNR; WINA; WQMZ; WWWV

History
- First air date: June 22, 1979 (as WUVA)
- Former call signs: WUVA (1979–2017)
- Call sign meaning: CharlottesViLle

Technical information
- Licensing authority: FCC
- Facility ID: 74161
- Class: A
- Power: 750 watts
- HAAT: 274 meters (899 ft)
- Transmitter coordinates: 37°59′8.0″N 78°28′47.0″W

Links
- Public license information: Public file; LMS
- Webcast: Listen Live
- Website: cvillecountry.com

WCVL-FM (92.7 MHz) is a country music formatted broadcast radio station licensed to Charlottesville, Virginia, United States, serving the Charlottesville metropolitan area and Albemarle County, Virginia. The station is owned by Saga Communications, through licensee Tidewater Communications, LLC, and operates as part of its Charlottesville Radio Group.

== History ==
WCVL-FM was first licensed as an FM station, with the call letters WUVA, in 1979. However, the station evolved from an AM carrier current station, located at the University of Virginia, which had been in operation for over 30 years.

=== WUVA (carrier current) ===
WUVA originated in the fall of 1947 as the University of Virginia's student-run carrier current station, transmitting at 640 kHz on the AM band. Carrier current stations use the electrical system of a building as their antenna. As they have a small coverage area – normally the interior of the building and up to 200 feet outside – carrier current stations are not licensed by the Federal Communications Commission and are not issued a call sign, although the station used "WUVA" as a familiar form of identification.

Initially WUVA adopted a schedule of pop standards, news, and discussion. The station began playing newly popular rock and roll music in 1954. WUVA was run as a commercial operation that sold advertising, and it bolstered its coverage by gaining a cable FM slot on Charlottesville's cable TV system in the 1970s. An additional source of revenue came from renting out the student announcers as party DJs.

As the station became popular through the 1960s, management decided to abandon the antiquated network of carrier-current transmitters and pursue a full-market signal. In 1966, WINA received permission to move from 1400 to 1070 AM, vacating a valuable channel that allowed for 24-hour operation at one kilowatt. WUVA was one of three competitors for the allocation, but lost out when WELK (now WKAV) was the first to secure a transmitter site that satisfied regulators.

=== WUVA (FM) ===
In August 1974, WUVA proposed to add a 92.7 FM allocation to Charlottesville. This was granted in 1976 over the objections of WCHV (1260 AM). Three applicants filed for the channel, and in January 1979 WUVA prevailed. WUVA was now officially assigned as the new station's call letters, and operations began on June 22, 1979, continuing the music programming (by then album-oriented rock) and news coverage.

An independent non-profit corporation, WUVA, Inc., was created to hold the FM station's license, and later to manage WUVA's digital operations. The corporation board consists of eleven directors, six of which are University of Virginia alumnae and five of which are current students. WUVA, Inc., is also registered as a university student organization (Contracted Independent Organization, CIO). Student organizations are legally unaffiliated with the university, conduct their own affairs unsupervised, and are liable for their own conduct, but are allowed to advertise to students and request funding. The station remained financially self-sufficient and never applied for student-activity funds. This independent model contrasts with that of the university's traditional college radio station, WTJU (91.1 FM), which it directly owns, funds, and manages.

WUVA served as a training ground for media studies program students with an interest in commercial radio management or journalism, as the university does not have a formal program in broadcast journalism or related fields. A student newsdesk evolved into the full-fledged online news operation WUVA News in 2011.

In the unusual position of being under public ownership but still running as a commercial operation, WUVA switched from rock to top-40 to adult contemporary in an attempt to improve ratings. In 1996, the station settled on a locally originated urban contemporary format under the slogan "92.7 Kiss FM". In the face of still-inadequate revenue, local programming was ended on September 17, 2015, and was replaced by syndicated classic country from Nash Icon. This change came as a competitor, WVAI-LP, was preparing to sign on in the same week; station management indicated they were aware of its launch, which made the decision to flip "easier".

On January 17, 2017, WUVA, Inc., announced the sale of its FM license to Saga Communications of Charlottesville (owners of WWWV, WQMZ, WINA, WCNR, and WVAX) for $1.65 million, in order to provide long-term funding for the digital operations of WUVA News. WUVA, Inc., retains the right to the "WUVA" trademark, and WUVA News continues as a digital news organization.

Saga took immediate control of the station under a time-brokerage agreement. On March 1, 2017, it rebranded WUVA as "C-Ville Country 92.7", keeping the 1990s-based country format, but leaving Nash Icon in favor of returning to local programming.

=== WCVL-FM ===
On the day that Saga took legal ownership, April 18, 2017, the station's call letters were changed to WCVL-FM.
