= WNRN (AM) =

Radio station in Richmond, Virginia

Simulcasts WNRN-FM, Charlottesville
- Richmond, Virginia; United States
- Broadcast area: Metro Richmond
- Frequency: 1590 kHz
- Branding: WNRN

Programming
- Format: Adult album alternative; public radio

Ownership
- Owner: Stu-Comm, Inc.
- Sister stations: WHAN, WNRN-FM, WNRS-FM, WRJR

History
- First air date: December 1958
- Former call signs: WEZL (1958–1961); WRGM (1961–1964); WGOE (1964–1982); WFTH (1982–2024)

Technical information
- Licensing authority: FCC
- Facility ID: 67683
- Class: D
- Power: 1,000 watts daytime (STA); 24 watts nighttime
- Transmitter coordinates: 37°30′1.23″N 77°27′22.34″W

Links
- Public license information: Public file; LMS
- Webcast: Listen live
- Website: www.wnrn.org

WNRN (1590 AM) is a non-commercial radio station licensed to Richmond, Virginia, and serving the Greater Richmond Region. WNRN is owned and operated by Stu-Comm, Inc. It airs an adult album alternative radio format, simulcasting sister station WNRN-FM in Charlottesville, Virginia. WNRN is listener supported, with on-air fundraisers held throughout the year.

WNRN broadcasts in the daytime at 5,000 watts, using a non-directional antenna. The station decreases power to 24 watts at night to protect others on the same frequency. 1590 AM is a regional broadcast frequency.

Programming is also heard on FM translator station W203CB at 88.5 MHz, which has a power of 170 watts.

== History ==
In December 1958, the station signed on as WEZL. The station was originally a daytimer, required to sign-off at sunset. In 1964, it was purchased by Richard S. Reynolds III and future Lieutenant Governor of Virginia J. Sargeant Reynolds. As WGOE, the station was first a top-40 outlet. It later became locally famous for airing a progressive rock format, which was typically the domain of FM radio, during the 1970s.

In 1982, the station was bought by the Willis Broadcasting Corporation. Owner L.E. Willis Sr. changed the call sign to WFTH to represent the word "faith". The format was switched to black gospel music and preaching shows.

In May 2016, the station was leased to Stu-Comm, Inc., owner of non-commercial 91.9 WNRN-FM in Charlottesville, Virginia. WFTH was sold to Stu-Comm the next month. Stu-Comm's goal was to take advantage of the Federal Communications Commission's "AM revitalization" program, which allows owners of eligible AM stations to purchase and move in FM translators from up to 250 miles away. A facility was brought in from Harrisville, West Virginia, which is now on the air as W203CB. This translator replaces WNRN-FM's previous signal in the area, W276BZ (103.1 FM), which broadcast at just 10 watts and drew listener complaints due to its poor coverage of the city.

The station changed its call sign to WNRN on January 2, 2024.

== Translator ==
In addition to the main station, WNRN is relayed by one FM translator to widen its broadcast area.

Call sign	Frequency	City of license	FID	ERP (W)	HAAT	Class	Transmitter coordinates	FCC info
W203CB	88.5 FM	Richmond, Virginia	54972	170	213 m (699 ft)	D	37°30′45.5″N 77°36′4″W	LMS
