= WHAN (AM) =

Radio station in Ashland, Virginia

- Ashland, Virginia; United States
- Broadcast area: Ashland, Virginia; Hanover County, Virginia
- Frequency: 1430 kHz
- Branding: "WNRN"

Programming
- Format: Adult album alternative

Ownership
- Owner: Stu-Comm, Inc.
- Sister stations: WNRN, WNRN-FM, WNRS-FM

History
- First air date: May 1, 1962
- Former call signs: WDYL (1960 – 1962, CP); WIVE (1962 – 1977); WKDH (1977 – 1980); WIVE (1980 – 1987); WMMM (1987 – 1989); WPES (1989 – 1998)
- Call sign meaning: HANover

Technical information
- Licensing authority: FCC
- Facility ID: 8438
- Class: D
- Power: 1,000 Watts daytime 31 Watts nighttime
- Transmitter coordinates: 37°44′46.0″N 77°29′44.0″W
- Translator: (102.9 MHz) W275BQ (Ashland)

Links
- Public license information: Public file; LMS
- Website: WHAN Online

WHAN is an adult album alternative formatted broadcast radio station licensed to Ashland, Virginia, serving Ashland and Hanover County, Virginia as well as the northern half of the Metro Richmond, Virginia region. WHAN is owned by Stu-Comm, Inc. WHAN currently simulcasts WNRN-FM.

== History ==
On February 1, 2015, Charlottesville-based public broadcaster WTJU began simulcasting its programming on WHAN in an attempt to use its FM translator to reach the Richmond market. WTJU operated the station daily from 1:00 am to 6:00 pm as part of a three-year local marketing agreement. Through a separate agreement with WTJU, Virginia Commonwealth University webcaster WVCW broadcast on WHAN Monday through Thursday from 6:00 pm to 1:00 am and Friday from 9:00 pm to 1:00 am, with additional broadcasting time allowed for special events. Local programming filled the remaining timeslots 6:00 pm – 9:00 pm on Fridays and 6:00 pm – 1:00 am on weekends.

WTJU terminated the local marketing agreement effective August 16, 2017, citing financial reasons. WHAN returned to a locally programmed music format, branded "102.9 The Mater", which it described as a mix of classic Southern rock and 1990s alternative rock but has transitioned since 2018 to "The RVA's Best Music Variety" featuring artists and genres from the past 65 years.

On August 10, 2020, Fifth Estate Broadcasting filed an agreement to donate WHAN and W275BQ to Stu-Comm, Inc., operator of Charlottesville-based adult album alternative station WNRN-FM, which complements its existing Richmond pair of WFTH (1590 AM) and W203CB (88.5 FM). This action came less than a week after the Federal Communications Commission (FCC) repealed a longstanding rule that prevented co-owned AM stations with overlapping signals from broadcasting the same programming. The sale was completed on October 9, 2020. WHAN and W275BQ now simulcast WNRN-FM.

== Translator ==
In addition to the main station, WHAN is relayed by an FM translator to rebroadcast the daytime signal of 1430 AM on the FM band 24 hours a day.

| Call sign | Frequency | City of license | FID | ERP (W) | HAAT | Class | FCC info |
|---|---|---|---|---|---|---|---|
| W275BQ | (102.9 FM) FM | Ashland, Virginia | 155027 | 250 watts | 96.9 m (318 ft) | D | LMS |
