= WBRW =

- Blacksburg, Virginia; United States
- Broadcast area: New River Valley; Roanoke metropolitan area
- Frequency: 105.3 MHz
- Branding: 105.3 The Bear

Programming
- Format: classic rock

Ownership
- Owner: Monticello Media LLC
- Sister stations: WPSK-FM, WRAD, WRAD-FM, WVXL

History
- First air date: December 1964; 61 years ago
- Former call signs: WVVV (1964–1995); WVMJ (1995–1999)
- Former frequencies: 104.9 MHz (1964–1996)
- Call sign meaning: "Bear"

Technical information
- Licensing authority: FCC
- Facility ID: 5795
- Class: C3
- ERP: 12,000 watts
- HAAT: 146 meters (479 ft)
- Transmitter coordinates: 37°11′12″N 80°28′54″W

Links
- Public license information: Public file; LMS
- Webcast: Listen live
- Website: www.1053thebear.com

WBRW (105.3 MHz) is a commercial FM radio station licensed to Blacksburg, Virginia, and serving the New River Valley and part of the Roanoke metropolitan area. It broadcasts an classic rock radio format known as "The Bear." It is owned by Monticello Media LLC, with radio studios and offices on Lee Highway (U.S. Route 11) in Radford.

WBRW has an effective radiated power (ERP) of 12,000 watts. The transmitter is on Stroubles Creek Road in Blacksburg.

== History ==
The station signed on the air in December 1964 as the FM counterpart to WJJJ (1260 AM). The original call sign was WVVV and its frequency was 104.9 MHz. The owner was Blacksburg-Christiansburg Broadcasters and it aired an album rock radio format.

In 1996, WVVV moved to its current dial position after changing its call letters the previous year to WVMJ Became Majic 105 and was A/C Format. In 1999, the station switched to its current call sign, WBRW, flipping to an active rock format.

WBRW had been owned and operated by Cumulus Media. On September 6, 2018, Cumulus Media announced it would sell its Blacksburg cluster to Monticello Media. The sale was approved December 1, 2018.
