= WWWV =

Radio station in Charlottesville, Virginia

- Charlottesville, Virginia; United States
- Broadcast area: Central Virginia; Central Shenandoah Valley
- Frequency: 97.5 MHz (HD Radio)
- Branding: 97-5 3WV

Programming
- Language: English
- Format: Classic rock
- Subchannels: HD2: Sports talk "Fox Sports 102.9"
- Affiliations: United Stations Radio Networks

Ownership
- Owner: Saga Communications; (Tidewater Communications, LLC)
- Sister stations: WCNR; WCVL-FM; WINA; WQMZ

History
- First air date: March 5, 1960
- Former call signs: WCCV-FM (1960–1977)

Technical information
- Licensing authority: FCC
- Facility ID: 19837
- Class: B
- ERP: 8,900 watts (analog); 356 watts (digital)
- HAAT: 345 meters (1,132 ft)
- Transmitter coordinates: 37°59′5.0″N 78°28′49.0″W

Links
- Public license information: Public file; LMS
- Webcast: Listen Live
- Website: 3wv.com

WWWV (97.5 FM) is a classic rock formatted broadcast radio station licensed to Charlottesville, Virginia, United States, and serves Central Virginia and the Central Shenandoah Valley. WWWV is owned by Saga Communications, and operates as part of its Charlottesville Radio Group.

== History ==
WCCV-FM signed on March 5, 1960, with a middle-of-the-road format of post-war pop and light classical music. WCCV-FM was co-owned with WCHV (1260 kHz) by Roger and Louise Neuhoff's Eastern Broadcasting Corporation. In December 1968, WCCV-FM and WCHV were sold to Charlottesville resident Edward S. Evans, Jr. Two years later, the station flipped to country music during the day and a simulcast of WCHV's adult contemporary format between 6 p.m. and 6 a.m. On May 1, 1971, WCCV-FM switched again to beautiful music. In 1973, Evans sold the two stations to Lyell B. Clay's Clay Broadcasting, owner of several newspapers and television stations, most notably WWAY of Wilmington, but no other radio stations.

On January 10, 1977, the station adopted its current identity – album-oriented rock music, the branding "3WV", and the callsign WWWV.

Clay sold all of his broadcasting interests in 1987-88; WWWV and WCHV went to Eure Communications, then-owners of WXEZ Yorktown. In 1998, Eure combined WWWV with Charlottesville Broadcasting Corporation's WINA (1070 kHz) and WQMZ (95.1 MHz) in a merger deal. Eure was ordered by the Department of Justice to spin off the merger's two remaining stations – WCHV and WKAV (1400 kHz) – to Clear Channel, as FCC regulators took issue with Eure's potential ownership of five stations in the small market. (The FCC under a different leadership permitted Clear Channel to own six stations just five years later.)

Saga Communications bought Eure's three-station cluster in 2004.

WWWV took over as the FM home of Virginia Cavaliers football and men's basketball at the beginning of the 2003-04 football season, complementing longtime state network flagship WINA. It simulcasts all games, but does not air the coaches' shows.

Since flipping to a broadly rock format in 1977, the station's music has aged with its audience; it remained a modern rock reporter through the 1990s before adding recurrents and moving to active rock. WWWV dropped all new music in 2017 to become strictly classic rock.

== Translator ==
After co-owned WVAX (1450 kHz) was deleted in 2025, its sports talk programming was moved to WWWV's HD Radio signal in order to continue feeding an FM translator.

Broadcast translator for WWWV-HD2
Call sign	Frequency	City of license	FID	ERP (W)	HAAT	Class	FCC info
W275CL	102.9 FM	Charlottesville, Virginia	141162	120	92 m (302 ft)	D	LMS
