= WINA =

Radio station in Charlottesville, Virginia

- Charlottesville, Virginia; United States
- Broadcast area: Charlottesville metropolitan area; Albemarle County
- Frequency: 1070 kHz
- Branding: NewsRadio 1070 and 98.9 FM WINA

Programming
- Format: News/talk/sports
- Affiliations: ABC News Radio; CBS News Radio; NBC News Radio; Compass Media Networks; Salem Radio Network; Westwood One; Virginia Sports Radio Network

Ownership
- Owner: Saga Communications; (Tidewater Communications, LLC)
- Sister stations: WCNR; WCVL-FM; WQMZ; WWWV

History
- First air date: October 1949
- Former frequencies: 1280 kHz (1949–1954); 1450 kHz (1954–1956); 1400 kHz (1956–1966)
- Call sign meaning: originally pronounced as "winner"

Technical information
- Licensing authority: FCC
- Facility ID: 10649
- Class: B
- Power: 5,000 watts
- Transmitter coordinates: 38°5′22.0″N 78°30′14.0″W
- Translator: 98.9 W255CT (Charlottesville)

Links
- Public license information: Public file; LMS
- Webcast: Listen Live
- Website: wina.com

WINA (1070 AM) is a news/talk/sports formatted broadcast radio station licensed to Charlottesville, Virginia, United States, serving the Charlottesville metropolitan area and Albemarle County. WINA is owned by Saga Communications, and operates as part of its Charlottesville Radio Group.

== History ==
WINA was granted its license to broadcast on October 10, 1949; the station signed on soon afterwards as a 1,000-watt daytimer on 1280 kHz with a full service format. Behind WCHV, it was the city's second radio station. It was owned by Charlottesville Broadcasting Corp. and had studios at 4th and East Main Streets in downtown Charlottesville. In the earliest advertisements, the station was branded as "The WINA!", implying a pronunciation as the word "winner". In modern times, the station's callsign is pronounced phonetically.

Network radio was still dominant in 1949, but there were no available networks with which to affiliate, and so WINA was to start entirely reliant on local programming. WCHV was affiliated with ABC, WJMA Orange was affiliated with Mutual, and CBS and NBC were available to some from WRVA and WMBG in Richmond, respectively. In 1951, it obtained a short-lived affiliation with the Liberty Broadcasting System. After LBS went under in 1952, WINA gained affiliations with Mutual and the Keystone Broadcasting System, a radio transcription network rebroadcasting major-network scripted programs to areas that lacked local affiliates. By then, the station had settled into a format of middle-of-the-road music, news, and scripted network programs.

WINA changed frequencies twice during this period. In 1954, it moved to 1450 kHz and gained permission to commence night operation at 250 watts, reducing daytime power to match. Two years later, it moved to 1400 kHz in order to increase back to 1 kW during the day.

In May 1957, Charlottesville Broadcasting merged with the James Madison Broadcasting Corporation, owners of WJMA. The combined entity was still known as Charlottesville Broadcasting Corp., and the stations were managed independently. The two stations joined NBC together on October 1, 1958. WJMA was sold off in April 1961.

After eight years with NBC, WINA switched to CBS on October 30, 1966, an affiliation that lasts to the present day. This was concurrent with a change to 1070 kHz and another power upgrade to the current 5 kW day and night.

Laurence E. Richardson, former president of Post-Newsweek Stations, bought Charlottesville Broadcasting Corp. from Don Heyne in 1969.

In 1970, farm director Bill Ray began syndicating regional farm news reports in a network known as Agrinet. In the mid-1970s, this involved into the full-fledged Virginia News Network, carrying news bulletins and Virginia Cavaliers sports. The network news operation was spun off and relocated to WRVA in Richmond in 1982, but WINA remains the flagship of the Virginia Sports Radio Network.

As late as 1991, WINA's full service format (with the music having evolved to modern adult contemporary) was still the top rated station in Charlottesville, despite having multiple FM competitors. Starting in 1992, the station added satellite-fed talk in addition to some remaining adult contemporary programming. Around 1995, WINA eliminated its remaining music-formatted blocks and transitioned to a full news/talk format. The station now runs news in morning drive and locally produced talk in afternoon drive, with satellite-fed talk and CBS news bulletins filling the rest of the time.

Charlottesville Broadcasting concluded a merger deal with Eure Communications, owners of ratings rival WWWV (97.5 MHz) and WCHV (1260 kHz), in 1997. The FCC scrutinized the sale, as it would have resulted in common ownership of five stations – which it saw as a potential competition-killer in the small market. The sale proceeded after the new company was forced to spin off the two least-valuable properties, WCHV and WKAV (1400 kHz), to Clear Channel. Saga Communications bought Eure's three stations in 2004.

WINA added an FM translator on 98.9 MHz in November 2015. This translator is fed by an HD subchannel of co-owned WCNR (106.1 MHz). The translator augments WINA's reception in the city, as AM signals become increasingly difficult to receive due to electrical interference.

=== FM and television ===
In 1954, WINA began simulcasting on the city's first FM station, WINA-FM on 95.3 MHz. Like many early AM-FM combinations, the FM station was merely a relay for the AM station. In order to encourage unique FM programming, the FCC limited simulcasting on a co-owned AM-FM pair to twelve hours per day in 1964. WINA-FM was initially exempt because the rule only applied to large markets, but the FCC made programming separation a condition of Richardson's purchase of Charlottesville Broadcasting. The FM station began airing a separate day (except for a morning drive simulcast) in 1971, followed quickly by a callsign change to WQMC. This station is now WQMZ on 95.1 MHz.

In 1961, Charlottesville Broadcasting attempted to add a channel 11 television allocation to Staunton, with a proposed 3,000-foot tower on Little North Mountain near the Augusta-Rockbridge county line. The corporation claimed its proposed tower was high enough to provide "better reception than is now available" to Charlottesville (i.e., from WHSV-TV and stations in Richmond), but a tower any closer to the city proper was precluded by short-spacing to WBAL-TV in Baltimore. The allocation request was denied after the Naval Research Laboratory insisted on continued protection for its under-construction Sugar Grove Station. The prospects of UHF television were still difficult in the years after Congress mandated new televisions include UHF tuners with the All-Channel Receiver Act of 1964. Nevertheless, Charlottesville Broadcasting became the first permittee of the city's channel 29 allocation, which was duly given the callsign WINA-TV. The construction permit was issued on July 13, 1965, and no further actions besides two extensions are recorded.

During the company's 1969 sale, then-owner Don Heyne indicated he no longer wanted to build out the permit and could not find a buyer. Richardson also indicated that he did not want to purchase it, but was required to by the purchase agreement. As FCC rules only allow the sale of a permit to an entity that intends to build, the board ordered the permit cancelled and the $55,000 Charlottesville Broadcasting invested into it deducted from the sale price. WVIR, which was to occupy channel 64, then moved to channel 29 and signed on in 1973.

== Programming ==
WINA's local programming on normal broadcast days consist of a news block in morning drive, The Schilling Show (conservative talk) in midday, and an additional news and discussion hour followed by The Best Seat in the House (sports talk) in afternoon drive. Syndicated conservative talk hosts Mike Gallagher, Markley, Van Camp and Robbins, Mark Levin, McGraw Milhaven, and Red Eye Radio fill out the broadcast day. Bulletins from ABC News Radio are on the hour since the 2026 closure of CBS News Radio.

WINA is the flagship station of the Virginia Sports Radio Network, originating the network's live coverage of all University of Virginia Cavaliers men's basketball and football games, as well as a coach's show (Coach's Corner) for the in-season sport at 7 p.m. on Tuesday evenings. WINA also individually carries most baseball and men's lacrosse games, and selected women's basketball and women's lacrosse games.

== Translator ==
WINA is relayed by one FM translator. The translator launched on November 29, 2015.

Call sign	Frequency	City of license	FID	ERP (W)	HAAT	Class	FCC info
W255CT	(98.9 FM) FM	Charlottesville, Virginia	18875	250 watts	318 m (1,043 ft)	D	LMS
