= WVXL =

Radio station in Christiansburg, Virginia

Simulcast of WPSK-FM Pulaski
- Christiansburg, Virginia; United States
- Broadcast area: New River Valley
- Frequency: 100.7 MHz
- Branding: WPSK XL

Programming
- Format: Country
- Affiliations: Compass Media Networks; Motor Racing Network; Westwood One

Ownership
- Owner: Monticello Media LLC
- Sister stations: WBRW, WPSK-FM, WRAD, WRAD-FM

History
- First air date: 1992 (as WBNK)
- Former call signs: WFNR-FM (1990–1992); WBNK (1992–1998); WBZV (1998–2000); WFNR-FM (2000–2009); WNMX (2009–2018); WVHK (2018–2024)

Technical information
- Licensing authority: FCC
- Facility ID: 69744
- Class: A
- ERP: 820 watts
- HAAT: 270 meters (890 ft)
- Transmitter coordinates: 37°5′31″N 80°18′21″W

Links
- Public license information: Public file; LMS
- Webcast: Listen live
- Website: www.107countrypsk.com

WVXL (100.7 FM) is a country music formatted broadcast radio station licensed to Christiansburg, Virginia, serving the New River Valley. WVXL is owned and operated by Monticello Media. It serves as a simulcast of WPSK-FM.

== History ==
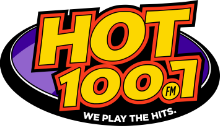
Logo as "Hot 100.7"

On September 6, 2018, Cumulus Media announced it would sell its Blacksburg cluster to Monticello Media; at the time of the sale, the station was WNMX "Mix 100.7", with a hot adult contemporary format. The sale was approved December 1, 2018. On January 20, 2019, the station's format was switched to contemporary hit radio and the branding to "Hot 100.7".

WVHK began simulcasting country music sister station WPSK-FM on June 3, 2024, under the WVXL call sign and branded as "WPSK XL".
