= WRAD (AM) =

Simulcasts WRAD-FM Radford
- Radford, Virginia; United States
- Broadcast area: Pulaski County; Montgomery County
- Frequency: 1460 kHz
- Branding: "Talk Radio WRAD"

Programming
- Format: Talk radio
- Network: Fox News Radio
- Affiliations: Premiere Networks; Salem Radio Network; Westwood One

Ownership
- Owner: Monticello Media LLC
- Sister stations: WBRW, WPSK-FM, WRAD-FM, WVXL

History
- First air date: 1950; 76 years ago
- Call sign meaning: Radford

Technical information
- Licensing authority: FCC
- Facility ID: 73919
- Class: D
- Power: 5,000 watts day; 37 watts night
- Transmitter coordinates: 37°8′35″N 80°34′38″W
- Translator: 103.5 W278AJ (Blacksburg)

Links
- Public license information: Public file; LMS
- Webcast: Listen live
- Website: www.wradradio.com

WRAD (1460 kHz) is a commercial radio station licensed to Radford, Virginia, serving Pulaski and Montgomery Counties in Virginia. It simulcasts a talk radio format with co-owned WRAD-FM at 101.7 MHz. Programming is also heard on FM translator 103.5 W278AJ in Blacksburg, Virginia.

WRAD-AM-FM are owned by Monticello Media LLC. The studios and offices are on Lee Highway in Radford. By day, WRAD is powered at 5,000 watts non-directional. At night, to protect other stations on 1460 AM from interference, WRAD reduces power to 37 watts.

== Programming ==
Much of the weekday schedule on WRAD-AM-FM is nationally syndicated. Hosts include Brian Kilmeade, Charlie Kirk, Sean Hannity, Dave Ramsey and Red Eye Radio. Weekends feature shows on money, health, real estate, and technology. Weekend hosts include Kim Komando, as well as repeats of weekday shows. Most hours begin with an update from Fox News Radio.

== History ==
The station signed on the air in 1950. In 1965, it added a sister station, WRAD-FM at 101.7 MHz.

WRAD-AM-FM had been owned and operated by Cumulus Media, Inc. On September 6, 2018, Cumulus Media announced it would sell its Blacksburg cluster to Monticello Media. The sale was approved December 1, 2018.

== Translator ==
Call sign	Frequency	City of license	FID	ERP (W)	Class	Transmitter coordinates	FCC info
W278AJ	103.5 FM	Blacksburg, Virginia	81543	200	D	37°11′11.6″N 80°28′53.8″W	LMS
