= Monticello Media =

American radio broadcasting company

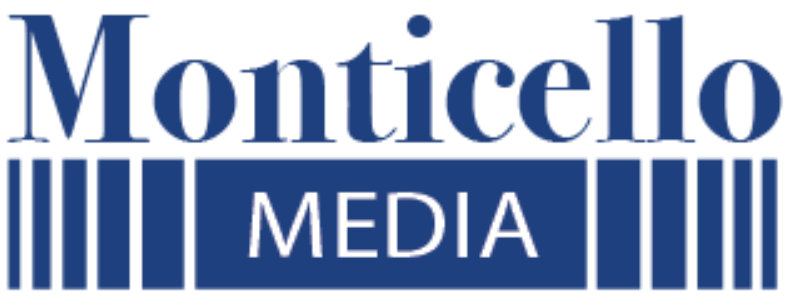
- Industry: Radio broadcasting
- Founded: 2007; 18 years ago
- Headquarters: Charlottesville, Virginia, United States
- Website: www.monticellomedia.com

Monticello Media is an American radio broadcasting company that operates six radio stations and two translators in the Charlottesville, Virginia area. The company was formed in 2007 following the purchase of stations previously owned by Clear Channel Communications. In 2018, the company acquired six stations in the Blacksburg, Virginia area from Cumulus Media.

== Stations ==
AM Stations	FM Stations

Market	Station	Owned Since	Format	Notes
Radford, Virginia	WRAD 1460	2018	News/talk	simulcasts on translator W278AJ 103.5
Christiansburg, Virginia	WVXL 100.7	2018	Country	
Radford, Virginia	WRAD-FM 101.7	2018	News/talk	
Blacksburg, Virginia	WBRW 105.3	2018	Active rock	
Pulaski, Virginia	WPSK-FM 107.1	2018	Country	
Charlottesville, Virginia	WCHV 1260	2007	News/talk	
Charlottesville, Virginia	WKAV 1400	2007	Contemporary Christian	simulcasts on translator W231AD 94.1
Staunton, Virginia	WCYK-FM 99.7	2007	Country	
Ruckersville, Virginia	WHTE-FM 101.9	2007	Contemporary hit radio	simulcasts on translator W285EF 104.9
Crozet, Virginia	WHUK 102.3	2007	Adult hits	
Charlottesville, Virginia	WCHV-FM 107.5	2007	News/talk	

=== Former stations ===
Market	Station	Owned	Current status
Blacksburg, Virginia	WFNR 710	2018–2022	defunct, license canceled in 2022

== Key people ==
- Owner: George Reed
- General Manager: Mike Chiumento
