= WRAD-FM =

- Radford, Virginia; United States
- Broadcast area: Pulaski County; Montgomery County
- Frequency: 101.7 MHz
- Branding: "Talk Radio WRAD"

Programming
- Format: Talk radio
- Network: Fox News Radio
- Affiliations: Premiere Networks; Salem Radio Network; Westwood One

Ownership
- Owner: Monticello Media LLC
- Sister stations: WBRW, WVXL, WPSK-FM, WRAD

History
- First air date: 1965; 61 years ago
- Former call signs: WRAD-FM (1965–1978); WRIQ (1978–1998); WNRV-FM (1998–1999); WBXW (1999–2002); WWBU (2002–2018)
- Call sign meaning: Radford

Technical information
- Licensing authority: FCC
- Facility ID: 73918
- Class: A
- ERP: 5,800 watts
- HAAT: 20 meters (66 ft)
- Transmitter coordinates: 37°8′33″N 80°34′39″W
- Repeater: 1460 WRAD (Radford)

Links
- Public license information: Public file; LMS
- Webcast: Listen live
- Website: www.wradradio.com

WRAD-FM (101.7 MHz) is a commercial radio station licensed to Radford, Virginia, serving Pulaski and Montgomery Counties in Virginia. It simulcasts a talk radio format with co-owned WRAD at 1460 kHz. Programming is also heard on FM translator 103.5 W278AJ in Blacksburg, Virginia.

WRAD-AM-FM are owned by Monticello Media LLC. The studios and offices are on Lee Highway in Radford. WRAD-FM has an effective radiated power (ERP) of 5,800 watts. The transmitter is on Lee Highway (U.S. Route 11) in Fairlawn, Virginia, near the New River.

== Programming ==
Much of the weekday schedule on WRAD-AM-FM is nationally syndicated. Hosts include Brian Kilmeade, Charlie Kirk, Sean Hannity, Dave Ramsey and Red Eye Radio. Weekends feature shows on money, health, real estate, and technology. Weekend hosts include Kim Komando, as well as repeats of weekday shows. Most hours begin with an update from Fox News Radio.

== History ==
The station signed on the air in 1965. At first, it was a simulcast of WRAD (1460 AM), which had begun in 1950. Over the years, the FM station tried several different formats, with new call signs: WRIQ, WNRV-FM, WBXW, WWBU. In 2018, it returned to its original call letters, WRAD-FM, as it began simulcasting a talk radio format with its AM sister station.

WRAD-AM-FM had been owned and operated by Cumulus Media, Inc. On September 6, 2018, Cumulus Media announced it would sell its Blacksburg cluster to Monticello Media. The sale was approved December 1, 2018.
