= Mike Nealy =

American sports executive

- Born: United States
- Citizenship: United States
- Occupation: Executive Director
- Years active: 2014 – present
- Organization: Fiesta Bowl
- Spouse: Brenda
- Children: 2

Mike Nealy is an American sports executive. He was the president, CEO, and alternate governor of the Arizona Coyotes of the National Hockey League (NHL) until 2014 when he was named the executive director of the Fiesta Bowl.
