= WTJU =

Radio station at the University of Virginia

- Charlottesville, Virginia; United States
- Broadcast area: Charlottesville, Virginia; Albemarle County, Virginia
- Frequency: 91.1 MHz
- Branding: WTJU

Programming
- Format: College

Ownership
- Owner: University of Virginia
- Sister stations: WXTJ-LP

History
- First air date: May 10, 1957
- Former frequencies: 91.3 MHz (1957–1993)
- Call sign meaning: W Thomas Jefferson's University

Technical information
- Licensing authority: FCC
- Facility ID: 69145
- Class: B1
- Power: 1,500 watts
- HAAT: 325 meters (1,066 ft)
- Transmitter coordinates: 37°58′55.0″N 78°29′3.0″W

Links
- Public license information: Public file; LMS
- Webcast: WTJU Player & Playlist
- Website: WTJU Online

WTJU is a College Radio-formatted broadcast radio station licensed to Charlottesville, Virginia, serving Charlottesville and Albemarle County, Virginia. WTJU is owned and operated by the University of Virginia.

== History ==
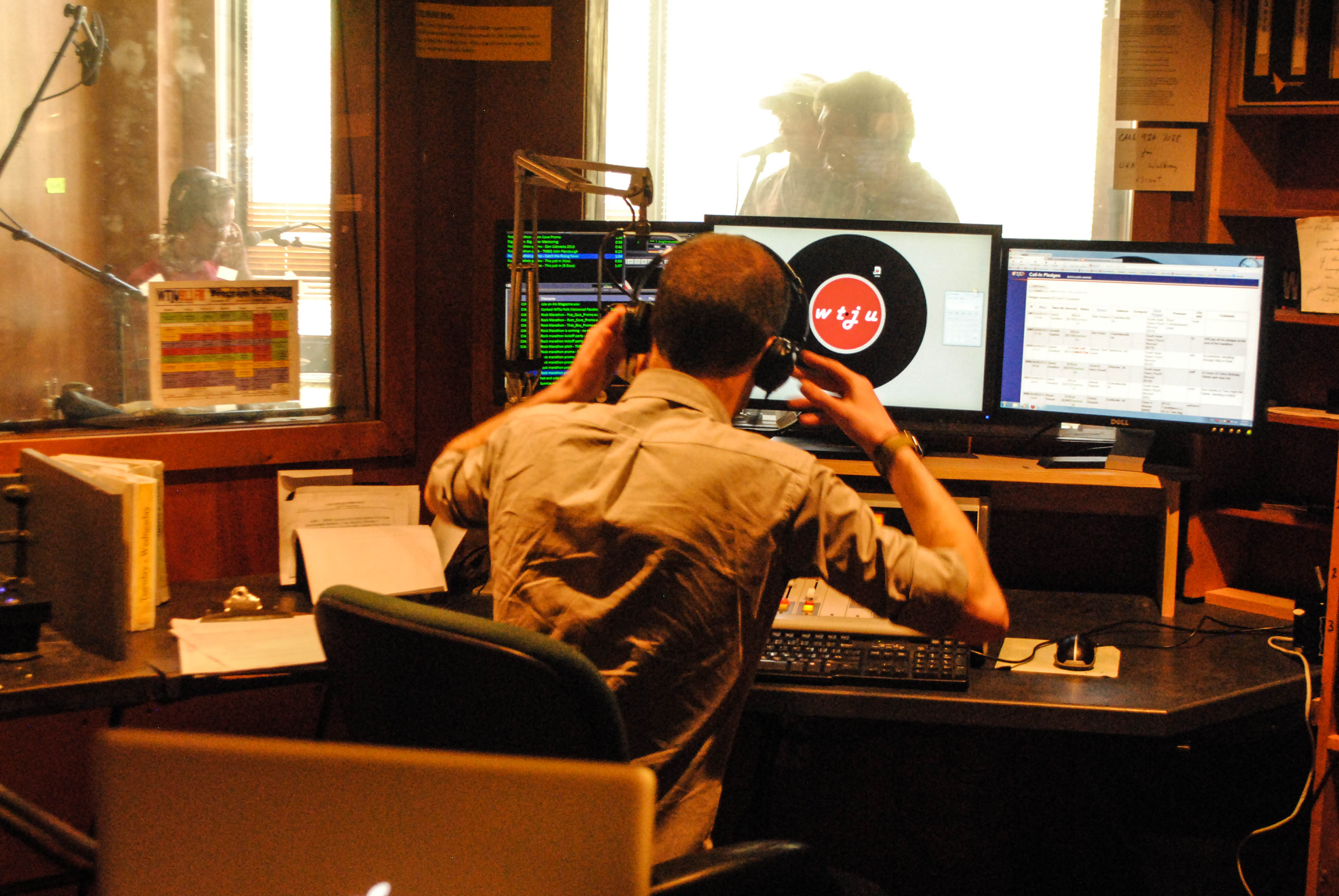
A WTJU DJ hosts a show during the 2013 Rock Marathon

WTJU was founded in 1955 when the University of Virginia’s Department of Speech and Drama decided to start an educational radio station to serve the larger community. WUVA, the university's carrier current AM radio station, had been broadcasting popular music to students since 1947. The Kappa Delta Pi fraternity put up a large part of the funds necessary to get the station off the ground. On May 10, 1957, WTJU went on the air at 91.3 FM with a classical music format and was able to broadcast throughout Charlottesville, building a small but dedicated group of listeners.

In 1959, the station aired its first ever music marathon: the Classical Marathon, held during UVA’s exam period. In 1963, WTJU became a full-fledged student organization, separate from the university's Department of Speech and Drama. By 1971, WTJU began broadcasting rock music, as well as some jazz and folk programs. By 1974, WTJU was broadcasting 24 hours a day and also allowed non-students to be DJs in order to keep the station broadcasting 24/7 year-round.

In 1993, WTJU's license was threatened when student administrators accidentally violated FCC rules in filing a routine document. The Dean of Students office insisted the station hire its first paid staff member, general manager Chuck Taylor, requiring a transition from an independent student organization – the model followed by WUVA – to direct oversight from the university. In the same year, WTJU changed its frequency from 91.3 to 91.1 FM. In the late 1990s, planned construction at UVA's Peabody Hall forced WTJU to relocate into studios in Lambeth Commons. By 2010, WTJU had also started streaming its radio programming over the internet.

Taylor retired in 2010. At the time, the station had low listenership and was in deep financial trouble. Administrators pressed ahead with a search for new management, even as the university's Board of Visitors approved turning in the station's license if they did not see a path to viability. Burr Beard was hired as Taylor's replacement in April 2010. Beard proposed sweeping changes to the station’s operation: abandoning the longstanding freeform scheduling policy in favor of a focus on "Americana" music; moving specialty jazz and rock programs to evening and late night, respectively; eliminating classical music altogether; and instituting a small rotation of four songs per hour. Beard's proposals led to backlash from both volunteers and listeners, who feared the potential loss of the station's identity and cancellations of specialty shows. Beard resigned in October 2010 without implementing any changes and the station began its search for a new manager. In 2011, Nathan Moore was hired and is the current general manager. The station has seen a resurgence of interest and increased fundraising in the following years.

In 2011, WTJU participated in the first-ever College Radio Day.

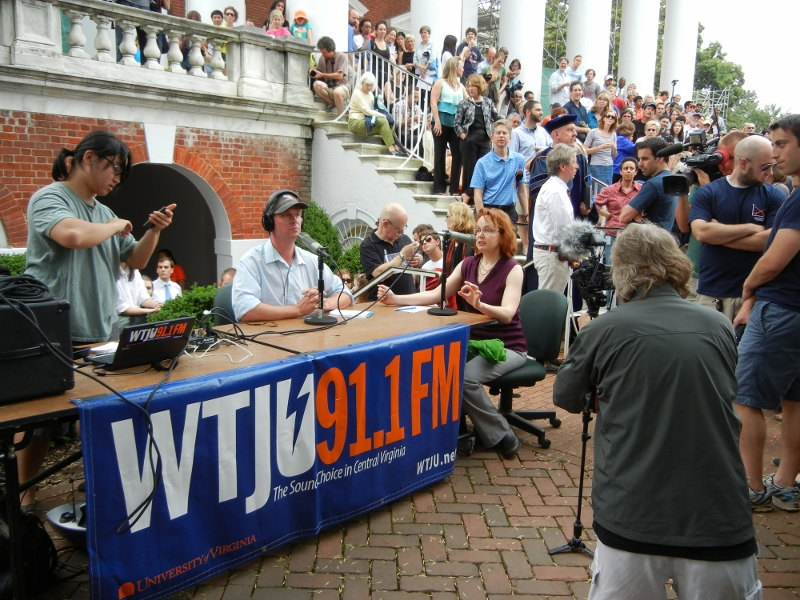
WTJU hosts a live remote broadcast from the "Rally on the Lawn," where thousands of students, faculty, alumni, and community members had gathered to support then recently ousted University of Virginia President Teresa Sullivan

In 2012, WTJU aired a live remote broadcast of the "Rally on the Lawn" demonstration against the ouster of UVA President Teresa A. Sullivan. Also in 2012, WTJU aired a special modern adaptation of The War of the Worlds on Halloween night.

On February 1, 2015, WTJU entered into a three-year local marketing agreement with WHAN (1430 AM) in Ashland, Virginia. WTJU's programming was rebroadcast on WHAN and its FM translator (W275BQ, 102.9 FM) to cover the city of Richmond with a broadcast signal. WTJU exited the agreement early on August 16, 2017, as the signal was found to be inadequate and the increase in underwriting from the Richmond market did not offset the cost.

In addition to its on-air activities, WTJU also produces a variety of music and educational events such as live concerts, film screenings, and youth radio camps. Since 2015, WTJU has hosted a series of free outdoor concerts at Charlottesville's IX Art Park each fall, emphasizing eclectic music and creative community building.

In March 2019, WTJU and WXTJ-LP moved into new studios, which include a stage for live performances and community events. On March 23, the station opened the new studios by breaking the Guinness World Record for "most radio DJs presenting one radio show simultaneously," although it only briefly held the title as it was broken again 18 days later.

Among the well-known artists who have been DJs at WTJU are Pavement's Stephen Malkmus, Dave Matthews Band's Boyd Tinsley, Rolling Stone critic Rob Sheffield, Yo La Tengo's James McNew, Jagjaguwar founder Darius Van Arman, and blues musician Corey Harris.

== WXTJ ==
Hiring professional staff in the 1990s necessitated removing WTJU from limits on non-university-affiliated members that bind student organizations and club sports. Initially brought on to keep the station running over breaks, community members began making up an increasing proportion of announcers in the 1990s and 2000s. In response to declining student involvement, WTJU founded WXTJ-LP (100.1 FM), a sister station run and staffed entirely by students, in October 2013. WXTJ operates within WTJU's building and primarily consists of rock, hip hop, and electronic music. Several student DJs host programs on both stations.

== Programming ==
WTJU allows its volunteer DJs to play nearly anything they choose within Federal Communications Commission (FCC) rules. All of WTJU's DJs are volunteers, including students, faculty, staff, alumni, and community members. Most of the shows feature music and are broadly categorized into classical, folk, jazz and blues, and rock. The music across all genres tends to be eclectic, with an emphasis on music that is seldom heard on commercial radio stations.

The station's schedule includes some spoken-word programming in overnights and short public-affairs modules during and between shows.
