= WCHV (AM) =

Radio station in Charlottesville, Virginia

- Charlottesville, Virginia; United States
- Broadcast area: Charlottesville, Virginia; Albemarle County, Virginia
- Frequency: 1260 kHz
- Branding: C-Ville 107.5 and 1260

Programming
- Format: News/talk/sports
- Affiliations: Fox News Radio; Compass Media Networks; Premiere Networks; Salem Radio Network

Ownership
- Owner: Monticello Media; (Monticello Media, LLC)
- Sister stations: WCHV-FM, WCYK-FM, WHTE-FM, WHUK, WKAV

History
- First air date: October 24, 1929
- Former call signs: WEHC (1929–1935)
- Former frequencies: 1370 kHz (1929); 1200 kHz (1930–1931); 1350 kHz (1931–1935); 1420 kHz (1935–1941); 1450 kHz (1941–1944); 1240 kHz (1944–1955)
- Call sign meaning: CHarlottesVille

Technical information
- Licensing authority: FCC
- Facility ID: 19838
- Class: D
- Power: 800 watts daytime only
- Transmitter coordinates: 38°6′52.2″N 78°27′16.8″W
- Translator: 107.9 W300DV (Charlottesville)
- Repeater: 107.5 WCHV-FM (Charlottesville)

Links
- Public license information: Public file; LMS
- Webcast: WCHV Webstream
- Website: WCHV Online

WCHV is a news/talk-formatted broadcast radio station licensed to Charlottesville, Virginia, serving Charlottesville and Albemarle County, Virginia. WCHV is owned and operated by Monticello Media.

== History ==
=== Early history: WEHC ===
Emory and Henry College signed on WEHC on October 24, 1929, broadcasting on 1370 kHz from Emory, Virginia. The station was run mostly by students and represented before the Federal Radio Commission by faculty member W. Byron Brown. In fall 1932, during the depths of the Great Depression, the college sold the station to Brown's Community Broadcasting Corporation for $5,000 (equivalent to $117,988 in 2025). Brown then filed to relocate to Charlottesville. The last broadcast from Emory was on December 2, when the station filed to go silent in preparation for the move.

Terrestrial college radio returned to Emory in 1992 with the sign-on of an FM station, which also took the callsign WEHC.

=== In Charlottesville ===
The new station was built and on the air on 1350 kHz in Charlottesville in September 1933, but did not change to its current callsign until 1935.

With no network affiliations yet available, WCHV inaugurated its own network on February 1, 1936: the Virginia Broadcasting System, with affiliates WBTM Danville, WLVA Lynchburg, WGH Newport News, and WPHR Richmond. A planned 16-hour day of common programming failed in three months due to the high cost of telephone lines, although the network links remained to carry advertised broadcasts of Virginia Cavaliers sports and other one-off programming. It is unknown when exactly the network dissolved.

WCHV eventually became a partial affiliate of Mutual in 1938 by gaining permission to rebroadcast the signals of WCLE Cleveland and WOR Newark during sustaining programs only. In September 1941, it formally joined the NBC Blue Network. The station would stick with the network when it became ABC Radio, then one of ABC's split networks through 1991. The station's programming day settled on what is now called full service with middle-of-the-road music.

After W.B. Brown sold control of Community Broadcasting in 1936, the corporation changed hands several times, until local businessman Charles Barham, Jr. took majority ownership in 1940. By 1942, he owned over 99 percent of the company, and transferred legal control to himself and his wife under the name Barham and Barham.

The Barhams sold to Roger and Louise Neuhoff's Eastern Broadcasting Corporation in 1958 after a sale to one of the station's announcers fell through.

The Neuhoffs signed on a companion FM station, WCCV-FM on 97.5 MHz, in 1960. Unusually for an AM-FM pairing at the time, the FM station had a different callsign and was programmed independently with an easy listening format to flank the AM station, which had evolved to adult contemporary. The FM station is now active rock WWWV.

The two stations went through three more ownership changes; the Neuhoffs sold the two stations to Charlottesville resident Edward S. Evans, Jr. in 1968, and Evans then sold them to Lyell B. Clay's Clay Broadcasting in 1973. Clay sold all of his broadcasting interests in 1987; WCHV and WWWV went to Eure Communications, then-owners of WXEZ Yorktown.

Eure tweaked the station to oldies music with news from CNN Radio during 1992. A C-QUAM AM stereo signal was put into operation around this time. The music flipped again to urban contemporary in 1997.

Eure concluded a merger deal with Charlottesville Broadcasting Corp., owners of WINA (1070 kHz), WQMZ (95.1 MHz), and WKAV (1400 kHz), in 1998. The deal was scrutinized by the FCC and Department of Justice as it would have resulted in one entity owning five popular stations in the small market. The transaction was completed in 2000 after the new Eure was forced to spin off WCHV and WKAV to Clear Channel.

Clear Channel first flipped the station to sports talk programming from Fox Sports Radio under the brand "Sports Radio 1260". In mid-2001, this programming was moved to WKAV, and WCHV was flipped again to news and talk as "AM 1260 WCHV".

George Reed's Sistema 102, LLC, later renamed to Monticello Media, bought all of Clear Channel's Charlottesville stations in June 2007. After taking control, Monticello added a downtown Charlottesville FM translator (94.1 MHz, previously associated with WZGN) and tweaked the branding to "News Talk 1260 WCHV", but kept programming the same.

Monticello replaced the translator with a full-powered FM simulcast on January 20, 2011, by flipping its 107.5 MHz facility from adult hits. This station took the callsign WCHV-FM to match.

With the August 2015 flip of WKAV from sports to classic country, WCHV and WCHV-FM picked up that station's affiliations with the Washington Nationals, Washington Capitals, Washington Wizards, Washington Commanders, and Virginia Tech Hokies radio networks. No longer strictly broadcasting news and talk, the stations' branding adjusted to the current "C-Ville 107.5 and 1260". The station has subsequently dropped all these teams except the Nationals, while picking up NASCAR Cup Series broadcasts from the Motor Racing Network and Performance Racing Network.

In September 2016, WCHV filed for special temporary authority to reduce its maximum power to 25 percent of its licensed level (from 5 kW day and 2.5 kW night to 1.25 kW day and 625 watts night) and allow non-directional operation due to significant equipment failures and damage to its ground system. The station's directional array was completely inoperable due to the failed equipment. Monticello told the FCC its plans if replacing the equipment was not feasible were to reduce WCHV's licensed power level and operate non-directional permanently. Monticello then applied in July 2020 to reduce WCHV's daytime power to 800 watts non-directional and discontinue nighttime operation altogether, thereby downgrading to Class D. This downgrade, along with the demolition of three of the former directional array's four towers, was completed in November 2023.

WCHV received its own FM translator W300DV on 107.9 MHz, pursuant to the FCC's AM revitalization program. This translator signed on in May 2021, and currently holds a construction permit to move to 99.3 MHz at the market antenna farm.

On March 30, 2024, Monticello Media abruptly fired program director and morning host Joe Thomas, who had been in those roles since 2007, when it was publicly reported that he was buying Staunton-based WTON (1240 AM) and two FM translators with plans to flip them to a competing news-talk-sports format. Monticello Media stated that the purchase created an unacceptable conflict of interest, while Thomas refused to comment. Thomas moved his morning show to WTON the following May 25.

=== Television ===
In 1952, as the FCC was reallocating television channels, Charlottesville was given only one – UHF channel 45 reserved for educational use. The Barhams and the city of Charlottesville jointly proposed to move VHF channel 8 from Petersburg, arguing that a planned mountaintop transmitter near Crozet would serve a large swath of northern and central Virginia, most of which would be receiving its first clear television signal. The FCC denied the request, although the commission recognized that the nearest commercial allotment (channel 42 in Waynesboro) would be rendered unusable by the mountains and added channel 64 to Charlottesville. The Barhams settled for channel 64 and were granted the city's first television permit, WCHV-TV, on January 29, 1953.

One week later, CBS affiliate WLVA-TV signed from Lynchburg on VHF channel 13, and city residents reported "excellent" reception. Richmond's NBC station, WTVR-TV on channel 6, also covered the area. Particularly in areas with existing VHF broadcasters, early UHF stations were largely futile efforts until Congress mandated UHF tuners with the 1961 All-Channel Receiver Act. Reflecting the inferiority of UHF transmitting and receiving equipment of the time, a report in the Daily Progress compared the quality difference of VHF and UHF television to the difference between local AM radio and shortwave. WCHV-TV's permit was extended several times and returned to the FCC in January 1954, citing insufficient prospects for economic support.

After radio competitor WINA also failed to put a television station on the air in the late 1960s, Charlottesville did not get a local station until NBC affiliate WVIR's sign-on in 1973.

== Translator ==
Call sign	Frequency	City of license	FID	ERP (W)	HAAT	Class	FCC info
W300DV	107.9 FM	Charlottesville, Virginia	202503	250	55 m (180 ft)	D	LMS
