= WQMZ =

Radio station in Charlottesville, Virginia

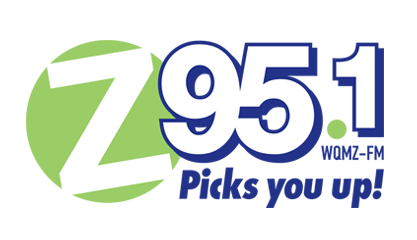
- Charlottesville, Virginia; United States
- Broadcast area: Charlottesville metropolitan area; Albemarle County
- Frequency: 95.1 MHz (HD Radio)
- Branding: Z95.1

Programming
- Format: Adult contemporary
- Affiliations: Premiere Networks

Ownership
- Owner: Saga Communications; (Tidewater Communications, LLC)
- Sister stations: WCNR; WCVL-FM; WINA; WWWV

History
- First air date: October 1954 (as WINA-FM at 95.3)
- Former call signs: WINA-FM (1954–1971); WQMC (1971–1987)
- Former frequencies: 95.3 MHz (1954–1988)

Technical information
- Licensing authority: FCC
- Facility ID: 10653
- Class: A
- ERP: 6,000 watts
- HAAT: 99 meters (325 ft)
- Transmitter coordinates: 38°2′54.0″N 78°28′12.0″W

Links
- Public license information: Public file; LMS
- Webcast: Listen Live
- Website: z951.com

WQMZ (95.1 FM) is an adult contemporary formatted broadcast radio station licensed to Charlottesville, Virginia, United States, serving the Charlottesville metropolitan area and Albemarle County. WQMZ is owned by Saga Communications, and operates as part of its Charlottesville Radio Group.

== History ==
Charlottesville Broadcasting Corporation signed on WINA-FM as the city's first FM radio station in October 1954. The station began on 95.3 MHz and was a 24-hour relay of co-owned WINA's full service programming and middle-of-the-road music.

In the late 1960s, the Federal Communications Commission began scrutinizing the practice of a co-owned AM-FM pair broadcasting a common programming day. In 1964, such simulcasting was limited to half of the broadcast day. WINA-FM was initially exempt because the rule only applied to markets with a population of over 100,000. However, when Charlottesville Broadcasting was sold to new owner Laurence G. Richardson in 1969, the FCC made adherence to the programming separation rule a condition of the sale.

Accordingly, on March 15, 1971, the station flipped to a new format broadly described as light adult contemporary. At the time, this was closer to what is now considered easy listening: soft pop music, standards, show tunes, and an evening block of light music. This was followed in May by a callsign change to WQMC. Simulcasting with WINA continued during morning drive until 1984.

The station adopted the current WQMZ callsign in December 1987, and moved to 95.1 MHz in order to proceed with a power upgrade the following year. The station remained its light adult contemporary format for 20 years. In the early 1990s, the station changed its format to hot adult contemporary, and was rebranded as "Heat 95" or "95 FM The Heat". Later in the decade, it changed its branding to "Lite Rock Z95" and its format to soft adult contemporary. The "Z95" branding was renamed "Z95.1" in 2003, and would later upgrade its format to its current adult contemporary format.

Saga purchased WQMZ, WINA and WWWV from Eure Communications, which merged with Charlottesville Broadcasting in 1998.
