= Village School =

Village School may refer to:

- a one-room school, or "village school"
- Village School, a 1955 novel by Miss Read.

== Schools ==
United Kingdom

- The Village School (London)

United States

- Village School (Campbell, California)
- Village School (Pacific Palisades, California)
- Village School (Unity, Maine)
- Village School (Holmdel, New Jersey)
- Village Elementary School, Princeton Junction, New Jersey
- Village School (Great Neck, New York)
- Village School (Charlottesville, Virginia)
- The Village School (Royalston, Massachusetts)
- The Village School (Eugene, Oregon)
- The Village School (Houston, Texas)
- The Village School (Richardson, Texas)
- Auburn Village School, Auburn, New Hampshire

Australia

- Village School (Croydon North, Victoria)
