= Virginia Festival of the Book =

Annual literary festival in Virginia

The Virginia Festival of the Book is an annual literary festival held in March in Charlottesville, Virginia. Virginia Humanities is the organizer.

== History ==
The festival was established by Cal Otto, Paul Collinge, and Tom Dowd. Cal Otto was the founder of the American Ephemeral Society and active in the American Antiquarian Society. Paul Collinge established Heartwood Books in The Corner in 1975. Tom Dowd, a University of Virginia professor, brought Cal Otto to meet with Paul Collinge at his bookstore, and together, they started the festival.

=== 1995 ===
In 1994, an article in U.S. News & World Report ranked Charlottesville as third highest in the United States for books read per person. In that context, the organized set the theme for the first festival as, "Charlottesville: a place for books".

The first festival was on March 30, 1995. Speakers at that first festival included Rita Mae Brown, George Garrett, Rita Dove, John Casey, Jonathan Coleman, Joyce Carol Oates, Gregory Orr, and Charles Wright.

It was described to be successful, with attendance exceeding organizers' expectations, leading to plans for future expansion.

=== 2024 ===
The 30th annual Festival featured 80 events and 120 authors over 4 days. Presenters included Roxane Gay, Jeannette Walls, Adriana Trigiani, and Ada Limón.

== Further consideration ==
- video archive of 2024 presentations
