= McIntire High School =

Coordinates: 38°02′36″N 78°28′39″W

Location
- 1000 Birdwood Road; Charlottesville, Virginia, 22902

McIntire High School is a now-closed high school built in the early twentieth century by the Public Works Administration, with funding by Charlottesville philanthropist Paul Goodloe McIntire. It now houses a private Christian school, The Covenant School. The structure is a two-story building, made of brick, with a tetrastyle portico, fluted columns, and grouped windows.
