= Charlottesville Open Data Portal =

The Charlottesville Open Data Portal is the open data portal for the city of Charlottesville, Virginia, in the United States.

== Establishment ==
The portal opened in 2017. Its establishment was the outcome of community planning. Organizers of the portal included the City of Charlottesville's Open Data Advisory Group, researchers from the University of Virginia, representatives of local business and nonprofit organizations, and Mayor Mike Signer. The Charlottesville City Council supported the portal by adopting an official city open data policy which they got from the advisory group. A priority in establishing the portal was the protection of privacy of Charlottesville residents.

The portal opened with 72 datasets. Of these, 65 were map related.

== Uses ==
In 2017 a local real estate organization reported using the portal to access city information on building permits and the installation of solar panels.

In 2020 Smart Cville, a civic organization, reported that the portal now had the collection of Charlottesville Master Address Points. This is the authoritative collection for all building addresses in the City of Charlottesville. Smart Cville described this dataset as the most important collection to date in the open data portal.

== Response ==
A 2019 university research project attempted to use datasets in the portal to analyze contemporary issues and also as an exercise in examining the usability of the portal itself. The researchers remarked that in the 2 years since the establishment of the portal, there was little evidence of public use, despite community outreach being an objective of the portal. The researchers reported reasons for lack of use, including the challenge of making sense of fragmented data, challenges exporting the data from the portal and into other applications, and the lack of web-based tools within the portal to perform functions such as data visualization on user demand.
