= The Covenant School (Virginia) =

Private school in Charlottesville, Virginia, US

Location
- 175 Hickory Street; Charlottesville, Virginia

Information
- School type: Private Christian school
- Founded: 1985
- Head of school: Brad Baggett(All School)
- Grades: Pre-K - 5 (Birdwood Campus); 6-12 (Hickory Campus)
- Enrollment: 751
- Campus: Suburban
- Colors: Blue and White
- Mascot: Eagles
- Website: covenantschool.org

The Covenant School (TCS) is a private Christian school in Charlottesville, Virginia, in the United States. It is composed of the Birdwood Campus, which houses the Lower School (Grades Pre-K—5), located in the former McIntire High School, and the Hickory Campus, which is home to the Middle (Grades 6–8) and Upper (Grades 9–12) Schools. The Hickory Campus is in Albemarle County in a building completed in 2002.

== History ==
The Covenant School was founded in 1985, opening its doors with 46 students in Grades K-6. In 1987, the school offered a full K-12 program. The school was restructured as a K-8 school in 1990, then added Grade 9 in 1992, Grade 10 in 1994, Grade 11 in 1995, and Grade 12 in the fall of 1996, graduating 43 seniors in May 1997. A pre-K program was added in the fall of 2003. The 2007–2008 school year saw a peak enrollment of 710 students.

== Traditions ==
=== Chapel ===
The school community gathers in worship every Wednesday at the Hickory and Birdwood Campus. At Birdwood, students and parents actively participate in the service: leading music, reading scripture, and reciting The Lord's Prayer. Arts performances by fifth-grade students include handbells and choir. A weekly parent prayer time follows chapel. At Hickory, this worship time consists of a student-led music team, various scripture and historic Christian creeds readings, personal testimonies, and a message from the chaplain, a teacher, or a community member. A parent prayer time precedes the chapel each week.

=== House ===
In 2014 the school founded the House program. A quartet of communities named for the cardinal virtues of Temperance, Fortitude, Wisdom, and Justice, the House System stands at the center of fellowship on the Hickory Campus. Upon attending, each individual finds a home in one of the four Houses. The four house colors are red, dark green, light blue, and dark blue. House also provides educational leadership and administrative opportunities for students through the House Leadership Team, a body of elected student officials, and a faculty Head of House who shepherds a House throughout the year. A House Leadership Team leads each House—ten elected student leaders and a faculty Head of House who fulfill roles from the president to community service coordinator to a chaplain. The House motto is "For Others, For Christ".

=== Rock ceremony ===
A culminating Lower School grade-level event, the Rock Ceremony is an opportunity for teachers to affirm each student with a Bible verse written on a smooth rock for them to keep. Verses are individualized for each student and represent their God-given gifts and talents.

=== Live nativity ===
Held on the front lawn of the Birdwood Campus each December, this Christmas worship event with live animals and actors is open to the public.

== Athletics ==
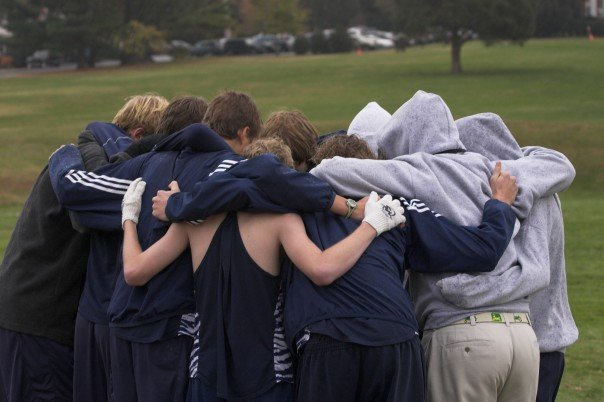

The Athletics Department has 19 athletic programs and 36 state championships. They are a Division II school in the Virginia Independent School Athletic Association (VISAA). The school competes in the Blue Ridge Conference (BRC) and the Virginia Independent Conference (VIC). On June 13, 2019, the school hired Jason Bennett as the new athletic director.

=== Championships ===
Sport	Competition name	Year
Basketball (Boys)	Conference	2001
Basketball (Girls)	Conference	1996, 1998, 2002, 2007, 2008, 2009, 2010
Baseball	State	2000, 2011
Baseball	Conference	1999, 2000, 2002, 2004, 2005, 2010, 2011
Cross country (Boys)	State	2006, 2007
Cross country (Boys)	Conference	2006, 2007
Cross country (Girls)	State	2007, 2008, 2015, 2016
Field hockey	State	2016
Field hockey	Conference	2002, 2004, 2009, 2010, 2018, 2021
Football	State	2019, 2022, 2024
Football	Conference	2019, 2022, 2024
Golf	State	2011
Golf	Conference	2011, 2013
Indoor track	Conference	2019
Lacrosse (Boys)	State	2003, 2004, 2005, 2006, 2008, 2014, 2015
Lacrosse (Boys)	Conference	1998, 1999, 2000, 2001, 2002, 2003, 2004, 2005, 2006, 2008, 2009, 2014
Lacrosse (Girls)	State	2013
Lacrosse (Girls)	Conference	2003, 2004, 2005
Soccer (Boys)	State	2013, 2019
Soccer (Boys)	Conference	1994, 1997, 2019
Soccer (Girls)	State	2002, 2008, 2009
Soccer (Girls)	Conference	2000, 2008, 2009, 2019
Softball	Conference	2013, 2014
Tennis (Boys)	State	2008, 2009, 2010, 2011, 2012, 2013, 2017
Tennis (Boys)	Conference	1998, 1999, 2007, 2008, 2009, 2010, 2011, 2012, 2013, 2014, 2017, 2019
Tennis (Girls)	State	2015
Tennis (Girls)	Conference	2001
Track and field	Conference	2019
Volleyball	Conference	2004, 2006, 2008
Wrestling	State	2019

== Notable alumni ==
- Trevor Moore, member of sketch comedy troupe The Whitest Kids U' Know
- Jonas Sanker, professional football safety for New Orleans Saints
- Lindsay Shoop, Olympic gold medal-winning rower
- Ben Bailey, American astronaut candidate
