= Charlottesville, Virginia =

- Independent city
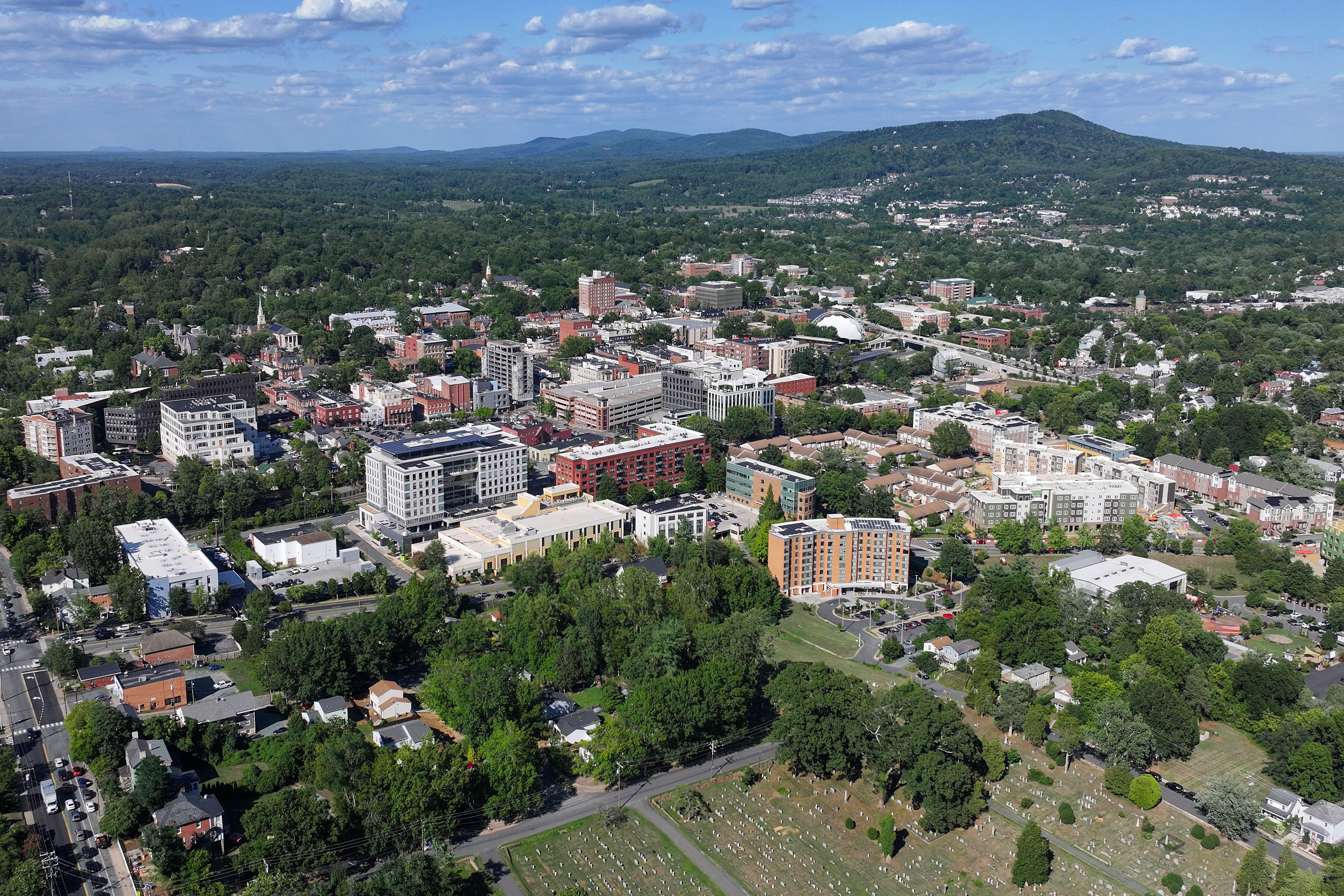
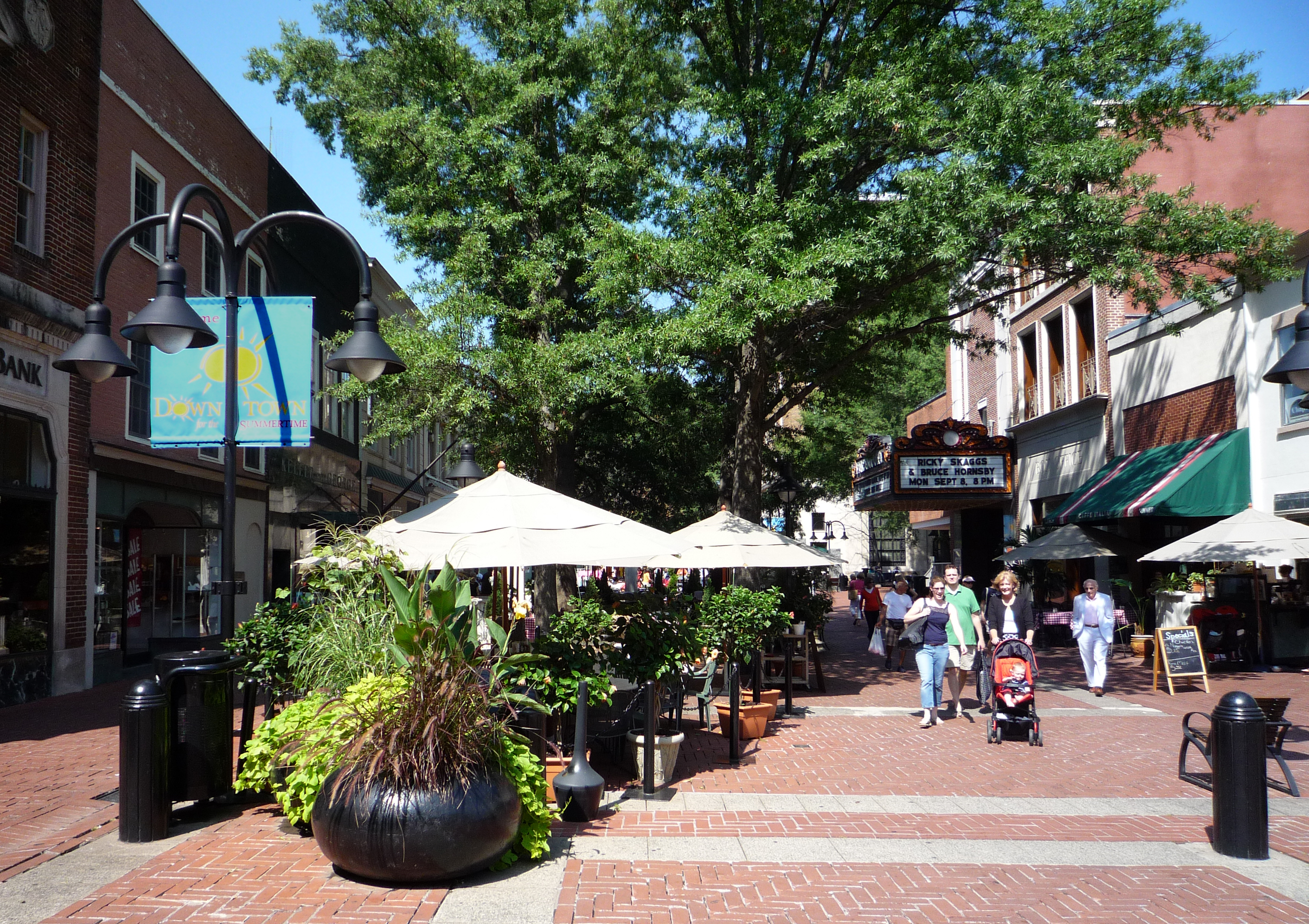
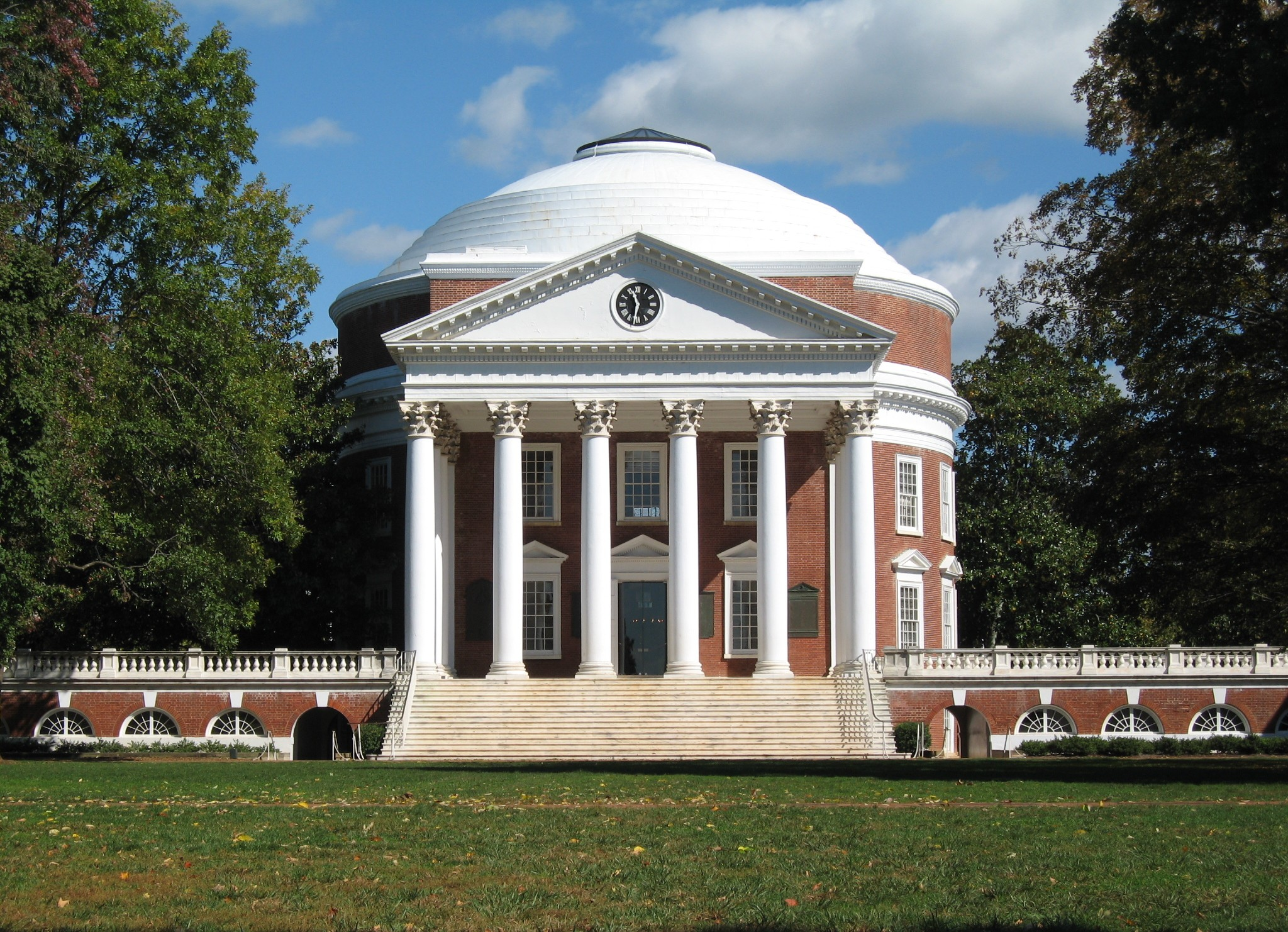
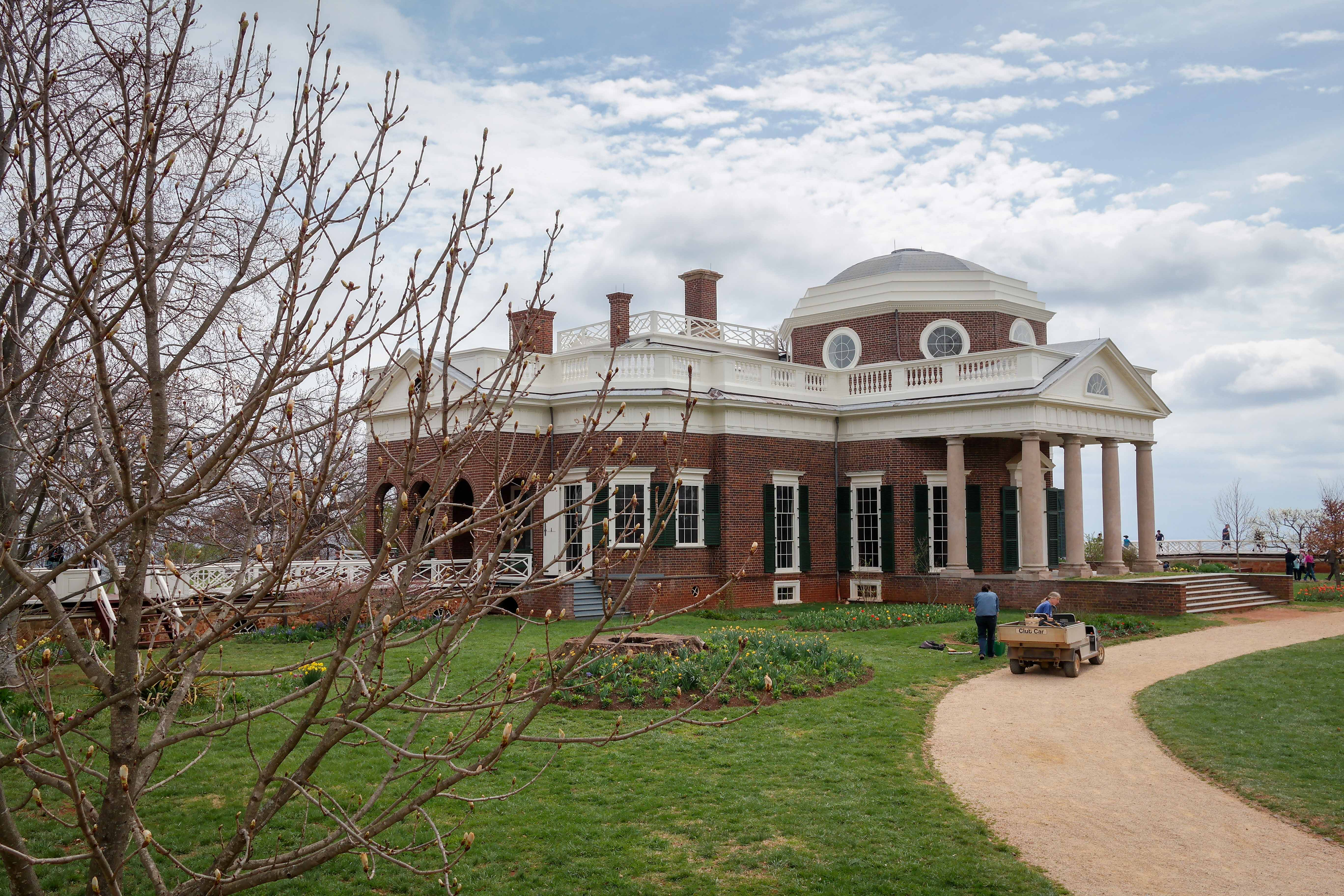
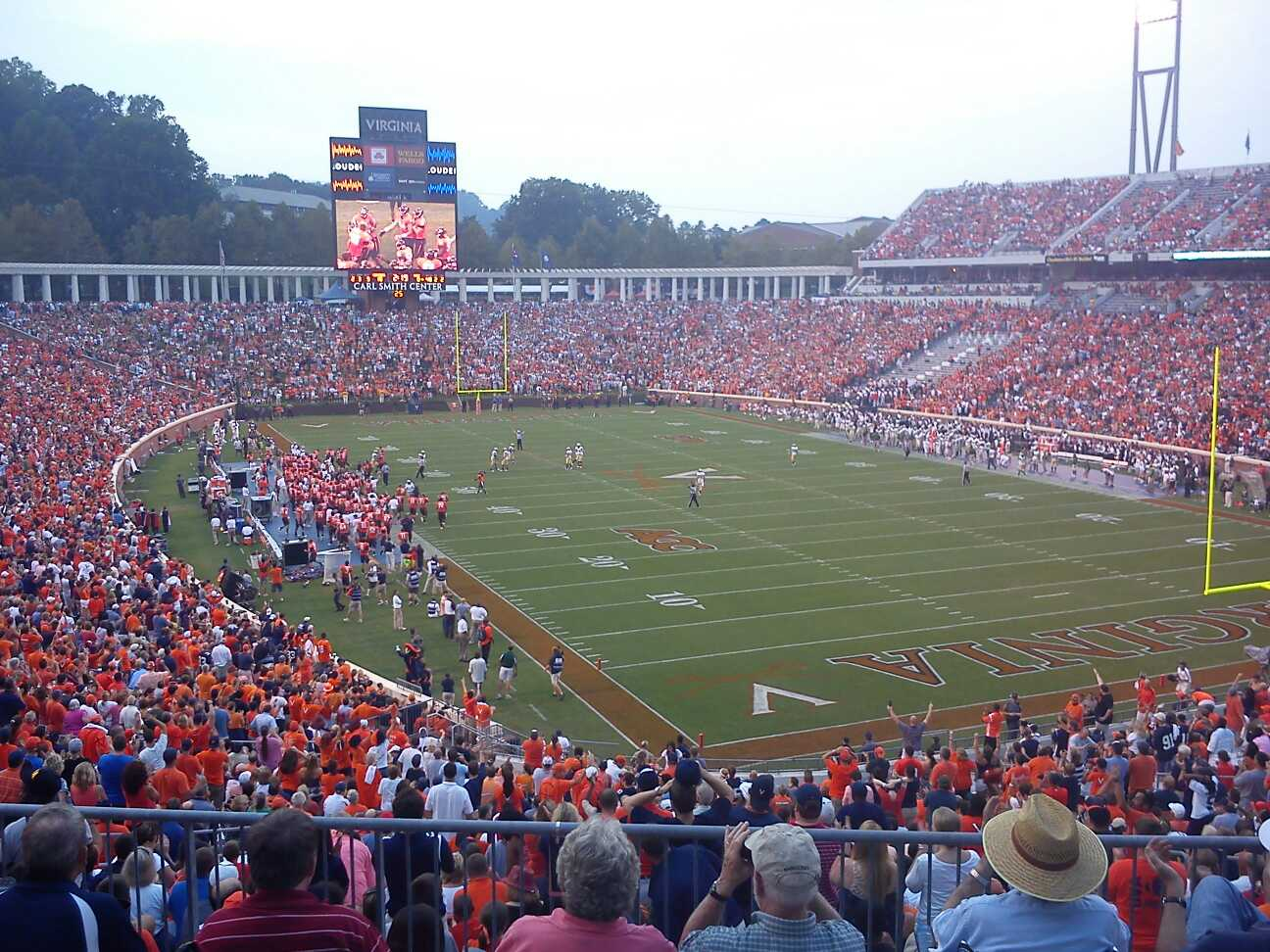
- Skyline of Charlottesville Downtown Mall University of Virginia Monticello Scott Stadium

- Seal
- Nicknames: C'ville, Hoo-Ville
- Motto: A great place to live for all of our citizens.
- Interactive map of Charlottesville, Virginia
- Location within Virginia Location within the United States
- Coordinates: 38°1′48″N 78°28′44″W
- Country: United States
- State: Virginia
- County: None (Independent city)
- Founded: 1762
- Named for: Charlotte of Mecklenburg-Strelitz

Government
  - Type: Council–manager
  - Mayor: Juandiego Wade (D)
  - City manager: Samuel Sanders, Jr.

Area
  - Independent city: 10.27 sq mi (26.60 km^{2})
  - Land: 10.25 sq mi (26.55 km^{2})
  - Water: 0.019 sq mi (0.05 km^{2})
- Elevation: 594 ft (181 m)

Population (2020)
  - Independent city: 46,553
  - Estimate (2025): 44,388 ▼
  - Density: 4,541.3/sq mi (1,753.41/km^{2})
  - Metro: 221,524 (209th)
- Demonym: Charlottesvillian
- Time zone: UTC−5 (EST)
  - Summer (DST): UTC−4 (EDT)
- ZIP Codes: 22901–22908
- Area code: 434
- FIPS code: 51-14968
- GNIS feature ID: 1498463
- Waterways: Rivanna River
- Public transit: Charlottesville Area Transit, University Transit Service, JAUNT
- Rail service: Cardinal, Crescent, Northeast Regional
- Airport: Charlottesville-Albemarle
- Website: charlottesville.gov

Charlottesville (Note: pronounced: /ˈʃɑːrlətsvɪl/ SHAR-ləts-vil), colloquially known as C'ville, (Note: Pronounced /ˈsivɪl/ SEE-vil) is an independent city in Virginia, United States. It is the county seat of Albemarle County, which surrounds the city, though the two are separate legal entities. The former capital of Virginia, it is named after Queen Charlotte. At the 2020 census, the city's population was 46,553. The Bureau of Economic Analysis combines the City of Charlottesville with Albemarle County for statistical purposes, bringing its population to approximately 160,000. Charlottesville is the heart of the Charlottesville metropolitan area, which includes Albemarle, Fluvanna, Greene, and Nelson counties.

Charlottesville was the home of two U.S. presidents, Thomas Jefferson and James Monroe. During their terms as Governors of Virginia, they lived in Albemarle County and traveled to and from Richmond, along the 71-mile historic Three Notch'd Road. Orange, located 26 miles (42 km) northeast of the city, was the hometown of President James Madison. The University of Virginia, founded by Jefferson, straddles the city's southwestern border. Jefferson's home and primary plantation, Monticello, located 3 miles (5 km) southeast of the city, is, along with the University of Virginia’s Academical Village, a UNESCO World Heritage Site, each attracting thousands of tourists from across the country every year.

== History ==
At the time of European settlement, part of the area that became Charlottesville was occupied by a Monacan village called Monasukapanough. They were pushed off their land by English settlers and were forced to disperse to North Carolina, Tennessee and possibly as far as Canada.

=== Founding ===
An Act of the Assembly of Albemarle County established Charlottesville in 1762. Thomas Walker was named its first trustee. It was situated along a trade route called Three Notched Road (present day U.S. Route 250), which led from Richmond to the Great (Shenandoah) Valley. The town took its name from the British queen Charlotte of Mecklenburg-Strelitz.

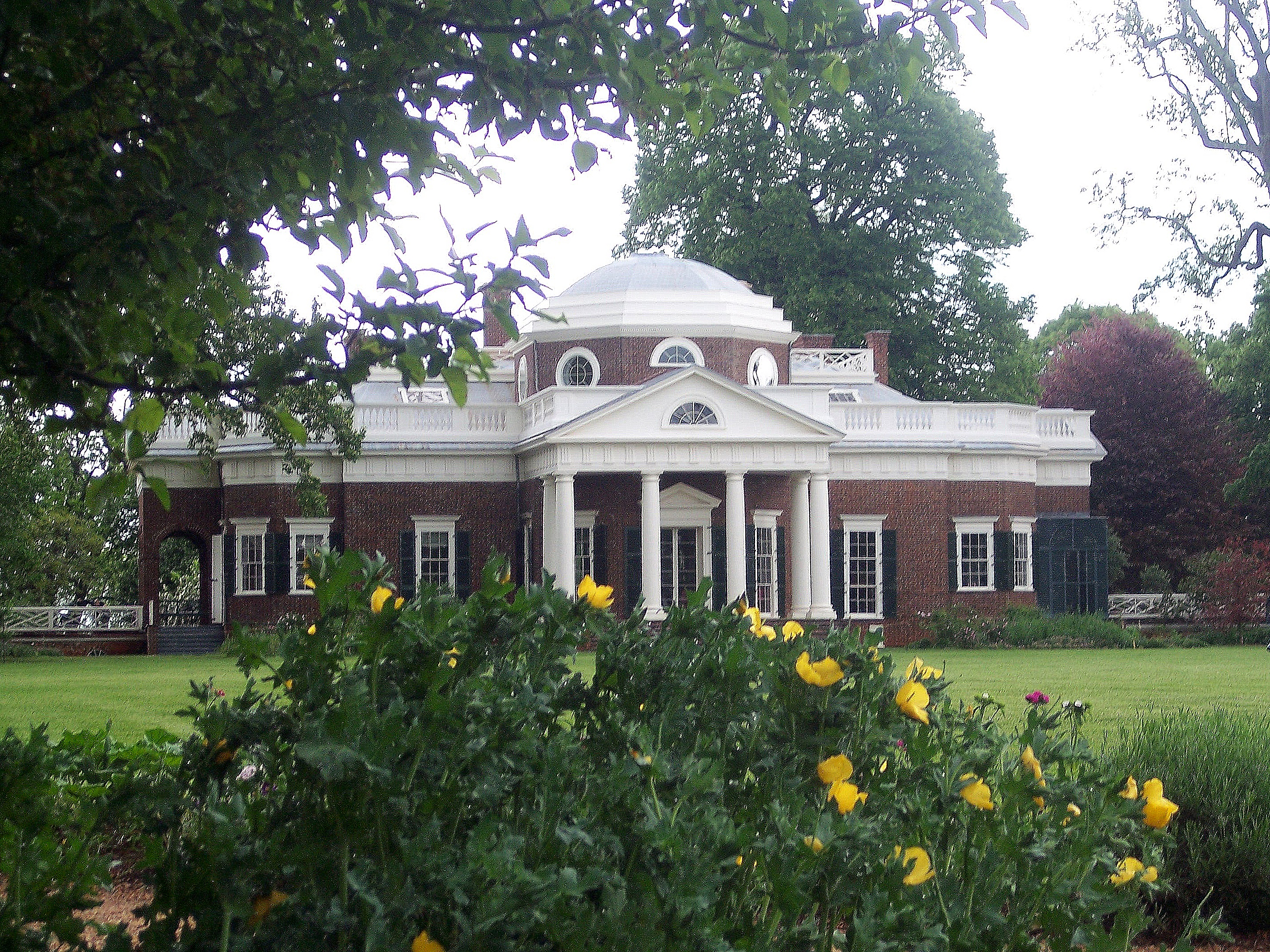
View of Monticello from its gardens

During the American Revolutionary War, Congress imprisoned the Convention Army in Charlottesville at the Albemarle Barracks between 1779 and 1781. The Governor and legislators had to abandon the capitol temporarily and on June 4, 1781, Jack Jouett warned the Virginia Legislature meeting at Monticello of a planned raid by Colonel Banastre Tarleton, allowing a narrow escape.

=== Civil War and Reconstruction ===
Unlike much of Virginia, Charlottesville was spared the brunt of the American Civil War. The only battle to take place in Charlottesville was the skirmish at Rio Hill, an encounter in which George Armstrong Custer briefly engaged local Confederate Home Guards before retreating. A year later, the Charlottesville Factory, founded c. 1820–1830, was accidentally burnt during General Philip Sheridan's 1865 raid through the Shenandoah Valley. However, the mayor had surrendered the city to Generals Custer and Sheridan to keep the town from being burned. The factory had been taken over by the Confederacy and used to manufacture woolen clothing for the soldiers. It caught fire when some coals taken by Union troops to burn the nearby railroad bridge dropped on the floor. The factory was rebuilt immediately and was known as the Woolen Mills until its liquidation in 1962.

=== Segregation and Jim Crow laws ===
After Reconstruction ended, Charlottesville's African American population suffered under Jim Crow laws that segregated public places and limited opportunity. Schools were racially segregated and African Americans were not served in many local businesses. Public parks were planned separately for the white and African American populations: four for whites, and one for African Americans built on the site of a former dump. The Ku Klux Klan had chapters in the Charlottesville area beginning at least in the early twentieth century, and events such as lynchings and cross burnings occurred in the Charlottesville area. In 1898, Charlottesville resident John Henry James was lynched in the nearby town of Ivy. In August 1950, three white men were observed burning a cross on Cherry Avenue, a street in a mostly African-American neighborhood in Charlottesville. It was speculated that the cross burning might be a reaction to "a white man [who] had been known to socialize with one of the young Negro women in that vicinity." In 1956, crosses were burned outside a progressive church.

In 1947, Charlottesville organized a local NAACP branch. In 2001, the Charlottesville and Albemarle Branches of the NAACP merged to form the Albemarle-Charlottesville NAACP Branch.

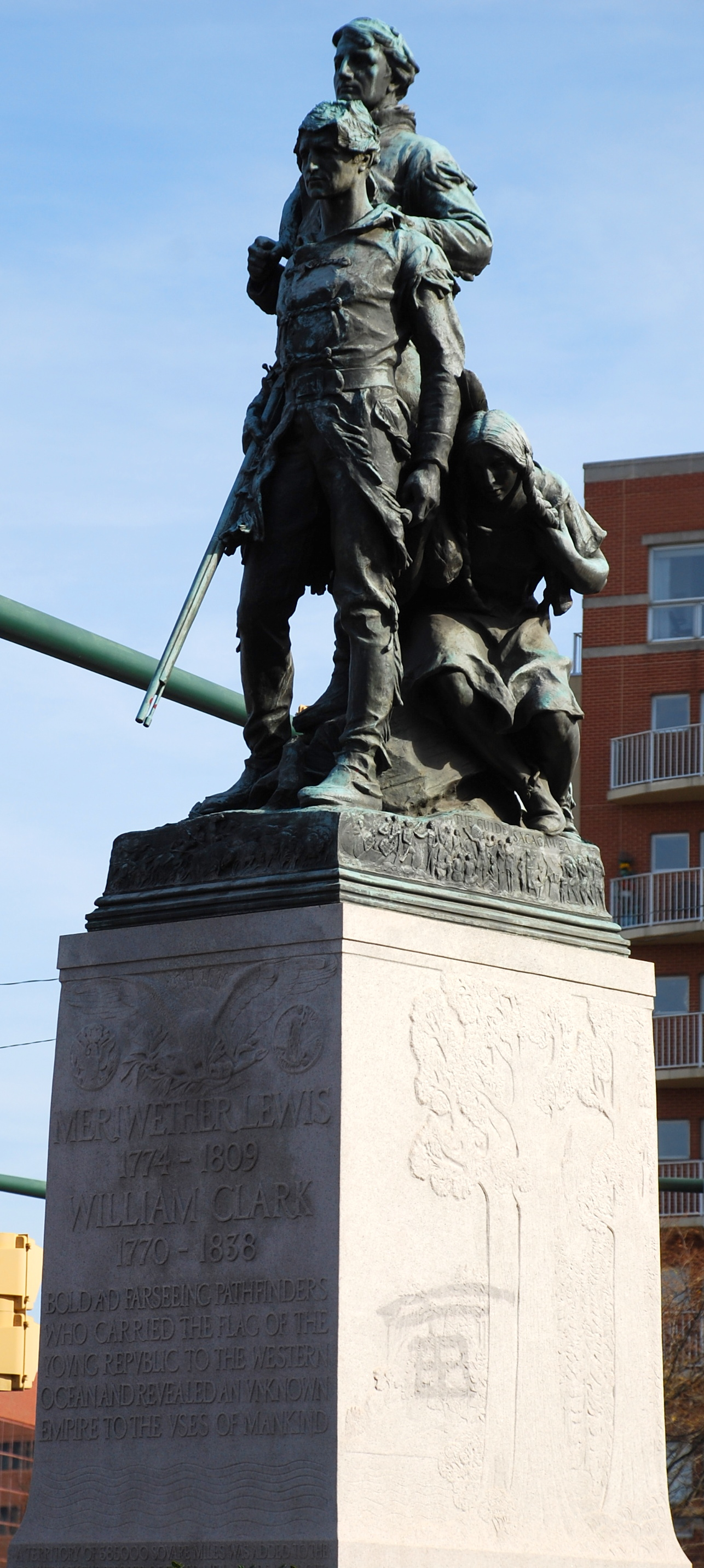
Statue of Lewis and Clark (now removed by the city).

In the fall of 1958, Charlottesville closed its segregated white schools as part of Virginia's strategy of massive resistance to federal court orders requiring integration as part of the implementation of the Supreme Court of the United States decision Brown v. Board of Education. The closures were required by a new series of state laws collectively known as the Stanley Plan, which prohibited and denied funding to integrated public schools. Segregated schools remained open, however. The first African-American member of the Charlottesville School Board was Raymond Bell in 1963.

In 1963, later than many Southern cities, civil rights activists in Charlottesville began protesting segregated restaurants with sit-ins, such as one that occurred at Buddy's Restaurant near the University of Virginia.

=== Destruction of Vinegar Hill ===
In 1965, the city government razed the downtown African American neighborhood Vinegar Hill as an urban renewal project, after the city council passed a law stating that "unsanitary and unsafe" properties could be taken over by a housing authority. Vinegar Hill had served the needs of the black community while the city remained segregated. One hundred thirty homes, five Black-owned businesses, and a church were destroyed. Many displaced community members moved into the Westhaven public housing project. The land was not redeveloped until the late 1970s.

Despite razing this small area comprising about 20 acres abutting West Main Street in the city's commercial downtown area, Charlottesville maintained its vibrant black community spanning the much larger and still extant Ridge Street and Fifeville neighborhoods to the south, and the Tenth & Page and Rose Hill neighborhoods to the north. Neighborhood civic associations, social clubs, and church groups sponsored activities for its residents. The Blue Mints Social Club met at the home of Mrs. Reva Shelton on December 1, 1974. At this meeting, the group planned their annual "Baskets of Cheer", and hosted a Cabaret Dance on New Year's Eve at Carver Recreation Center, with the Randolph Brothers performing. In 1974, other social clubs listed are the Bethune Art and Literary Club, The Lucky Twenty Club, and the Les Amies Club.

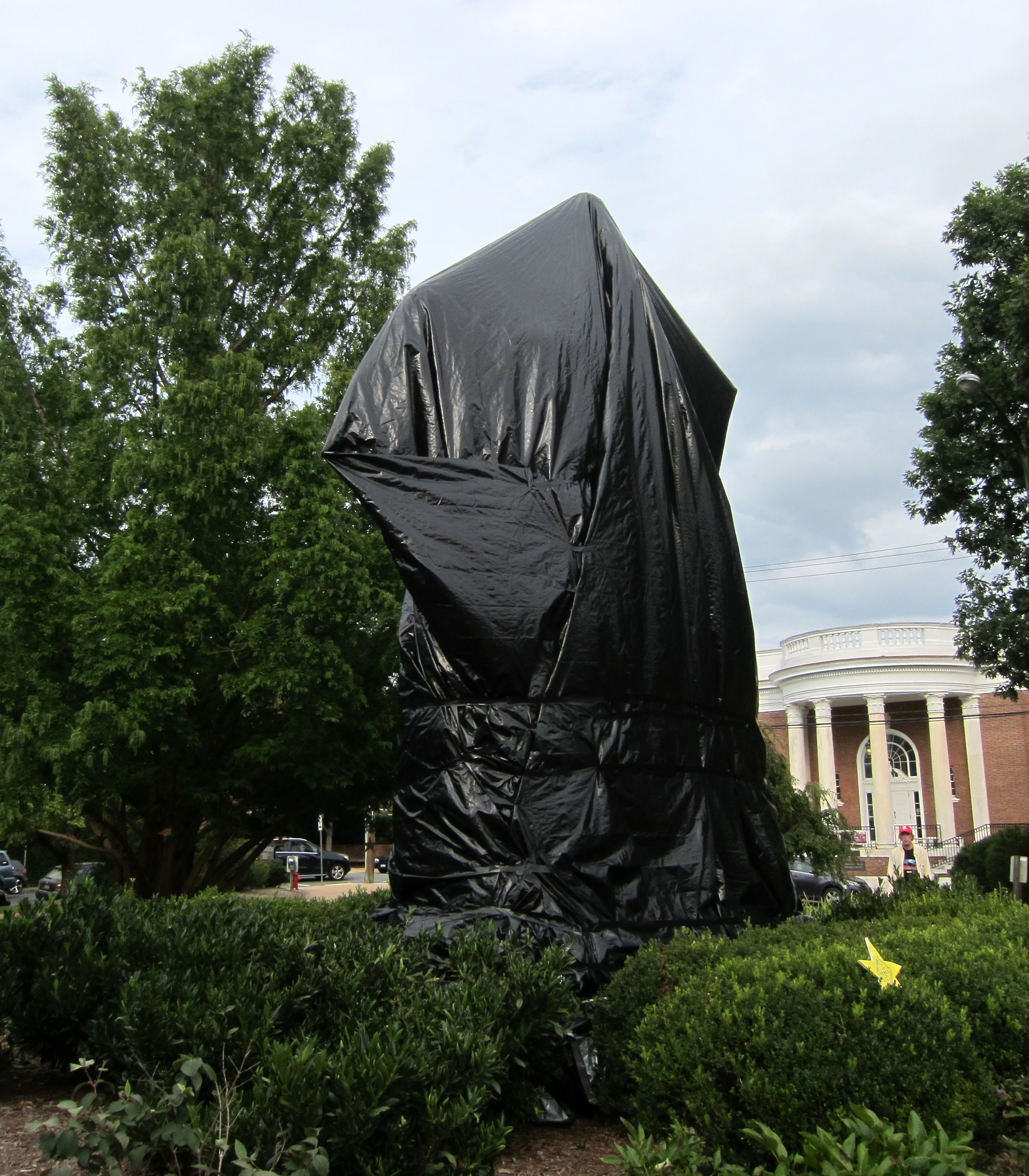
Lee sculpture covered in black tarp following the Unite the Right rally of 2017 (now removed by the city).

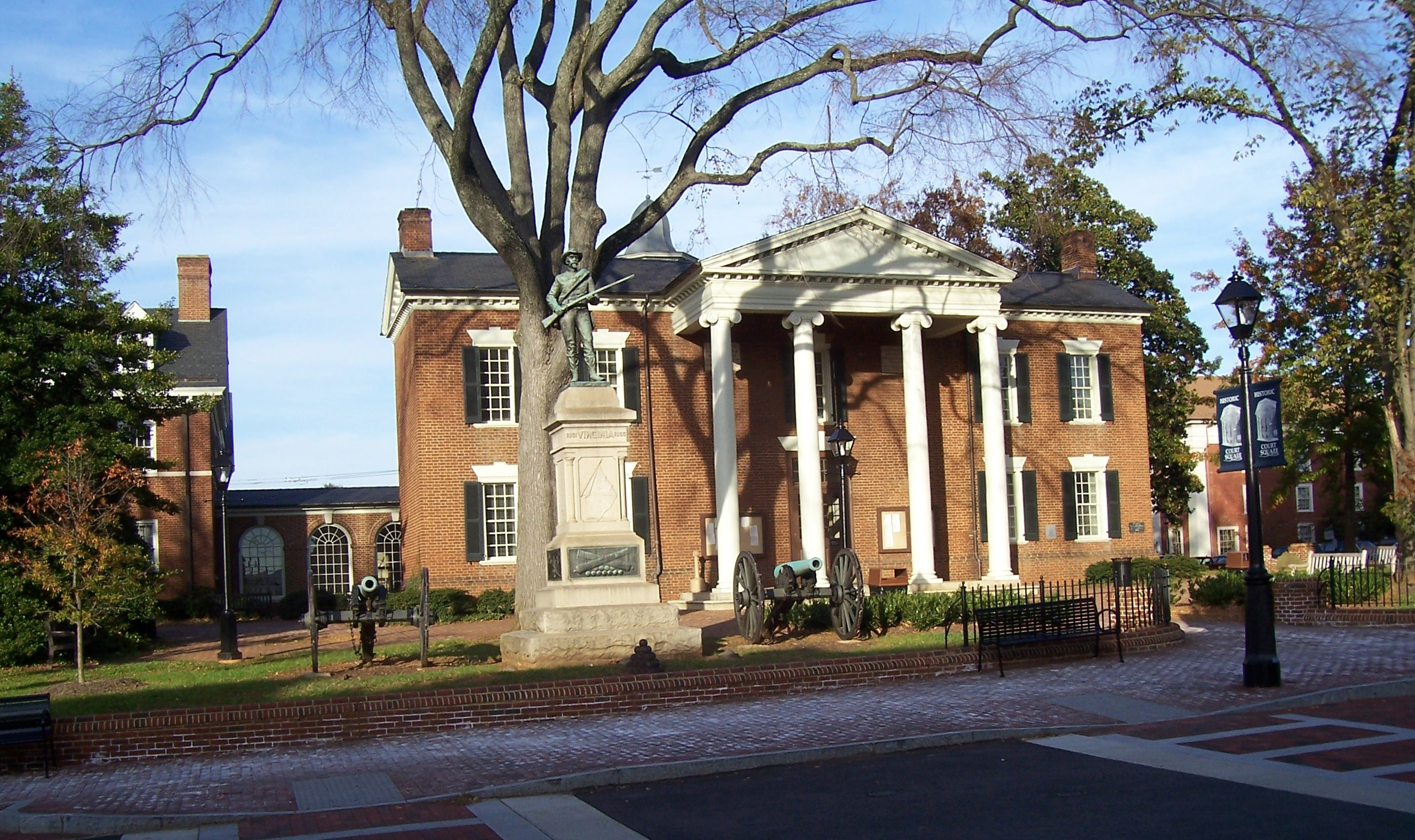
Court Square and Confederate statue (now removed by the city).

=== Conflict over Confederate symbols ===
Starting in the 2010s Charlottesville received national attention because of local conflict between those who did and those who did not want Confederate symbols removed. The Washington Post has reported that "Nowhere has this clash been more fraught than in Charlottesville, where parks have been renamed, then renamed again, streets have been re-christened, and stickers bearing white supremacist slogans go up as quickly as activists can remove them."

City attempts to remove statues of Robert E. Lee and Stonewall Jackson from downtown parks have been the subject of extensive, unresolved litigation. The movement to remove the statues gained traction when, in 2016, local high school student Zyahna Bryant authored a petition calling on city government to remove the Lee statue and rename the park. In August 2017, white supremacist groups opposed to their removal organized the "Unite the Right rally" to protest against the removal of the Robert E. Lee statue from then Lee Park, subsequently renamed Emancipation Park. After the rally, a white nationalist drove a car into protesters, resulting in the death of counter-protester Heather Heyer and causing injuries to 19 other counter-protesters. The incident became national news and Charlottesville became a symbol of political turbulence nationwide. The "Unite the Right Rally" is credited as being a significant catalyst in US political violence and reportedly represented a growing presence of far-right and white supremacist violence. The city succeeded in the removal of the Lee and Jackson statues on July 10, 2021, in addition to a statue of Meriwether Lewis, William Clark and Sacagawea of the Lewis and Clark Expedition.

=== Religious history ===
Christ Episcopal Church was Charlottesville's first church. It was begun in 1820 by builders on loan from Thomas Jefferson, and the congregation's current home was completed in the early 1900s.

The first black church in Charlottesville, the First Baptist Church of Charlottesville, was established in 1864. Previously, it was illegal for African Americans to have their own churches, although they were allowed to worship in designated areas in white churches, if the white church members allowed it. Its first black pastor (previously, it was required by law that all churches have white pastors), was William D. Gibbons. The date he became pastor is not known with certainty, but was about 1868. A current predominantly African-American church can trace its lineage to that first church.

Congregation Beth Israel's 1882 building is the oldest synagogue building still standing in Virginia.

In 1974, some of the Baptist churches in Charlottesville included the Union Run Baptist Church, the South Garden Baptist Church, and the Ebenezer Baptist Church.

The first Catholic church in Charlottesville was the Church of the Paraclete, built in 1880 and erected as a parish in 1896. In 1906 the church building was renovated and the parish was renamed to Holy Comforter. A second parish was erected for the growing Catholic population in 1976 called the Church of the Incarnation. In 1967 a Dominican-run parish for Catholic students at the University of Virginia was dedicated (replacing a Newman Center begun in 1943), and named St. Thomas Aquinas University Parish. The first Mass of record in Charlottesville was celebrated in the parlor of F. M. Paoli's residence, presumably on Random Row, now West Main Street. Services were held for about 12 years after that in the Town Hall. The presiders were priests who came from St. Francis Assisi Church in Staunton and then traveled on to other missions in the area.

== Geography ==
According to the United States Census Bureau, the city has a total area of 10.3 square miles (27 km^{2}), virtually all of which is land. Charlottesville is located in central Virginia along the Rivanna River—a tributary of the James—just west of the Southwest Mountains, a range which parallels the Blue Ridge about 20 miles (32 km) to the west. Charlottesville is 99 miles (159 km) from Washington, D.C., and 72 miles (116 km) from Richmond. Charlottesville exists on rolling hills between the University of Virginia to its west and Rivanna River to its east.

=== Climate ===
Charlottesville has a four-season humid subtropical climate (Köppen Cfa), with all months being well-watered, though the period from May to September is the wettest. Winters are somewhat cool, with a January average of 36.2 °F (2.3 °C), though lows can fall into the teens (< −7 °C) on some nights and highs frequently (11 days in January) reach 50 °F (10 °C). Spring and autumn provide transitions of reasonable length. Summers are hot and humid, with July averaging 77.6 °F (25.3 °C) and the high exceeding 90 °F (32 °C) on 34.4 or more days per year. Snowfall is highly variable from year to year but is normally moderate, averaging 17.0 inches (43 cm). What does fall does not remain on the ground for long. Extremes have ranged from −10 °F (−23 °C) on January 19, 1994, up to 107 °F (42 °C), most recently on September 7, 1954.

Climate data for Charlottesville, Virginia (Leander McCormick Observatory), 1991–2020 normals, extremes 1893–present
Month	Jan	Feb	Mar	Apr	May	Jun	Jul	Aug	Sep	Oct	Nov	Dec	Year
Record high °F (°C)	81 (27)	84 (29)	94 (34)	98 (37)	100 (38)	105 (41)	107 (42)	107 (42)	107 (42)	98 (37)	88 (31)	83 (28)	107 (42)
Mean daily maximum °F (°C)	44.7 (7.1)	48.7 (9.3)	56.5 (13.6)	68.3 (20.2)	75.4 (24.1)	83.1 (28.4)	87.4 (30.8)	85.6 (29.8)	79.2 (26.2)	68.5 (20.3)	57.7 (14.3)	48.1 (8.9)	66.9 (19.4)
Daily mean °F (°C)	36.2 (2.3)	39.1 (3.9)	46.4 (8.0)	57.1 (13.9)	65.4 (18.6)	73.5 (23.1)	77.6 (25.3)	75.9 (24.4)	69.4 (20.8)	58.7 (14.8)	48.5 (9.2)	40.0 (4.4)	57.3 (14.1)
Mean daily minimum °F (°C)	27.7 (−2.4)	29.5 (−1.4)	36.3 (2.4)	45.9 (7.7)	55.4 (13.0)	63.8 (17.7)	67.9 (19.9)	66.3 (19.1)	59.6 (15.3)	48.9 (9.4)	39.3 (4.1)	31.9 (−0.1)	47.7 (8.7)
Record low °F (°C)	−10 (−23)	−9 (−23)	7 (−14)	14 (−10)	32 (0)	40 (4)	49 (9)	44 (7)	34 (1)	26 (−3)	8 (−13)	−3 (−19)	−10 (−23)
Average precipitation inches (mm)	3.42 (87)	2.97 (75)	3.96 (101)	3.48 (88)	4.63 (118)	4.68 (119)	4.84 (123)	4.02 (102)	5.21 (132)	3.92 (100)	3.65 (93)	3.75 (95)	48.53 (1,233)
Average snowfall inches (cm)	3.9 (9.9)	5.9 (15)	3.8 (9.7)	0.0 (0.0)	0.0 (0.0)	0.0 (0.0)	0.0 (0.0)	0.0 (0.0)	0.0 (0.0)	0.0 (0.0)	0.2 (0.51)	3.2 (8.1)	17.0 (43)
Average precipitation days (≥ 0.01 in)	9.6	8.6	10.6	11.7	13.1	11.7	12.2	11.3	10.2	9.0	8.4	9.9	126.3
Average snowy days (≥ 0.1 in)	2.2	2.2	1.4	0.1	0.0	0.0	0.0	0.0	0.0	0.0	0.2	1.5	7.6
Source: NOAA

Climate data for Charlottesville–Albemarle Airport, Virginia (1991–2020 normals, extremes 1893–present (Note: Threaded records maintained at the "Charlottesville 2W" (Leander McCormick Observatory) from January 1893 to November 13, 1998, and at Charlottesville–Albemarle Airport since November 14, 1998.))
Month	Jan	Feb	Mar	Apr	May	Jun	Jul	Aug	Sep	Oct	Nov	Dec	Year
Record high °F (°C)	81 (27)	84 (29)	94 (34)	98 (37)	100 (38)	105 (41)	107 (42)	107 (42)	107 (42)	98 (37)	88 (31)	80 (27)	107 (42)
Mean daily maximum °F (°C)	47.3 (8.5)	51.4 (10.8)	59.6 (15.3)	70.3 (21.3)	77.5 (25.3)	85.6 (29.8)	89.7 (32.1)	87.3 (30.7)	81.0 (27.2)	70.6 (21.4)	59.7 (15.4)	50.7 (10.4)	69.2 (20.7)
Daily mean °F (°C)	38.4 (3.6)	41.4 (5.2)	48.7 (9.3)	58.5 (14.7)	66.6 (19.2)	74.8 (23.8)	79.0 (26.1)	76.9 (24.9)	70.4 (21.3)	59.3 (15.2)	49.1 (9.5)	41.5 (5.3)	58.7 (14.8)
Mean daily minimum °F (°C)	29.5 (−1.4)	31.3 (−0.4)	37.7 (3.2)	46.6 (8.1)	55.6 (13.1)	64.0 (17.8)	68.3 (20.2)	66.5 (19.2)	59.7 (15.4)	47.9 (8.8)	38.5 (3.6)	32.2 (0.1)	48.1 (8.9)
Record low °F (°C)	−10 (−23)	−9 (−23)	1 (−17)	14 (−10)	29 (−2)	40 (4)	49 (9)	44 (7)	34 (1)	25 (−4)	8 (−13)	−3 (−19)	−10 (−23)
Average precipitation inches (mm)	2.96 (75)	2.35 (60)	3.54 (90)	3.17 (81)	4.17 (106)	4.38 (111)	3.37 (86)	3.87 (98)	4.09 (104)	3.31 (84)	3.36 (85)	3.04 (77)	41.61 (1,057)
Average precipitation days (≥ 0.01 in)	9.0	7.8	10.0	10.9	13.5	11.8	13.1	11.4	10.9	8.9	7.5	9.3	124.1
Source: NOAA

== Demographics ==
Historical population
Census	Pop.	Note	%±
1870	2,838		—
1880	2,676		−5.7%
1890	5,591		108.9%
1900	6,449		15.3%
1910	6,765		4.9%
1920	10,688		58.0%
1930	15,245		42.6%
1940	19,400		27.3%
1950	25,969		33.9%
1960	29,427		13.3%
1970	38,880		32.1%
1980	39,916		2.7%
1990	40,341		1.1%
2000	45,049		11.7%
2010	43,475		−3.5%
2020	46,553		7.1%
2025 (est.)	44,388	▼	−4.7%
U.S. Decennial Census; 1790–1960 1900–1990; 1990–2000 2010–2015 2020

=== Racial and ethnic composition ===
Charlottesville city, Virginia – Racial and ethnic composition Note: the US Census treats Hispanic/Latino as an ethnic category. This table excludes Latinos from the racial categories and assigns them to a separate category. Hispanics/Latinos may be of any race.
Race / Ethnicity (NH = Non-Hispanic)	Pop 1980	Pop 1990	Pop 2000	Pop 2010	Pop 2020	% 1980	% 1990	% 2000	% 2010	% 2020
White alone (NH)	31,866	30,345	30,825	28,827	29,609	79.83%	75.22%	68.43%	66.31%	63.60%
Black or African American alone (NH)	7,153	8,520	9,916	8,344	7,030	17.92%	21.12%	22.01%	19.19%	15.10%
Native American or Alaska Native alone (NH)	26	38	42	65	66	0.07%	0.09%	0.09%	0.15%	0.14%
Asian alone (NH)	379	927	2,215	2,758	4,064	0.95%	2.30%	4.92%	6.34%	8.73%
Native Hawaiian or Pacific Islander alone (NH)	x	x	13	13	18	x	x	0.03%	0.03%	0.04%
Other race alone (NH)	116	35	89	89	218	0.29%	0.09%	0.20%	0.20%	0.47%
Mixed race or Multiracial (NH)	x	x	847	1,156	2,341	x	x	1.88%	2.66%	5.03%
Hispanic or Latino (any race)	376	476	1,102	2,223	3,207	0.94%	1.18%	2.45%	5.11%	6.89%
Total	39,916	40,341	45,049	43,475	46,553	100.00%	100.00%	100.00%	100.00%	100.00%

=== 2020 census ===
As of the 2020 census, Charlottesville had a population of 46,553 and a median age of 29.5 years; 16.5% of residents were under the age of 18 and 11.7% of residents were 65 years of age or older. For every 100 females there were 91.2 males, and for every 100 females age 18 and over there were 88.8 males age 18 and over.

There were 19,769 households in Charlottesville, of which 21.9% had children under the age of 18 living in them. Of all households, 30.2% were married-couple households, 26.1% were households with a male householder and no spouse or partner present, and 36.3% were households with a female householder and no spouse or partner present. About 37.0% of all households were made up of individuals and 8.7% had someone living alone who was 65 years of age or older.

There were 21,413 housing units, of which 7.7% were vacant. The homeowner vacancy rate was 1.4% and the rental vacancy rate was 4.2%.

100.0% of residents lived in urban areas, while 0.0% lived in rural areas.

Racial composition as of the 2020 census
Race	Number	Percent
White	30,344	65.2%
Black or African American	7,122	15.3%
American Indian and Alaska Native	164	0.4%
Asian	4,083	8.8%
Native Hawaiian and Other Pacific Islander	22	0.0%
Some other race	1,235	2.7%
Two or more races	3,583	7.7%
Hispanic or Latino (of any race)	3,207	6.9%

=== 2010 Census ===
As of the census of 2010, there were 43,475 people, 17,778 households, and 7,518 families residing in the city. The population density was 4,220.8 people per square mile (1,629.7 people/km^{2}). There were 19,189 housing units. The racial makeup of the city was 69.1% White, 19.4% Black American, 0.3% Native American, 6.4% Asian, 1.8% from other races, and 3.0% from two or more races. 5.1% of the population were Hispanics or Latinos of any race.

There were 17,778 households, out of which 17.9% had children under the age of 18 living with them, 28.1% were married couples living together, 11.3% had a female householder with no husband present, and 57.7% were non-families. 34.1% of all households were made up of individuals, and 7.5% had someone living alone who was 65 years of age or older. The average household size was 2.31 and the average family size was 2.91.

The age distribution was 14.9% under the age of 18, 24.3% from 18 to 24, 28.9% from 25 to 44, 18.8% from 45 to 64, and 9.2% who were 65 years of age or older. The median age was 27.8 years. The population was 52.3% female and 47.7% male. The city's low median age and the "bulge" in the 18-to-24 age group are both due to the presence of the University of Virginia.

The median income for a household in the city was $44,535, and the median income for a family was $63,934. The per capita income for the city was $26,049. About 10.5% of families and 27.3% of the population were below the poverty line, including 15.8% of those under age 18 and 7.9% of those age 65 or over.

20% of Charlottesville residents have a graduate or professional degree, compared with 10% in the United States as a whole.

Federally, Charlottesville is part of Virginia's 5th congressional district, represented by Republican John McGuire, elected in 2024.

== Economy ==
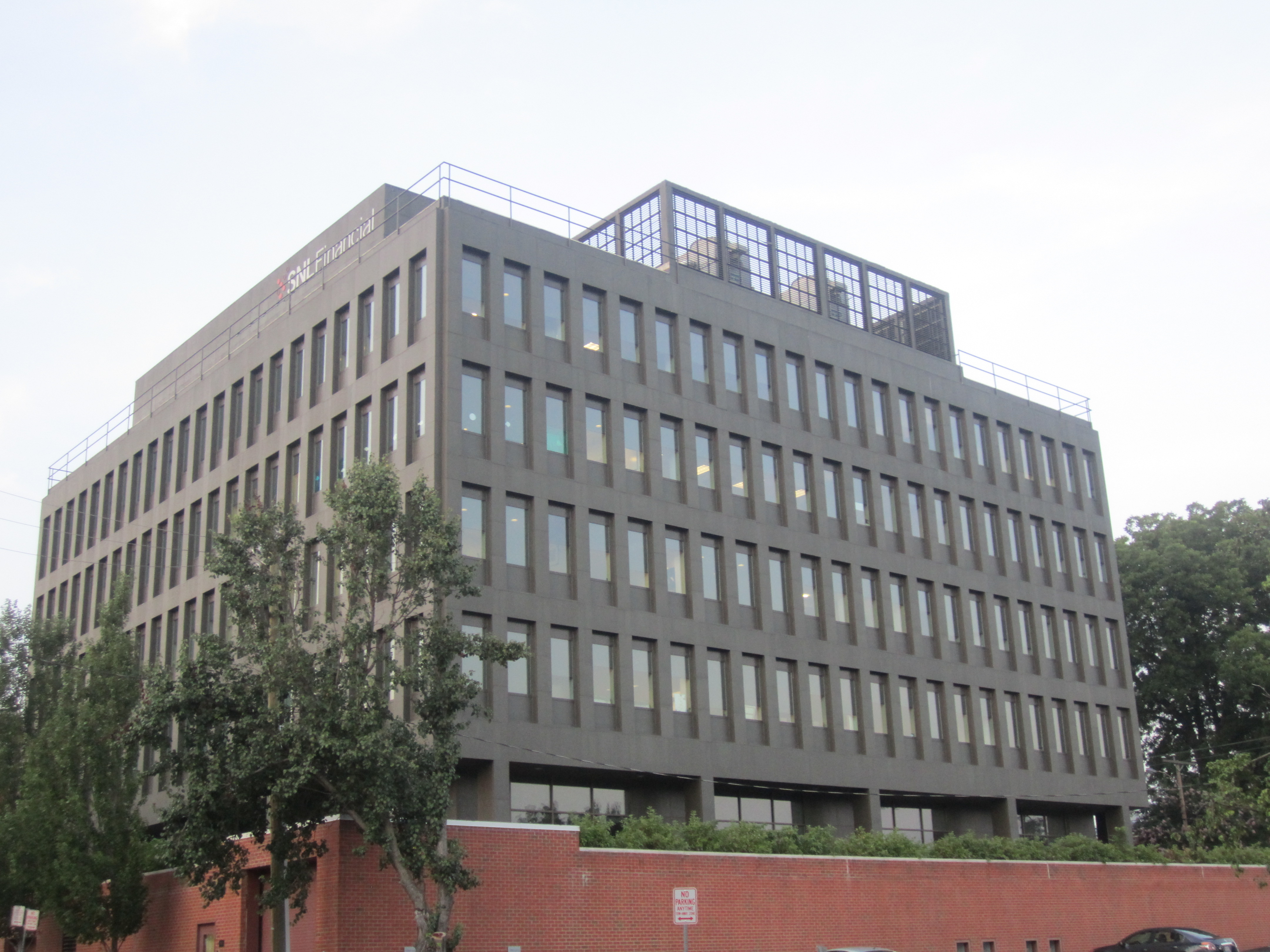
S&P Global building in Charlottesville

Charlottesville is the home of the National Radio Astronomy Observatory headquarters, the Leander McCormick Observatory and the CFA Institute. It is served by two area hospitals, the Martha Jefferson Hospital founded in 1903, and the University of Virginia Hospital. The National Ground Intelligence Center (NGIC) is in the Charlottesville area. Other large employers include Crutchfield, Emerson Automation Solutions, PepsiCo and S&P Global.

18% of people employed in Charlottesville live there, while 82% commute into the city. 42% of those commuting to Charlottesville live in Albemarle County. Additionally, 11,497 people commute from Charlottesville outside of the city for employment. 51% of those commuting from Charlottesville work in Albemarle County. In 2024, Charlottesville had a 3.1% unemployment rate.

=== Largest employers ===
According to the city's 2025 Comprehensive Annual Financial Report the largest employers in the city are as follows:

#	Employer	# of employees
1	University of Virginia / Blue Ridge Hospital	1,000+
2	UVA Health Services Foundation	1,000+
3	City of Charlottesville	1,000+
4	Charlottesville City School Board	1,000+
5	Servicelink Management Com Inc.	500–999
6	Morrison Crothall Support	250 to 499
7	County of Albemarle	250 to 499
8	ADP Totalsource	250 to 499
9	General Atomics	250 to 499
10	Integrity Cleaning Service LLC	250 to 499

== Attractions and culture ==
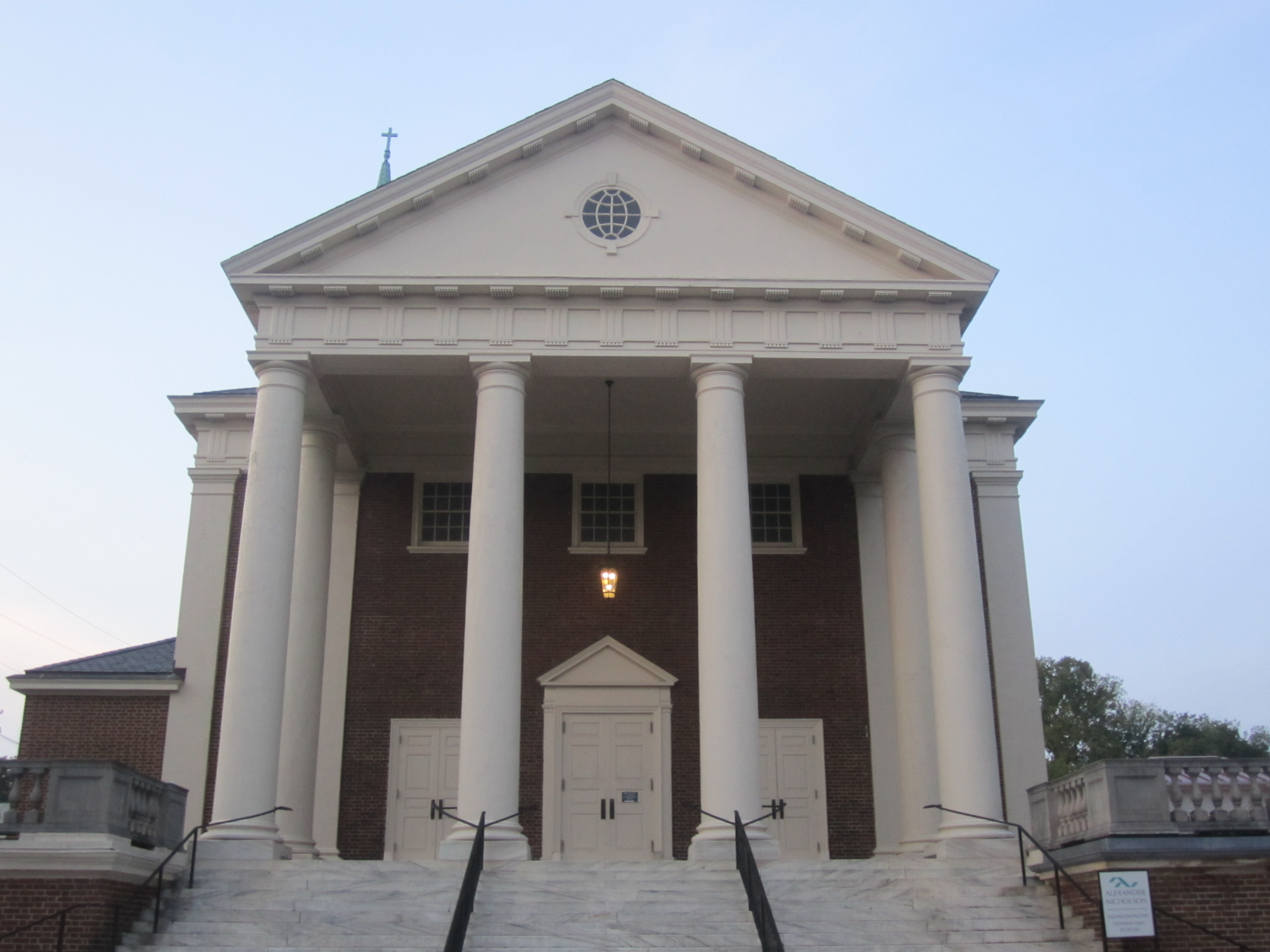
First United Methodist Church in the historic district of downtown Charlottesville (pictured July 2011) has since been renovated.

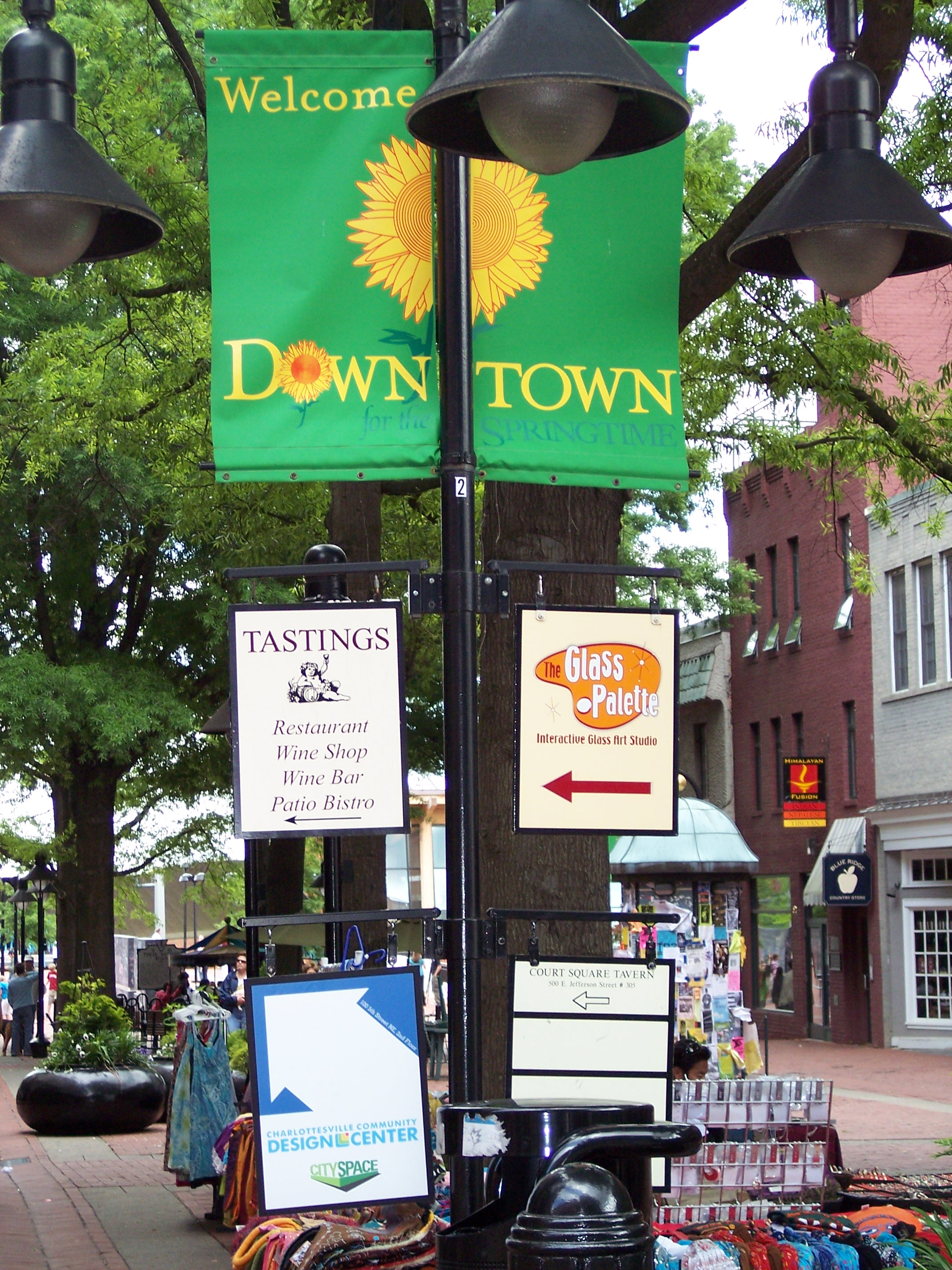
The Downtown Mall

Charlottesville has a large series of attractions and venues for its relatively small size. Visitors come to the area for wine and beer tours, ballooning, hiking, and world-class entertainment that perform at one of the area's four larger venues. The city is both the launching pad and home of the Dave Matthews Band as well as the center of a sizable indie music scene. Charlottesville hosts multiple orchestral groups including the Blue Ridge Chamber Orchestra, Youth Orchestras of Central Virginia, and the Charlottesville Symphony at the University of Virginia.

The Charlottesville area was the home of Thomas Jefferson, James Madison, and James Monroe. Monticello, Jefferson's plantation manor, is located just a few miles from downtown. The home of James Monroe, Ash Lawn-Highland, is down the road from Monticello. About 25 miles (40 km) northeast of Charlottesville lies the home of James and Dolley Madison, Montpelier. During the summer, the Ash Lawn-Highland Opera Festival is held at the downtown Paramount Theater with a performance at Ash Lawn-Highland.

The nearby Shenandoah National Park offers recreational activities, scenic mountains and hiking trails. Skyline Drive is a scenic drive that runs the length of the park, alternately winding through thick forest and emerging upon sweeping scenic overlooks. The Blue Ridge Parkway, a similar scenic drive that extends 469 miles (755 km) south to Great Smoky Mountains National Park in North Carolina, terminates at the southern entrance of Shenandoah, where it turns into Skyline Drive. This junction of the two scenic drives is only 22 miles (35 km) west of downtown Charlottesville.

Charlottesville's downtown is a center of business for Albemarle County. It is home to the Downtown Mall, one of the longest outdoor pedestrian malls in the nation, with stores, restaurants, theaters and civic attractions. The renovated Paramount Theater hosts various events, including Broadway shows and concerts. Local theatrics downtown includes Charlottesville's community theater Live Arts. Other attractions on the Downtown Mall are the Virginia Discovery Museum and a 3,500 seat outdoor amphitheater, the Ting Pavilion, formerly the Sprint Pavilion and the nTelos Wireless Pavilion. Court Square, just a few blocks from the Downtown Mall, is the original center of Charlottesville and several of the historic buildings there date back to the city's founding in 1762.

Charlottesville also is home to the University of Virginia (most of which is legally in Albemarle County). During the academic year, over 20,000 students enter Charlottesville to attend the university. Its main grounds are located on the west side of Charlottesville, with Thomas Jefferson's Academical Village, known as the Lawn, as the centerpiece. The Lawn is a long esplanade crowned by two prominent structures, The Rotunda (designed by Jefferson) and Old Cabell Hall (designed by Stanford White). Along the Lawn and the parallel Range are dormitory rooms reserved for distinguished students. The University Programs Council is a student-run body that programs concerts, comedy shows, speakers, and other events open to the students and the community. One block from The Rotunda, the University of Virginia Art Museum exhibits work drawn from its collection of more than 10,000 objects and special temporary exhibitions from sources nationwide. It is also home to the Judge Advocate General's Legal Center and School where all U.S. Army military lawyers, known as "JAGs", take courses specific to military law.

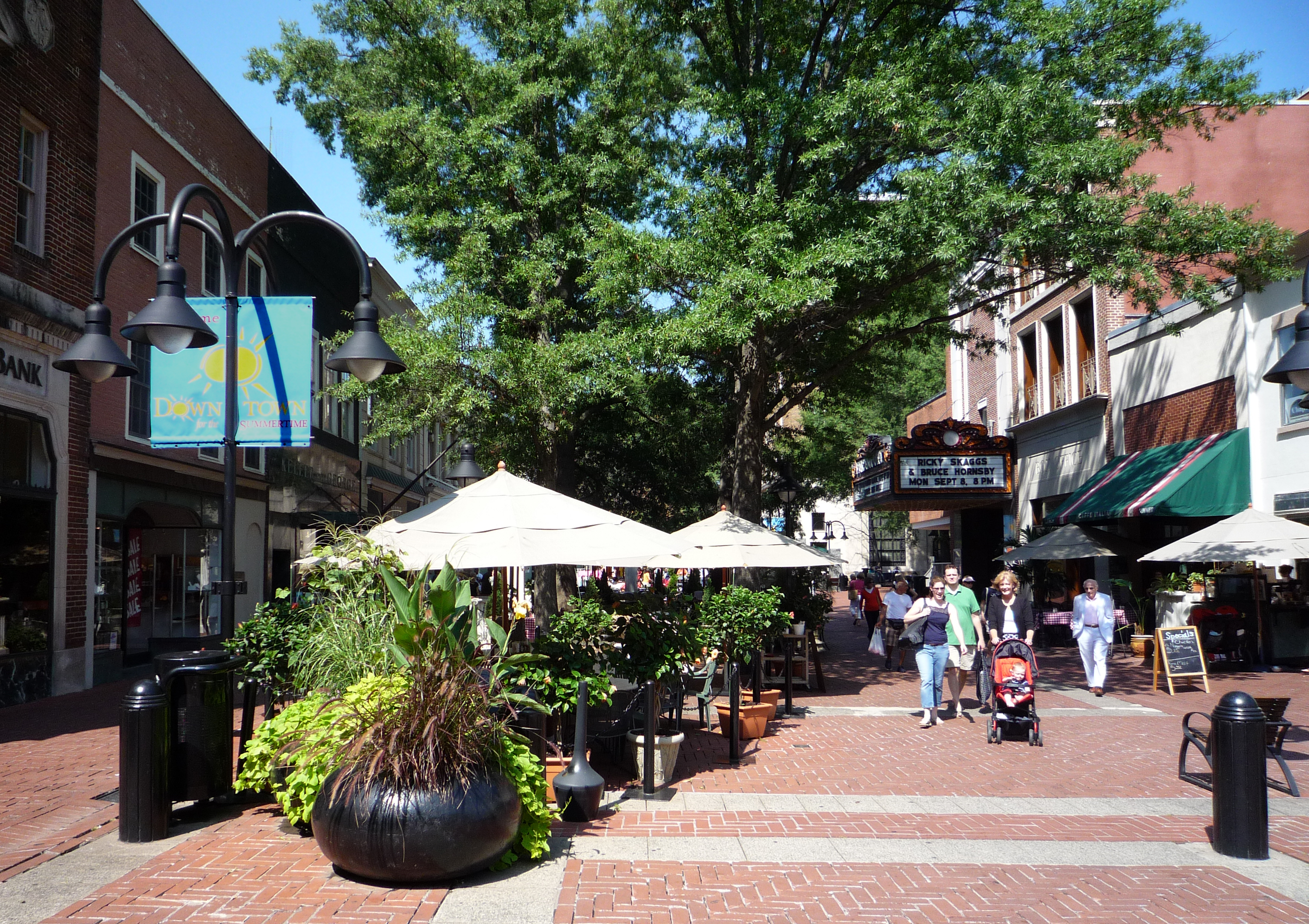
Downtown Mall

The Corner is the commercial district abutting the main grounds of the University of Virginia along University Avenue. This area is full of college bars, eateries, and University merchandise stores, and is busy with student activity during the school year. Pedestrian traffic peaks during the university's home football games and graduation ceremonies. Much of the university's Greek life is on the nearby Rugby Road, contributing to the nightlife and local bar scene. West Main Street, running from the Corner to the Downtown Mall, is a commercial district of restaurants, bars, and other businesses.

Charlottesville is host to the annual Virginia Festival of the Book in March, the Charlottesville Pride Festival in September, and the Virginia Film Festival in October. In addition, the Foxfield Races are steeplechase races held in April and September of each year. A Fourth of July celebration, including a naturalization ceremony, is held annually at Monticello, and a First Night celebration has been held on the Downtown Mall since 1982.

== Public Art and Murals ==
Charlottesville features dozens of public murals located across restaurants, community spaces, and streets in several neighborhoods. Many artworks were created through city art initiatives such as the Alexandria-based Tom Tom Founders Festival “City as Canvas” project, and the Paint & Poetry collaboration between the Charlottesville Mural Project and New City Arts Initiative.

== Sports ==
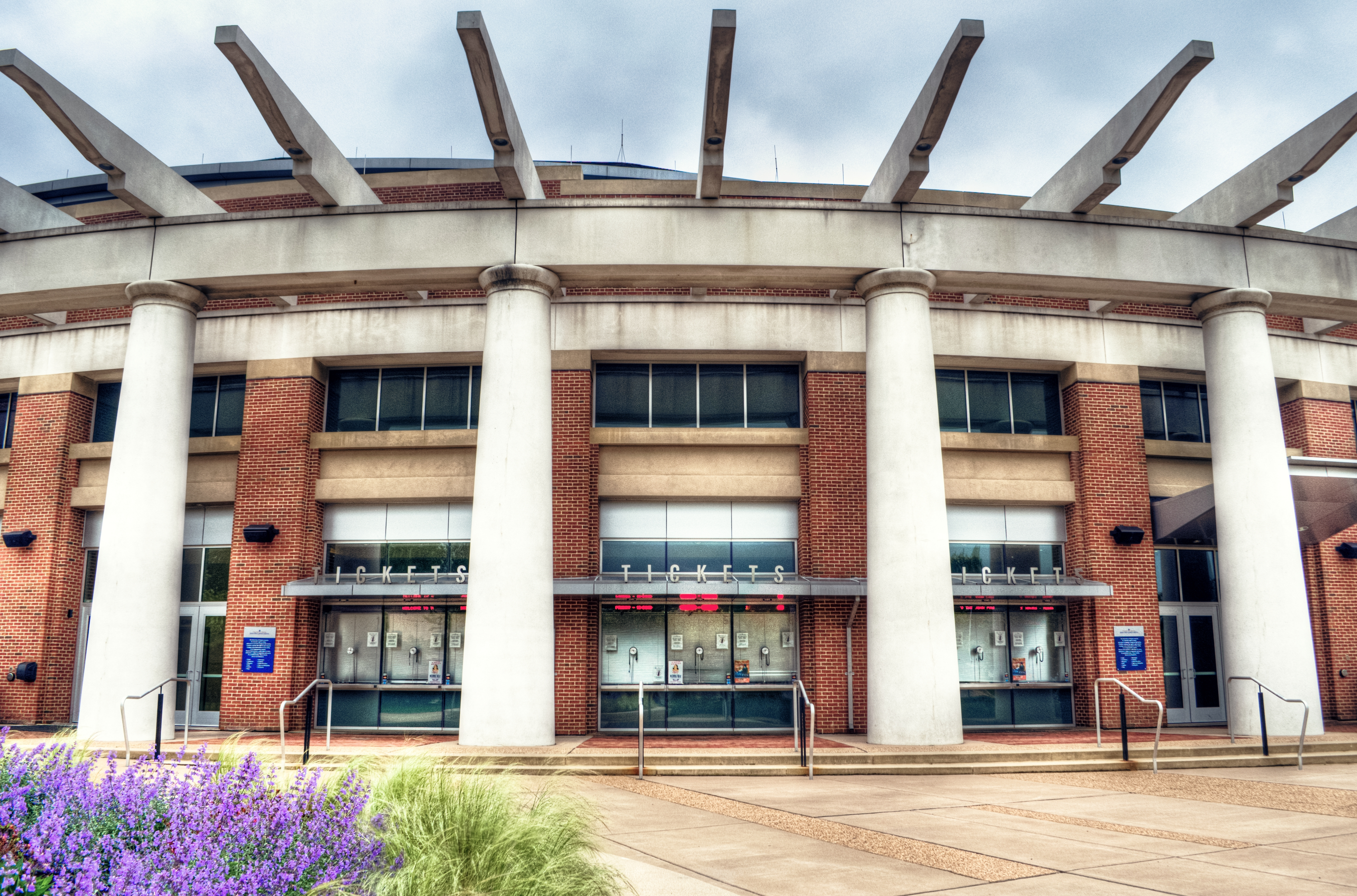
John Paul Jones Arena, home of the Virginia Cavaliers basketball programs.

Charlottesville has no professional sports teams, but is home to the University of Virginia's athletic teams, the Cavaliers, most notably the 2019 NCAA Men's National Basketball Champions. The Cavaliers have a wide fan base throughout the region and state. The Cavaliers field teams in sports from soccer to basketball, and have modern facilities that draw spectators throughout the year. Cavalier football season draws the largest crowds during the academic year, with football games played in Scott Stadium. The stadium hosted large musical events, including concerts by the Dave Matthews Band, The Rolling Stones and U2.

John Paul Jones Arena, which opened in 2006, is the home arena of the Cavalier basketball teams, in addition to serving as a site for concerts and other entertainment events. The arena seats 14,593 for basketball. In its first season in the new arena concluded in March 2007, the Virginia men's basketball team tied with UNC for 1st in the ACC. Virginia Cavaliers men's basketball won the ACC outright in the 2013–14 season, as well as the 2014 ACC tournament. The team finished the season ranked No. 3 in the AP poll before losing to Tom Izzo's Spartans by two points in the Sweet Sixteen held in Brooklyn, New York. The Cavaliers' men's basketball team won the NCAA championship on April 8, 2019.

Lacrosse has become a significant part of the Charlottesville sports scene. The Virginia Men's team won their first NCAA Championship in 1972; in 2006, they won their fourth national championship and were the first team to finish undefeated in 17 games (then a record for wins). The team won its seventh National Championship in 2021. Virginia's Women's team has three NCAA Championships to its credit, with wins in 1991, 1993, and 2004. The team most recently lost in 2023 semi finals to Notre Dame by a score of 13–12 in overtime on May 27, 2023.

The soccer program is also strong; the Men's team shared a national title with Santa Clara in 1989 and won an unprecedented four consecutive NCAA Division I Championships (1991–1994). Their coach during that period was Bruce Arena, who later won two MLS titles at D.C. United and coached the U.S. National Team during the 2002 and 2006 World Cups. The Virginia Men's soccer team won the NCAA Championship again in both 2009 and 2014 under coach George Gelnovatch.

Virginia's baseball team, has enjoyed a resurgence in recent years, under Head Coach Brian O'Connor, after hosting several regionals and Super Regionals in the post-season, and playing in the 2009, 2011, and 2014 College World Series. They finished as runners-up in the 2014 edition, despite outscoring Vanderbilt 17–12 in the three-game series. The team then avenged this loss the following year, beating Vanderbilt in 2015 for its first NCAA baseball title.

Charlottesville area high school sports have been prominent throughout the state. Charlottesville is a hotbed for lacrosse in the country, with teams such as St. Anne's-Belfield School, The Covenant School, Tandem Friends School, Charlottesville Catholic School, Charlottesville High School, Western Albemarle High School and Albemarle High School. Charlottesville High School won the VHSL Group AA boys' soccer championship in 2004. St. Anne's-Belfield School won its fourth state private-school championship in ten years in football in 2006. The Covenant School won the state private-school title in boys' cross country in the 2007–2008 school year, the second win in as many years, and that year the girls' cross country team won the state title. Monticello High School won the VHSL Group AA state football title in 2007. Charlottesville High School's boys' soccer team were state champs again in 2019, when it won the VHSL Class 4A Championship.

Charlottesville is also home to the Charlottesville Tom Sox of the Valley Baseball League who won the 2017 & 2019 league championships. Their home stadium is Crutchfield Park at Charlottesville High School. Charlottesville is also home to the Charlottesville Alliance FC, a soccer team who compete in the NPSL.

== Government and politics ==
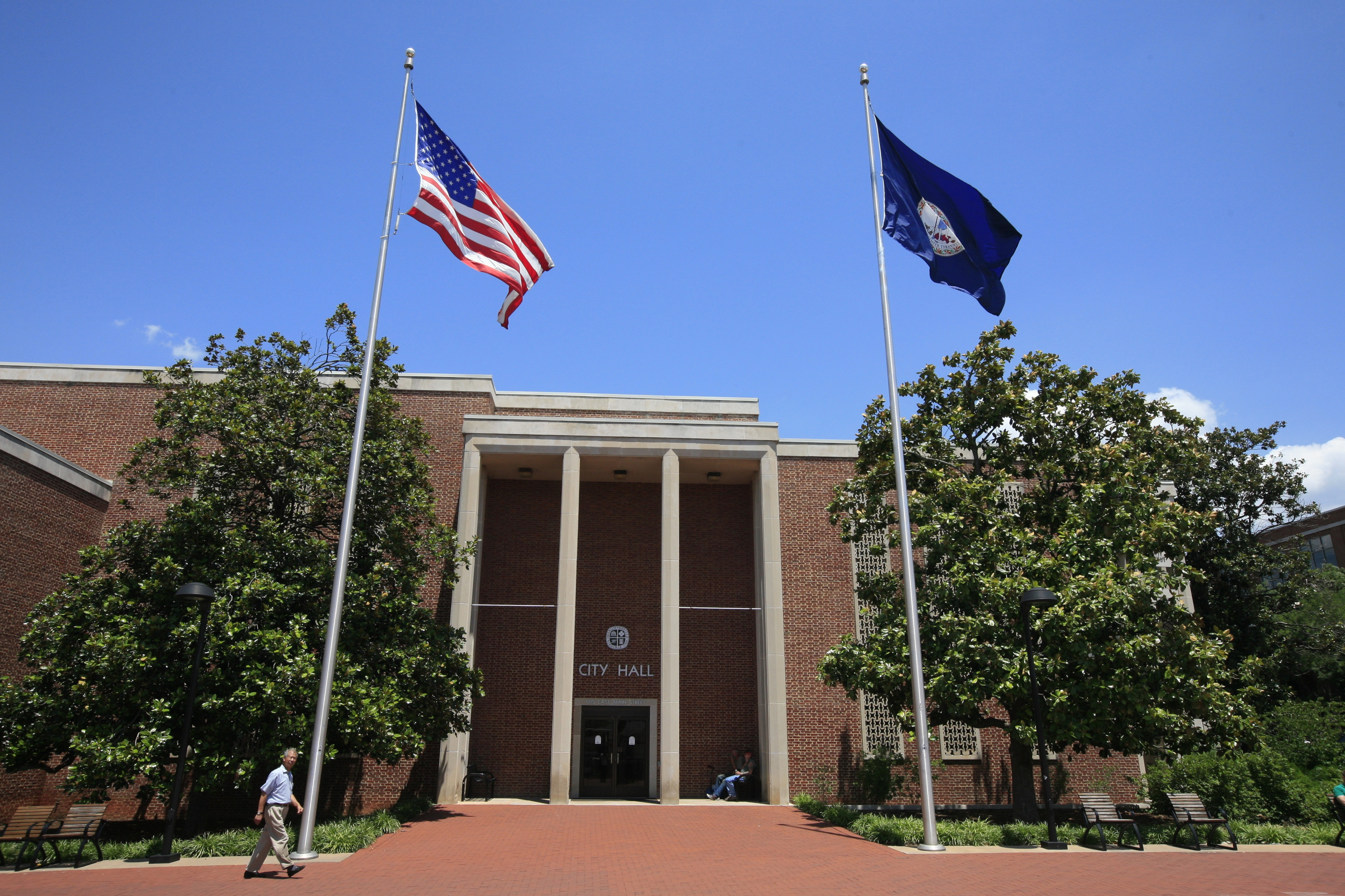
City Hall

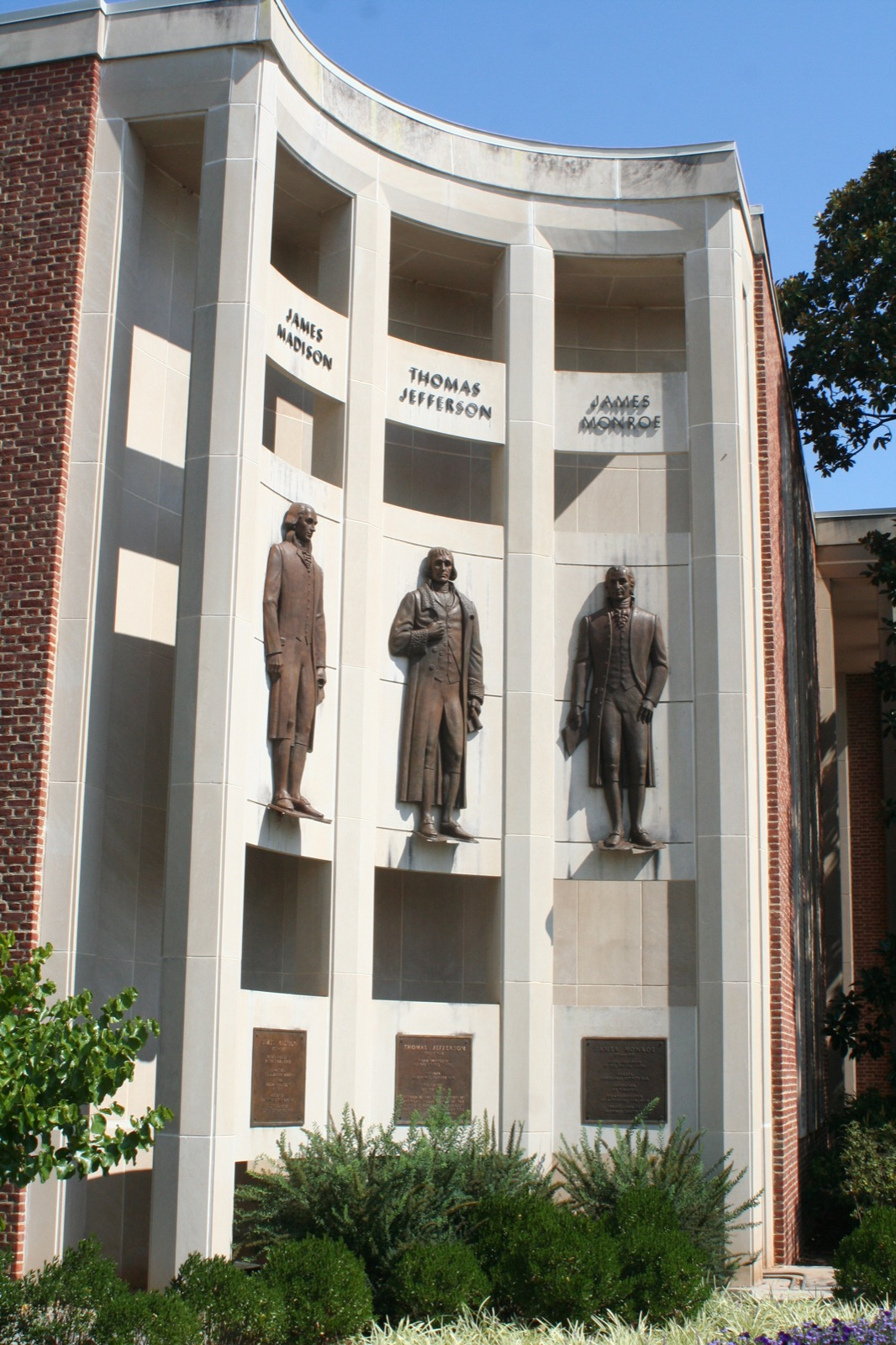
City Hall façade showing bas relief statues of James Madison, Thomas Jefferson, and James Monroe.

Voters elect a five-member council to serve as the legislative and governing body. Elected through at-large districts, the members serve four-year terms. Every two years, they select a councilor to serve as mayor. The mayor presides over meetings, calls special meetings, makes some appointments to advisory boards, and serves as the ceremonial head of government. Charlottesville city is overwhelmingly Democratic.

In June 2025, Charlottesville City Council approved the first use of ranked-choice voting for its Democratic primary election, a change intended to increase electoral inclusiveness and reduce campaign negativity.

The City Council appoints the City Manager, the Director of Finance, the City Assessor, the Clerk of the council, and members of major policy-making Boards and Commissions. The City Manager serves as the Chief Administrative Officer for the city.

According to the official page the current city council are:

Member	Party	First Term Began
Juandiego Wade, Mayor	Democratic	2022 (Mayor since 2024)
Natalie Oschrin, Vice-Mayor	Democratic	2024 (Vice-Mayor since 2026)
Jen Fleisher	Democratic	2026
Michael Payne	Democratic	2020
Lloyd Snook	Democratic	2020

=== Voting ===
Charlottesville is one of the few Democratic bastions in heavily Republican central Virginia. It has swung particularly hard to the Democrats since the 1990s, in tandem with the growing Democratic trend in areas dominated by college towns. It has recently become one of the most Democratic out of all of Virginia's cities and counties, second only to Petersburg since 2016; in 2020 Joe Biden won the city with the highest percentage for a Democrat since 1912.

Gubernatorial elections results
Year	Democratic	Republican
1993	54.0% 5,660	45.3% 4,748
1997	60.2% 5,352	37.7% 3,354
2001	72.9% 6,781	24.9% 2,316
2005	79.4% 8,018	18.5% 1,870
2009	73.6% 7,406	26.2% 2,636
2013	75.6% 9,440	15.4% 1,922
2017	84.8% 13,943	14.1% 2,315
2021	82.9% 14,378	16.0% 2,774
2025	88.9% 16,799	10.8% 2,056

Senatorial election results
Year	Democratic	Republican
2006	77.3% 9,159	21.7% 2,575
2008	83.7% 16,470	14.9% 2,923
2012	78.4% 16,800	21.4% 4,589
2014	76.9% 8,241	19.2% 2,054
2018	86.1% 17,641	11.5% 2,346
2020	85.8% 20,672	14.1% 3,409
2024	84.0% 19,439	15.8% 3,650

United States presidential election results for Charlottesville, Virginia
Year	Republican		Democratic		Third party(ies)	
Year	No.	%	No.	%	No.	%
1888	407	37.37%	674	61.89%	8	0.73%
1892	296	24.77%	889	74.39%	10	0.84%
1896	371	31.18%	801	67.31%	18	1.51%
1900	361	32.67%	731	66.15%	13	1.18%
1904	71	15.17%	391	83.55%	6	1.28%
1908	82	15.83%	428	82.63%	8	1.54%
1912	39	7.47%	454	86.97%	29	5.56%
1916	117	15.83%	618	83.63%	4	0.54%
1920	351	24.95%	1,041	73.99%	15	1.07%
1924	218	18.79%	831	71.64%	111	9.57%
1928	708	41.65%	992	58.35%	0	0.00%
1932	409	24.00%	1,287	75.53%	8	0.47%
1936	335	19.23%	1,393	79.97%	14	0.80%
1940	743	29.54%	1,759	69.94%	13	0.52%
1944	1,055	32.41%	2,188	67.22%	12	0.37%
1948	1,419	42.14%	1,527	45.35%	421	12.50%
1952	3,292	60.14%	2,174	39.72%	8	0.15%
1956	3,746	62.19%	1,783	29.60%	494	8.20%
1960	3,651	55.08%	2,894	43.66%	83	1.25%
1964	4,415	45.50%	5,205	53.64%	84	0.87%
1968	5,601	49.41%	3,831	33.80%	1,903	16.79%
1972	7,935	59.42%	5,240	39.24%	178	1.33%
1976	6,673	48.11%	6,846	49.36%	350	2.52%
1980	5,907	40.56%	6,866	47.15%	1,789	12.29%
1984	6,947	48.56%	7,317	51.15%	42	0.29%
1988	5,817	42.61%	7,671	56.19%	164	1.20%
1992	4,705	31.58%	8,685	58.29%	1,509	10.13%
1996	4,091	31.99%	7,916	61.90%	782	6.11%
2000	4,034	30.51%	7,762	58.70%	1,428	10.80%
2004	4,172	27.00%	11,088	71.77%	190	1.23%
2008	4,078	20.35%	15,705	78.35%	261	1.30%
2012	4,844	22.22%	16,510	75.74%	443	2.03%
2016	2,960	13.17%	17,901	79.66%	1,611	7.17%
2020	3,094	12.78%	20,696	85.50%	415	1.71%
2024	3,428	14.63%	19,435	82.94%	571	2.44%

== Education ==
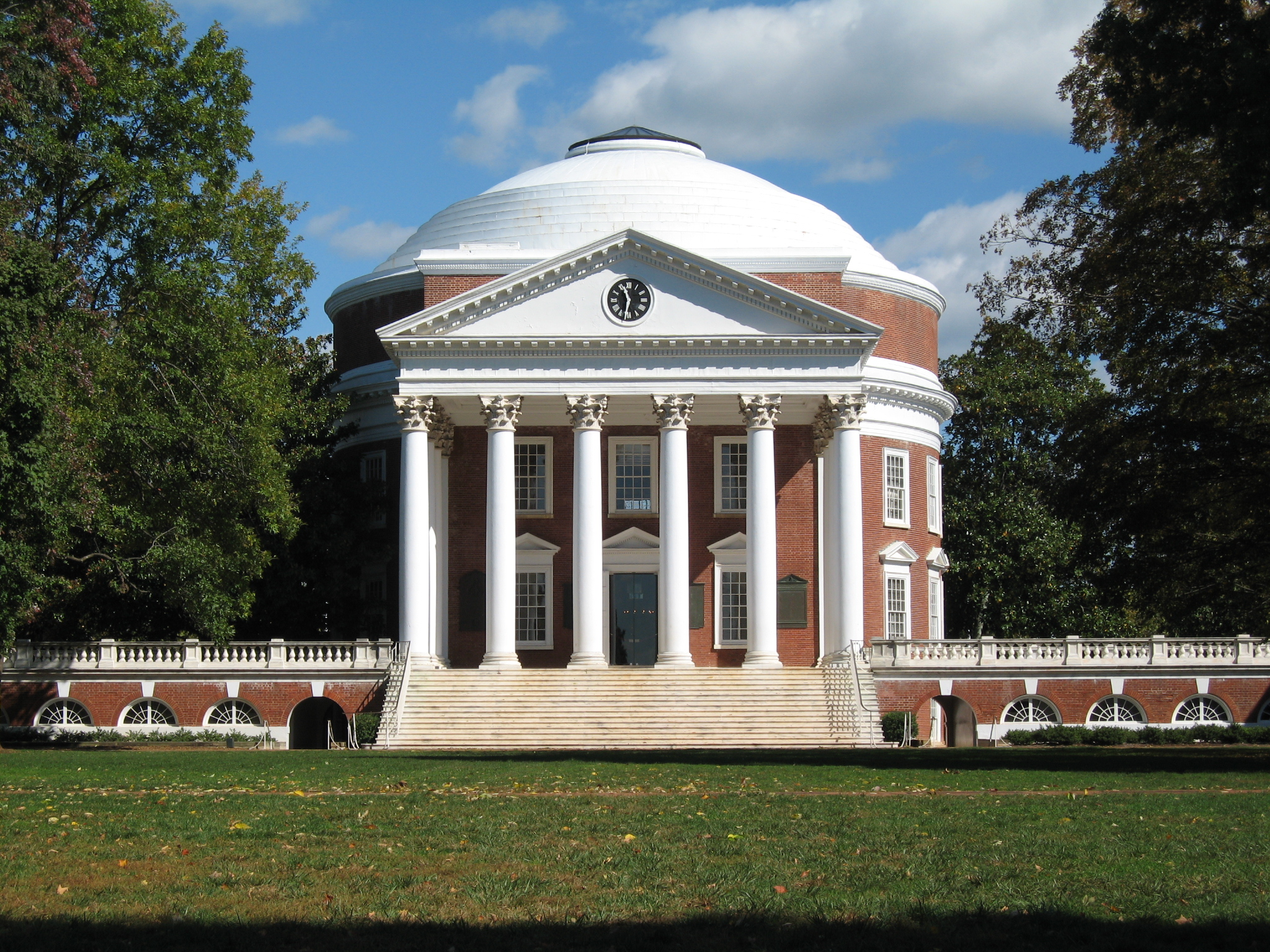
The Rotunda, on The Lawn in Albemarle County.

The University of Virginia, one of the original Public Ivies, is located in the City of Charlottesville and the County of Albemarle.

Piedmont Virginia Community College maintains several locations in Charlottesville.

Charlottesville is served by the Charlottesville City Public Schools. The school system operates six elementary schools, Walker Upper Elementary School, Buford Middle School and Charlottesville High School. It operated Lane High School jointly with Albemarle County from 1940 to 1974, when it was replaced by Charlottesville High School. Jackson P. Burley High School, a segregated school for African American students, was in operation from 1951 to 1967 and served students from both the City of Charlottesville and Albemarle County. Burley High School was purchased by Albemarle County soon after it closed, and reopened in 1974 as Jackson P. Burley Middle School.

Albemarle County Public Schools, which serves surrounding Albemarle County, has its headquarters in Charlottesville.

Charlottesville also has the following private schools, some attended by students from Albemarle County and surrounding areas:

- Charlottesville Day School
- Charlottesville Waldorf School
- The Covenant School (Lower campus)
- Regents School of Charlottesville
- Renaissance School
- The International School of Charlottesville
- St. Anne's-Belfield School (Greenway Rise campus)
- Village School
- The Virginia Institute of Autism
- Peabody School

City children also attend several private schools in the surrounding county. Those with Charlottesville postal addresses include:

- Charlottesville Catholic School
- The Covenant School (Hickory campus)
- Tandem Friends School

Jefferson-Madison Regional Library is the regional library system that provides services to the citizens of Charlottesville.

== Media ==
=== Print publications ===
Charlottesville has a main daily newspaper, The Daily Progress. Weekly publications include C-Ville Weekly, which also publishes quarterly, bi-annual, and yearly glossies such as Abode (home, garden, architecture), Knife & Fork (food, drink, restaurants), Unbound, (outdoor sports and recreation, environmental issues), Best of C-VILLE (readers' favorite restaurants, bars, shops, etc.), CBIZ (local business), and Weddings. Other magazines published locally include Blue Ridge Outdoors, CharlottesvilleFamily Magazine and Albemarle Magazine.

A daily newspaper, The Cavalier Daily, is published by an independent student group at UVA. The alternative newsmagazine of UVA, The Declaration, is printed every other week with new online content every week. The monthly newspaper Echo covers holistic health and related topics. Charlottesville Tomorrow, an online nonprofit news organization, covers land use, transportation, business and education. Other lifestyle publications includeThe Charlottesville Welcome Book, CharlottesvilleFamily's Bloom! Magazine, Wine & Country Life and Wine & Country Weddings.

=== Broadcast media ===
Charlottesville is served by major television networks through stations WVIR/WVIR-CD 29 (NBC/CW on DT2), WHTJ 41 (PBS), WCAV 19 (CBS/FOX), and WVAW-LD 16 (ABC). News-talk radio in Charlottesville can be heard on WINA 1070 and WCHV 1260. Sports radio can be heard on WVAX 1450. Country can be heard on WKAV 1400. National Public Radio stations include WMRA 103.5 FM and WVTF 89.7 FM.

Commercial FM stations include WQMZ Lite Rock Z95.1 (AC), WWWV (3WV) (classic rock) 97.5, WCYK (country) 99.7, WHTE (CHR) 101.9, WZGN (Generations) 102.3, WCNR (The Corner) 106.1 and WCHV-FM 107.5. Charlottesville community broadcasters include WNRN-FM 91.9 and WTJU 91.1 (owned by the University of Virginia) radio and CPA-TV and Charlottesville's Own TV10 television stations.

=== Municipal Open Data ===
The city hosts the Charlottesville Open Data Portal for sharing municipal data as well as community information which local businesses and nonprofit organizations provide.

== Infrastructure ==
=== Transportation ===
==== Roads and highways ====
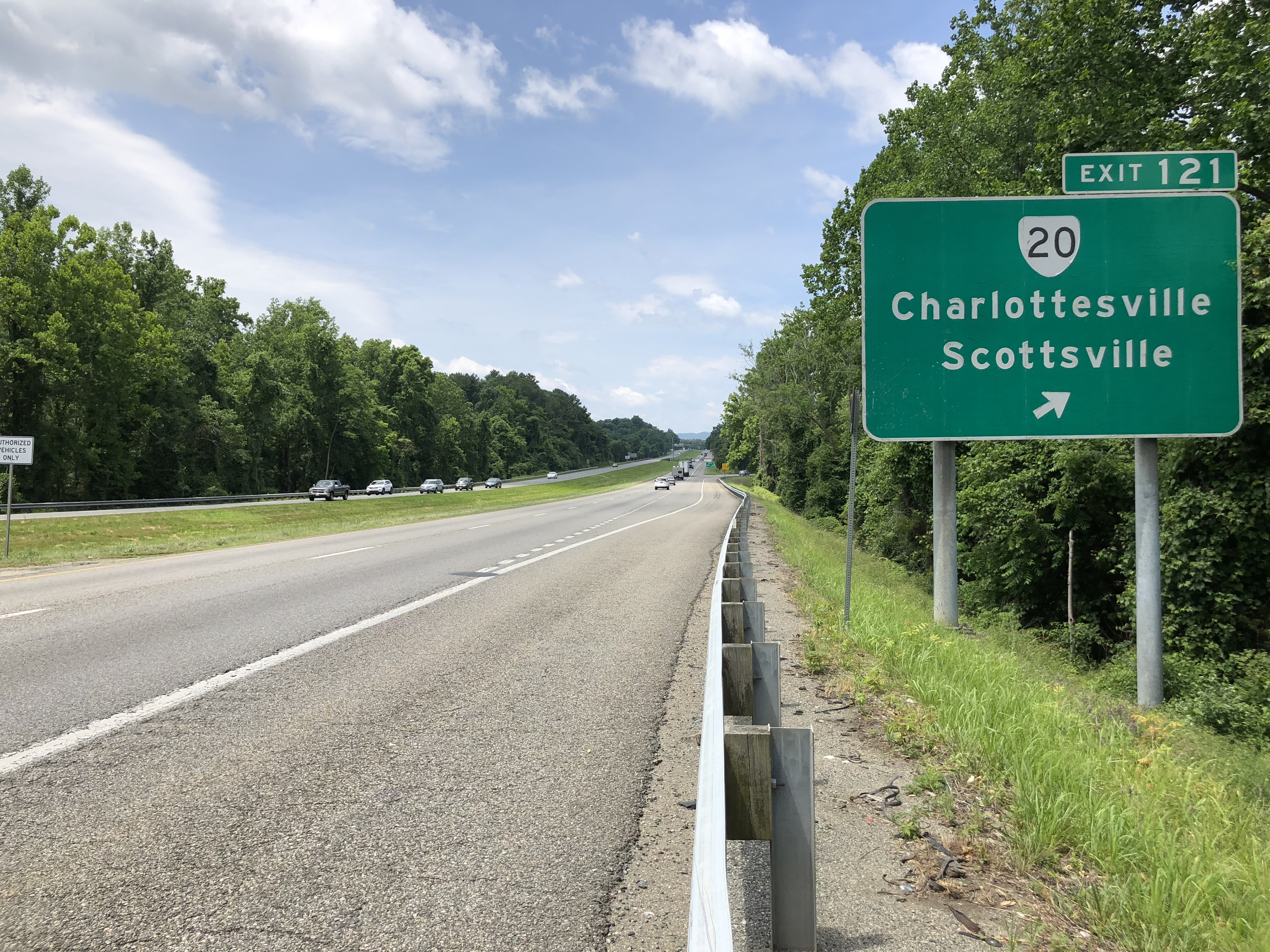
I-64 westbound at Exit 121 in Charlottesville.

The most significant highways passing through Charlottesville are Interstate 64 and U.S. Route 29. I-64 heads east to Interstate 95 in Richmond and west to Interstate 81 in Staunton. US 29 heads southwest towards Lynchburg and northeast to Washington, D.C. Other highways serving Charlottesville include U.S. Route 250 and Virginia State Route 20. US 29 and US 250 are served locally by bypasses around downtown, with business routes passing directly through downtown.

==== Public transportation ====
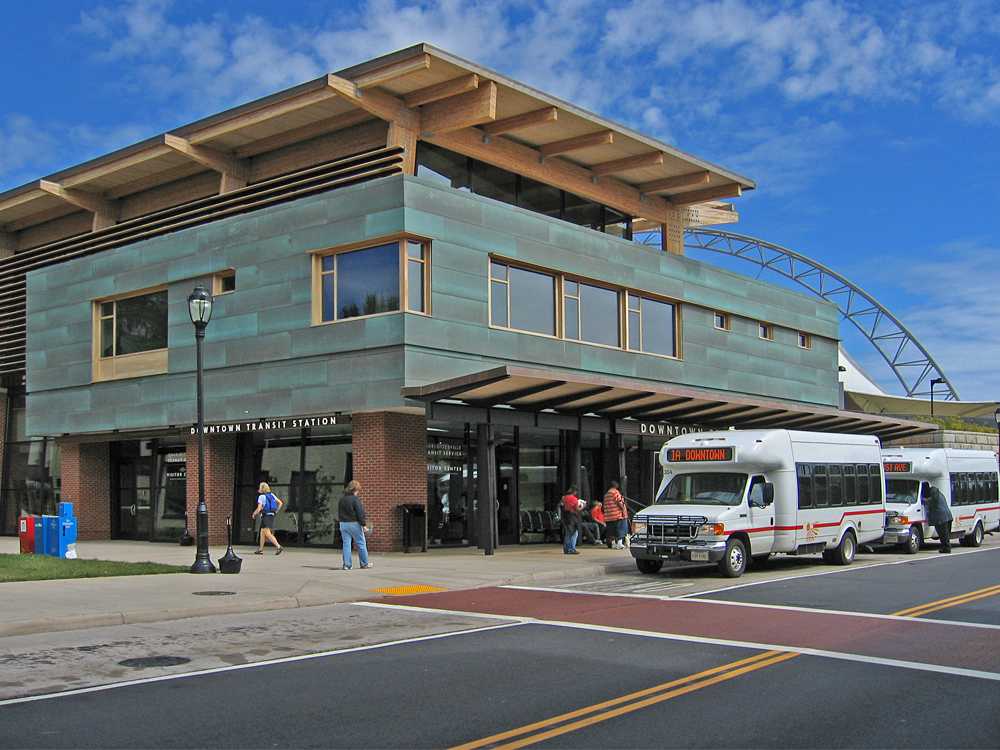
Bus Transit Center in downtown Charlottesville.

Charlottesville is served by Charlottesville-Albemarle Airport, the Charlottesville Amtrak Station, and a Greyhound Lines intercity bus terminal. Charlottesville Area Transit provides area bus service, augmented by JAUNT, a regional paratransit van service. University Transit Service provides mass transit for students and residents in the vicinity of the University of Virginia and Charlottesville area.

===== Rail =====
Amtrak, the national passenger rail service, provides service to Charlottesville with three routes: The Cardinal (service between Chicago and New York City via central Virginia and Washington, D.C.), select Northeast Regional trains (service between Boston and Roanoke) and the Crescent (service between New York City and New Orleans). The Cardinal operates three times a week, while the Crescent and Northeast Regional both run daily in both directions, but have different operating schedules on the weekdays and weekends.

Charlottesville was once a major rail hub, served by both the Chesapeake and Ohio Railway (C&O) and the Southern Railway. The first train service to Charlottesville began in the early 1850s by the Louisa Railroad Company, which became the Virginia Central Railroad before becoming the C&O. The Southern Railway started service to Charlottesville around the mid-1860s with a north–south route crossing the C&O east-west tracks. The new depot that sprang up at the crossing of the two tracks was called Union Station. In addition to the new rail line, The C&O and Southern located a major repair shop that produced competition between the two rail companies and bolstered the local economy. The Queen Charlotte Hotel went up on West Main street along with restaurants for the many new railroad workers.

The former C&O station on East Water Street was turned into offices in the mid-1990s. Charlottesville Union Station, still a functional depot for Amtrak, is located on West Main street between 7th and 9th streets where the tracks of the former C&O Railway (leased by C&O successor CSX to Buckingham Branch Railroad) and Southern (now Norfolk Southern Railway) lines cross. Amtrak and the city of Charlottesville finished refurbishing the station just after 2000, upgrading the depot and adding a full-service restaurant. The Amtrak Crescent and northeast regional travels on Norfolk Southern's dual north–south tracks. The Amtrak Cardinal runs on the Buckingham Branch east-west single track, which follows U.S. Route 250 from Staunton to a point east of Charlottesville near Cismont, Virginia. The eastbound Cardinal joins the northbound Norfolk Southern line at Orange, on its way to Washington, D.C.

Charlottesville also had an electric streetcar line, the Charlottesville and Albemarle Railway (C&A), that operated during the early twentieth century. Streetcar lines existed in Charlottesville since the late 1880s under various names until organized as the C&A in 1903. The C&A operated streetcars until 1935, when the line shut down due to rising costs and decreased ridership.

There are proposals to extend Virginia Railway Express, the commuter rail line connecting Northern Virginia to Washington, D.C., to Charlottesville. Also, the Transdominion Express steering committee has suggested making Charlottesville a stop on the proposed statewide passenger rail line.

== Notable people ==
Since the area’s early formation, it has been home to numerous notable individuals, from historic figures Thomas Jefferson and James Monroe, to literary giants Edgar Allan Poe and William Faulkner, to NFL player Ralph Horween.

The surrounding County of Albemarle is or has been the home of movie stars Rob Lowe, Sissy Spacek, Jessica Lange and Sam Shepard, novelist John Grisham, Raymond Austin, television director, writer and novelist, the poet Rita Dove, the Dave Matthews Band, and the pop band Parachute, multi-billionaires John Kluge and Edgar Bronfman Sr., and comedian Trevor Moore.

Between 1968 and 1984, Charlottesville was also the home of Anna Anderson, best known for her claims to be Grand Duchess Anastasia and lone survivor of the 1918 massacre of Nicholas II's royal family.

The city was also home of the Tibetan lama Tenzin Wangyal Rinpoche, but he and his family have since moved to California. His Ligmincha Institute headquarters, Serenity Ridge, is in nearby Shipman, Virginia.

== Sister cities ==
Charlottesville has four sister cities:

- Besançon, Doubs, France
- Pleven, Bulgaria
- Poggio a Caiano, Tuscany, Italy
- Winneba, Ghana

== See also ==
- Mayors of Charlottesville, Virginia
- National Register of Historic Places listings in Charlottesville, Virginia
- People from Charlottesville, Virginia
- Topics related to Charlottesville, Virginia
