= Charlottesville Area Transit =

Mass transportation provider in Virginia, US

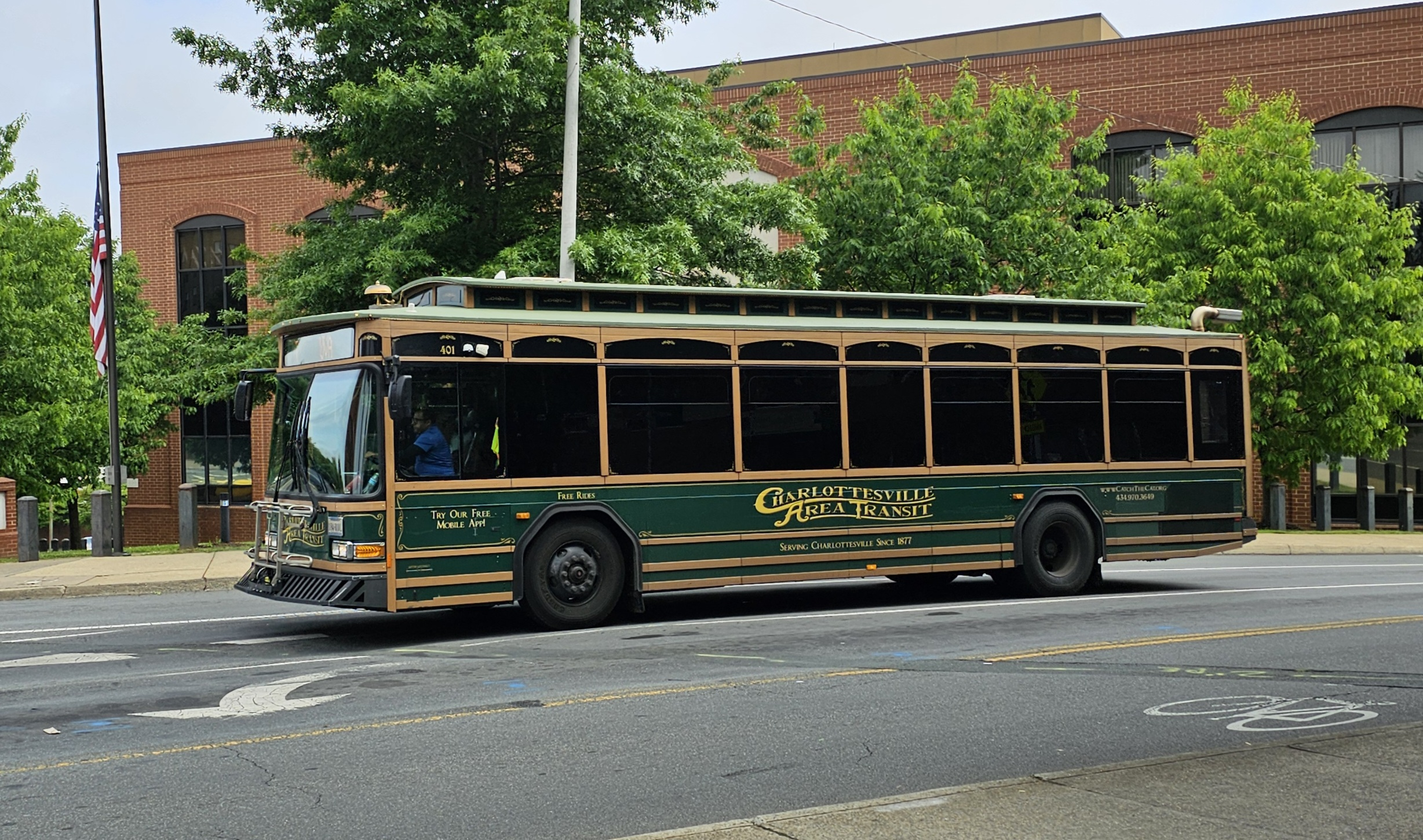
- A trolley operated by Charlottesville Area Transit
- Founded: 1975
- Headquarters: 1545 Avon Street Ext.
- Locale: Charlottesville, Virginia
- Service area: City of Charlottesville, Albemarle County, Virginia
- Service type: bus service
- Routes: 13
- Fleet: 36
- Daily ridership: 6,589
- Fuel type: Diesel, Hybrid, Gasoline
- Website: Charlottesville Area Transit

Charlottesville Area Transit (formerly Charlottesville Transit Service) is the provider of mass transportation in Charlottesville, Virginia. The organization was formed in 1975 when the city bought out Yellow Transit Company, which held a private monopoly on city busing. In 1999, the agency took a big leap in terms of providing better service and gaining more ridership, establishing a free shuttle route (which is officially called a trolley, using green-painted trolley-style buses) connecting downtown with the University of Virginia. In 2007, the University Transit Service and Charlottesville Area Transit entered into an open ridership agreement that allows UVA students, faculty, and staff to ride CAT for free by showing a valid UVA ID card. Eleven routes are offered Monday through Saturday from the early morning until the late evening. Sunday service has been suspended since 2020 due to COVID-19. Prior to 2020, Sunday service was only available on the free trolley and Routes 2, 9, and 12.

== Fares ==
Due to the COVID-19 pandemic and funds provided by the American Rescue Plan and CARES Act, CAT operates fare-free. In December 2021, the City of Charlottesville announced that they received a grant from the Commonwealth Transportation Board to continue fare-free service through June 2026.

== Routes ==
Route	Terminals			Primary Hubs	Additional Major Stops	Notes
1 PVCC & Riverside	PVCC (Dickinson Bldg)	Riverside Ave (Riverbluff Cir)		Downtown Transit Station; PVCC @ Dickinson Bldg.; Market St. @ Old Preston; Riverside Ave.		
2 5th Street Station	5th Street Station	Loop		Downtown Transit Station; 5th Street Station; Avon St. Ext. @ Park & Ride	Willoughby Square Shopping Center	Free parking at Avon St. Ext. Park & Ride
3 Southwood & Belmont	Southwood Mobile Home Park	Belmont Park		Downtown Transit Station; Willoughby Square Shopping Center; Southwood; Market St. @ Old Preston; Belmont Park	Willoughby Square Shopping Center; Albemarle County Office Building	
4 UVA Health & Willoughby (via Cherry Ave./Harris Rd.)	Willoughby Square Shopping Center	UVA Hospital	Downtown Transit Station	Downtown Transit Station; UVA Hospital/Pinn Hall (outbound & inbound); Willoughby Square Shopping Center		
5 Barracks Road Shopping Center & Walmart	Barracks Road Shopping Center	Walmart		Barracks Road Shopping Center (Arlington Blvd.); Fashion Square Mall; Walmart	Shops at Stonefield; Rio Hill Shopping Center (at Berkmar Dr.); Albemarle Square Shopping Center	
6 UVA Health & Willoughby (via Ridge St. & Prospect Ave.)	Willoughby Square Shopping Center	UVA Hospital	Downtown Transit Station	Downtown Transit Station; Pinn Hall; Willoughby Square Shopping Center		
7 UVA Health, Barracks Road Shopping Center, and Fashion Square	Downtown Transit Station	Fashion Square Mall		Downtown Transit Station; UVA Hospital/Pinn Hall (outbound & inbound); Barracks Road Shopping Center (northbound & southbound, Arlington Blvd.); Kroger at Hydraulic Rd.; Fashion Square Mall	Amtrak Station; Shops at Stonefield; Seminole Square Shopping Center	
8 Preston Ave. & Stonefield	Downtown Transit Station	Shops at Stonefield		Downtown Transit Station; Barracks Road Shopping Center (CVS); Kroger at Hydraulic Road	Seminole Square Shopping Center; Shops at Stonefield	
9 UVA Health, YMCA, and CHS	Downtown Transit Station	Kenwood Ln. at Yorktown Dr.		Downtown Transit Station; UVA Hospital (outbound & inbound); YMCA (outbound & inbound); Grove Rd. at Concord Dr. (Charlottesville High School)	Health Department	
10 Pantops & Martha Jefferson	Downtown Transit Station	Sentara Martha Jefferson Hospital		Downtown Transit Station; Pantops Shopping Center; Sentara Martha Jefferson Hospital; Avermore Apartments	Rivanna Ridge Shopping Center	
11 Locust & Fashion Square	Downtown Transit Station	Fashion Square Mall		Downtown Transit Station; Fashion Square Mall	Locust Grove Neighborhood; Pen Park; CATEC	
12 Seminole Trail (Sundays only)	Downtown Transit Station	Walmart		Downtown Transit Station; UVA Hospital/Pinn Hall (outbound & inbound); Barracks Road Shopping Center (northbound & southbound, Arlington Blvd.); Fashion Square Mall (inbound & outbound); Walmart	Amtrak Station; Shops at Stonefield; Seminole Square Shopping Center; Rio Hill Shopping Center (at Berkmar Dr.); Albemarle Square Shopping Center	Currently not in service due to COVID-19
T Free Trolley	UVA at Stadium Rd.	Downtown Transit Station		Downtown Transit Station; UVA Hospital; UVA Chapel	Amtrak Station	

== Fleet Information ==
The fleet consists of the following vehicles (as of September 2018):

Year/Make	Capacity	Length	Fuel	Wheel Chair Lift/Ramp
2008 Gillig Low Floor Trolley Replica	20	30'	Diesel	Front
2008 Gillig Low Floor	26	35'	Diesel	Front
2008 Gillig Low Floor	20	29'	Diesel	Front
2010 Gillig Low Floor	20	29'	Hybrid Electric	Front
2010 Gillig Low Floor	26	35'	Diesel	Front
2011 GM-Goshen BOC	12	26'	Diesel	Rear
2011 Gillig Low Floor	20	29'	Hybrid Electric	Front
2012 Gillig Low Floor	20	29'	Hybrid Electric	Front
2012 GM-Goshen BOC	12	26'	Diesel	Rear
2013 GM-Goshen BOC	12	26'	Diesel	Rear
2014 Gillig Low Floor	20	29'	Hybrid Electric	Front
2014 Gillig Low Floor Trolley Replica	26	35'	Diesel	Front
2014 Gillig Low Floor	26	35'	Diesel	Front
2015 Gillig Low Floor	26	35'	Diesel	Front
2016 GM-Arboc BOC	12	26'	Gasoline	Rear
