= The Corner (Charlottesville, Virginia) =

Commercial district

Coordinates: 38.0347°N 78.5002°W

The Corner is a seven-block collection of bars, restaurants, bookstores, and night spots on University Avenue in Charlottesville, Virginia, extending from 12 1/2 Street Southwest to Chancellor Street. located across the street from the University of Virginia. It is bounded by Graduate Charlottesville on the east and Bank of America on the west.

The Corner

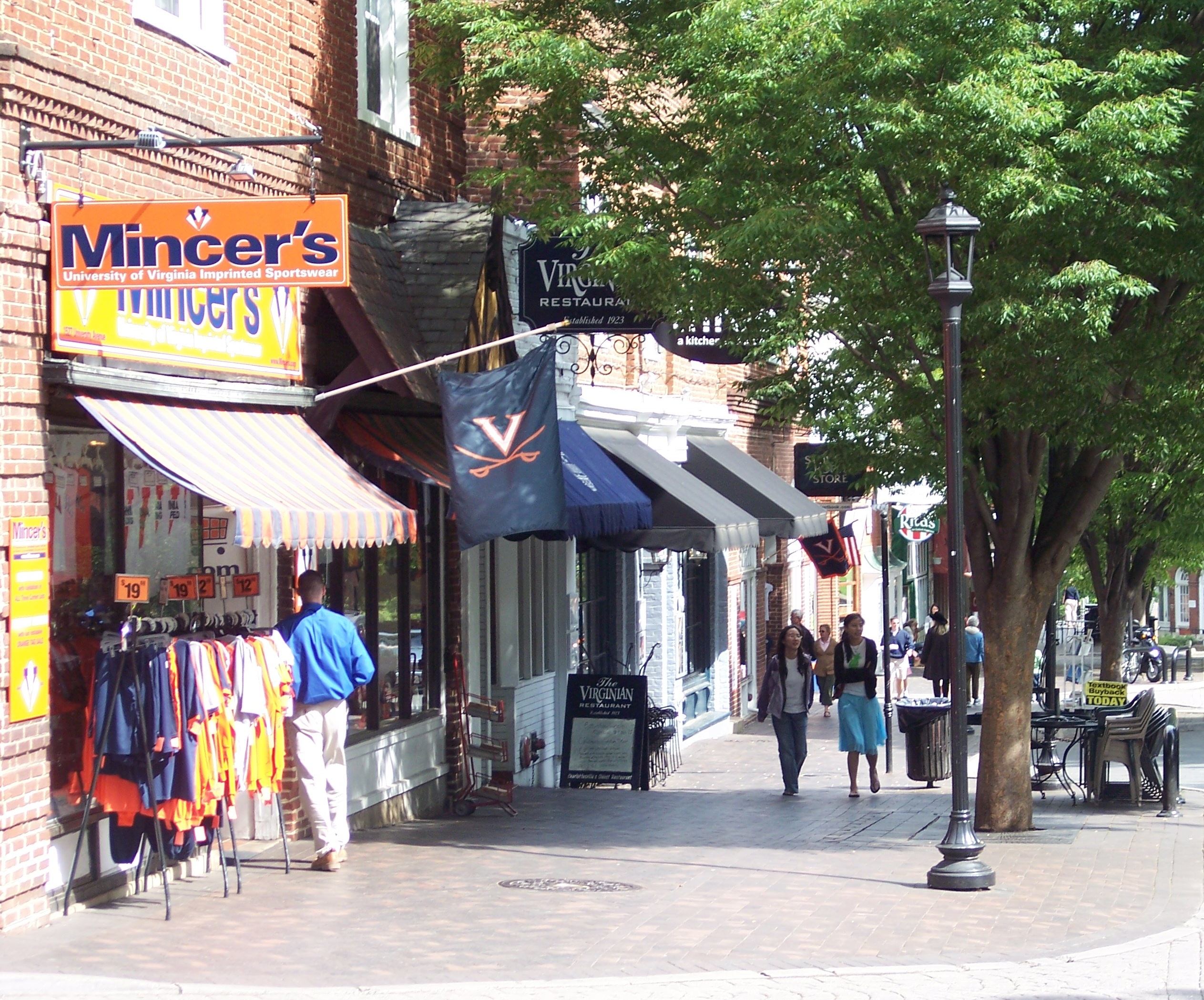
View of the Corner at the University of Virginia

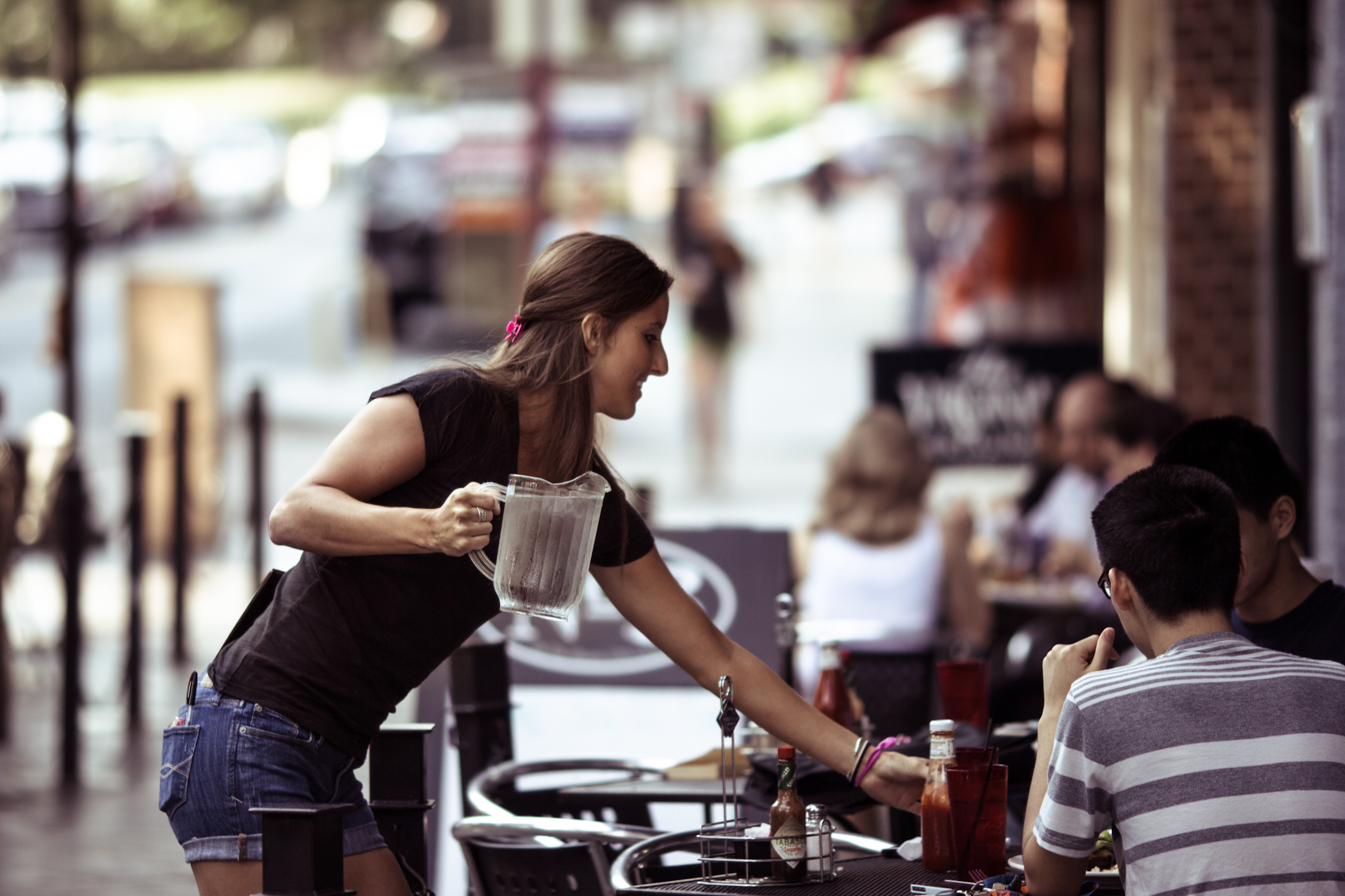
A waitress serves a guest seated outdoors on the Corner.

While the university is in session, The Corner is especially active at lunchtime, when faculty, staff, and students adjourn there for the midday meal. Patrons of the Corner's sidewalk cafés can be found spending time over a good book or simply sipping coffee and people watching. Of the 67 businesses in the district, all but sixteen are locally owned, though there has been an increase in chain stores recently. The Corner is encompassed by a Charlottesville historic district, limiting redevelopment and demolition.

As of 2000, The Corner had 26 restaurants, eleven bars, three coffee shops, one hotel, and one apartment building.

== History ==
The district was originally a literal corner, where the university's main entrance intersected with Three Chopt Road (now Main Street), which was the major route between Staunton and Richmond. UVa was established at a distance of a mile from Charlottesville, and was its own town by the name of "University." A significant commercial district developed to serve the needs of university students and employees, with a railroad stop, a post office, restaurants and shops. As downtown Charlottesville developed, followed by the corridor of Route 29 North in the mid-1900s, the Corner district came to consist more of small shops and bars, losing its movie theater, post office, train depot, etc.
