= Village School (Charlottesville, Virginia) =

Private girls school in Virginia, US

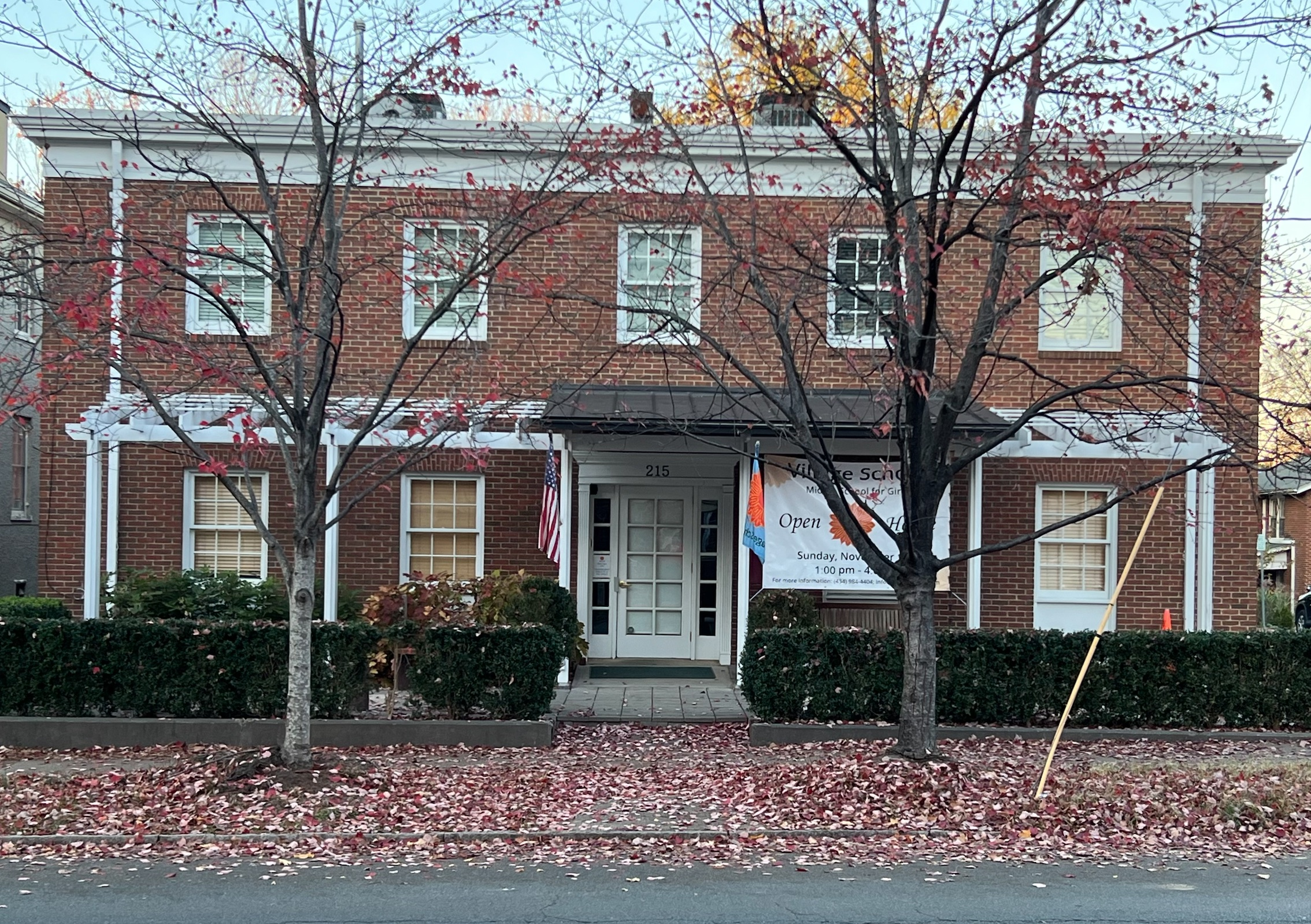

Location
- 215 East High Street; Charlottesville, Virginia 22902; United States
- Coordinates: 38.03281°N 78.478976°W

Information
- Funding type: Private school
- Established: 1995
- Grades: 5–8
- Enrollment: 81
- Classes offered: English, humanities, Drama, History, Latin, math, science, fine arts, physical education
- Colors: green and yellow

Village School is a private girls middle school located on East High Street in Charlottesville, Virginia, United States. It was established on September 5, 1995 by two high school teachers: Proal Heartwell and Jamie Knorr. The school offers grades 5–8 with around twenty students in each grade.
