= It's Academic =

American quiz show

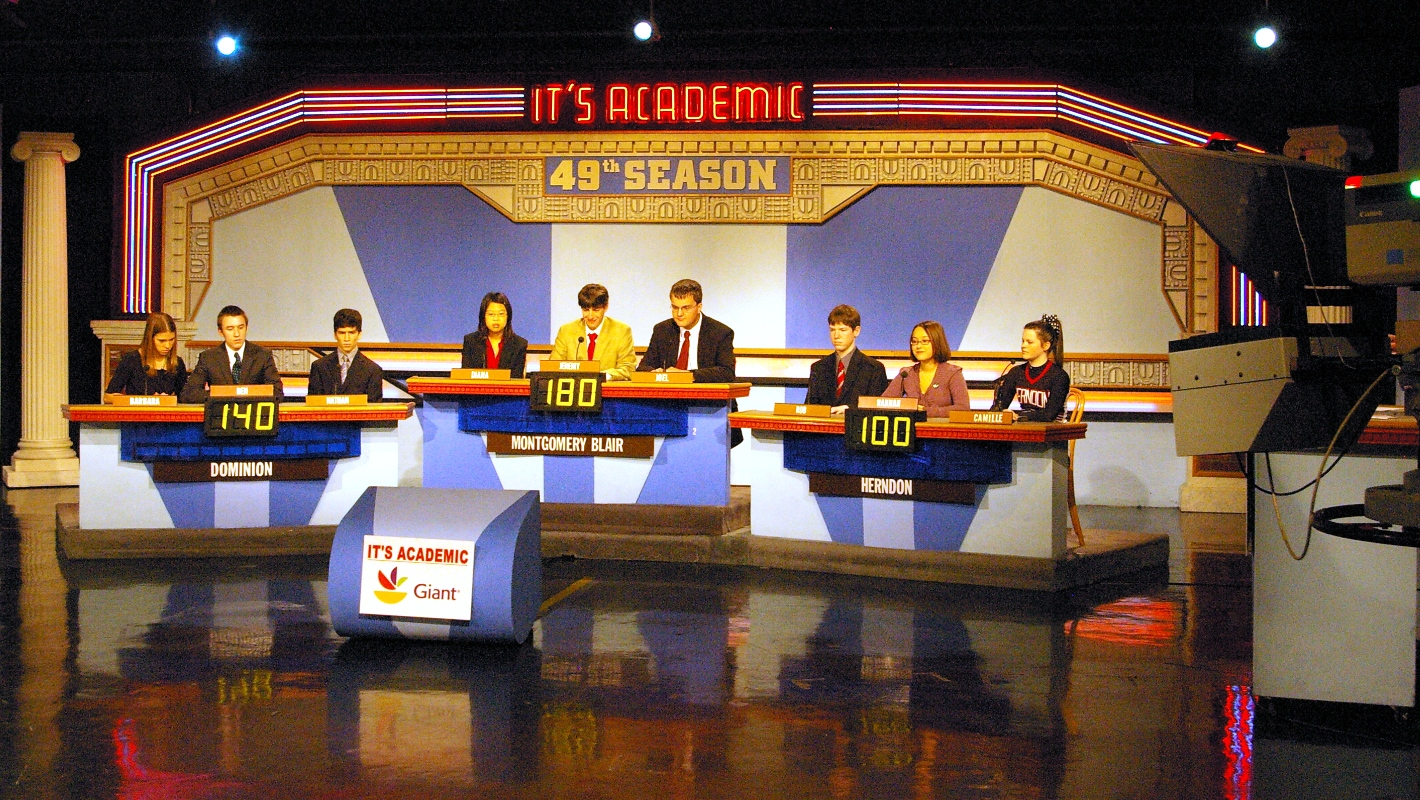
- A taping of It's Academic at WRC-TV in Washington, D.C. in December 2009
- Genre: Student quiz show, game show
- Country of origin: United States
- Original language: English

Original release
- Release: October 7, 1961 – present

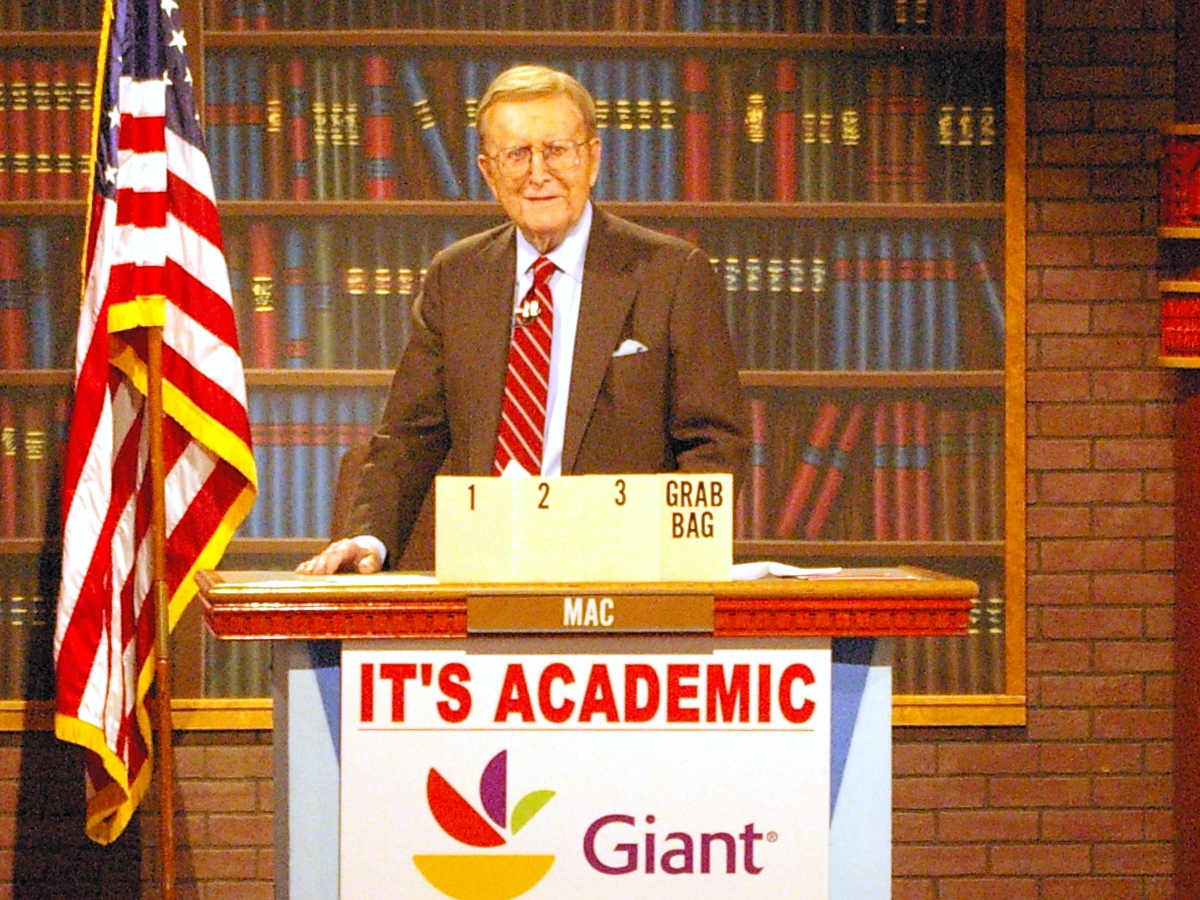
Mac McGarry hosts It's Academic in Washington, D.C. in December 2009

It's Academic is the name for a number of televised academic student quiz shows for high school students through the United States and internationally. It's Academic programs have notably aired on NBC-owned WRC-TV (and, as of October 29, 2022, exclusively on PBS member station WETA-TV) in Washington, D.C., NBC affiliate WVIR-TV in Charlottesville, Virginia, and CBS-owned WJZ-TV in Baltimore, Maryland.

The Washington, D.C. version of the show has been on the air since October 7, 1961, and is recognized by the Guinness World Records as the longest-running quiz program in TV history. The program was created for WRC by Sophie Altman, who continued as executive producer until her death on May 24, 2008. Mac McGarry hosted the Washington shows from the beginning until June 25, 2011. Hillary Howard, formerly a news anchor for Washington radio station WTOP-FM, took over as host subsequent to McGarry's official retirement in November 2011. The program is sponsored by philanthropist investor David Rubenstein and by the McLean, Virginia-based Mitre Corporation.

== Format ==
The single-elimination tournament features 81 schools in the Washington metropolitan area, 81 schools in the Baltimore metropolitan area (including Western Maryland and the Eastern Shore), and nine schools in the Central Virginia region. The winners in each region go on to battle each other in the Super Bowl.

Each contest is composed of five rounds. Round 1 is a category round with ten themed questions (e.g. "the letter B" or "famous paintings"). Questions do not appear on the players' monitors but do appear for the home viewers. Each team is given 100 points before this round and teams receive 10 points for each correct answer and lose 10 for each incorrect answer.

In Round 2, each team is individually asked six questions and receive 20 points each for a correct answer, but do not lose points for an incorrect answer.

Round 3 is a toss-up visual round. The monitor displays an image and the host provides a question accompanying the image. Teams receive 20 points for each correct answer and lose 20 for each incorrect answer (10 until April 19, 2014, in Washington, Baltimore, and starting with the 2014 season in Charlottesville; other cities' visual rounds are still 10 points up or down). Eight questions are used. The fourth question is always a math question.

Before Round 4 the captain of each team introduces the sponsors and school administrators and coaches. Teams then select from three question packets. The team to the immediate left of the team that is supposed to answer chooses which packet the answering team will use. Eight questions are given to each team, with 20 points for a correct answer and no penalties. A 25-point bonus is given if a team correctly answers all eight questions, for a total of 185 points in this round. The fourth question is always a science question and the seventh question is always a math question (data from both those questions are displayed on the monitor or team's screen).

Round 5 features quick-fire toss-up questions, each worth +/-20 points. The number of questions varies depending on the time left in the game. The game ends when the buzzer sounds, home viewers may realize that the game will come to a close while the countdown clock appears on the television screen. If a team has buzzed in prior the buzzer sounding, the team is required to answer the question before the game is considered over. If there is a tie in the knockout round (e.g. the final), the presenter may ask one last tie-breaker question to determine the winner.

After the host has announced the teams' final scores, the studio audience is invited down from the stands to join the contestants on camera during the closing credit sequence. In the Washington version from about 1976 to June 2017, the song heard under the credit roll (if there are no musicians from any of the competing schools) was "T.L.C. (Tender Loving Care)" by the band MFSB (a new theme was introduced in Washington for the 2017–18 season, entitled "Just Let Go", by Marti Amado and Ron Bolton, music production by Network Music which is used throughout the show).

As a result of the COVID-19 pandemic in Washington, D.C., later episodes in the 2019–2020 season were played in a remote format, with teams in separate locations, and without buzzers. Teams were recorded separately, and were not aware of other teams' scores. The competition returned to the studio in late winter/early spring 2023.

=== Discontinued rounds ===
Prior to the adoption of the current format, there were several other formats of play.

==== Category round ====
The "very fast" category round consisted of questions pertaining to the same category. In some cases, the question was the same throughout the round: teams were given different items, and had to answer the common question on the basis of each item (e.g., given a state, name either senator from that state). In other cases, all the answers in the category round shared an announced characteristic in common (e.g., geographical locations whose names begin and end with "A"). Teams used their buzzers in this round, earning 10 points for a correct answer, but losing 10 points (later 20 points) for wrong answers.

==== Timed round ====
In all forms, a team individually answers questions from a packet within a time limit. In one form, at the beginning of the game, teams get one minute to answer questions for 20 points each. In this form, teams are not penalized for wrong answers, in order to help the teams in "building score". In another form, teams have one and a half minutes to answer questions for 20 points each. However, 20 points are deducted for a wrong answer. Teams may pass a question, losing 10 points; however, the other two teams may buzz-in to answer the passed questions (with a few exceptions) for plus or minus 20 points after the time runs out for the team's turn. Every question that is fully read must be answered or passed within a reasonable time. However, if a question is not finished when time expires, the team may reject it without penalty or answer the question at their own risk. In this form, getting all 10 questions (later eight) correct originally earned the team a 50-point bonus, later reduced to 25.

==== Scrimmage round ====
A "scrimmage round" was once used during the 1977–78 Buffalo season championship, as well as in Washington and Baltimore through much of the 1970s, and also in Cleveland at about that time. Teams were instructed to "use [their] lights and buzzers" for a "one-minute scrimmage round." 10 points were scored for a correct answer, with no penalties.

== Guest questions ==
Beginning in 2008, telecasts on the WRC-TV version have included "guest questions" from notable persons in government, business, sports, and the arts. Among those seen in pre-recorded videos are:

- Stephen Breyer, U.S. Supreme Court associate justice
- Lynda Carter, actress
- Elaine Chao, U.S. Secretary of Labor
- G. Wayne Clough, secretary, Smithsonian Institution
- Gen. Jack Dailey, director, National Air and Space Museum
- Tom Donohue, president, U.S. Chamber of Commerce
- David Gregory, host, Meet the Press
- Miguel Insulza, Secretary-General, Organization of American States
- Tim Kaine, Governor of Virginia
- Ted Leonsis, owner, Washington Capitals and Washington Wizards
- Carl Levin, U.S. Senator from Michigan
- Chris Matthews, NBC News
- Barbara Mikulski, U.S. Senator from Maryland
- Rusty Powell, director, National Gallery of Art
- Cal Ripken Jr., member, Baseball Hall of Fame
- Tim Russert, television journalist and moderator, Meet the Press
- Chuck Schumer, U.S. Senator from New York and Senate Majority Leader
- Leonard Slatkin, music director, Washington and Detroit orchestras
- Margaret Spellings, U.S. Secretary of Education
- John Sweeney, president, AFL–CIO
- Clarence Thomas, U.S. Supreme Court associate justice
- Jim Webb, U.S. Senator from Virginia
- Elias Zerhouni, director, National Institutes of Health

== Spin-offs ==
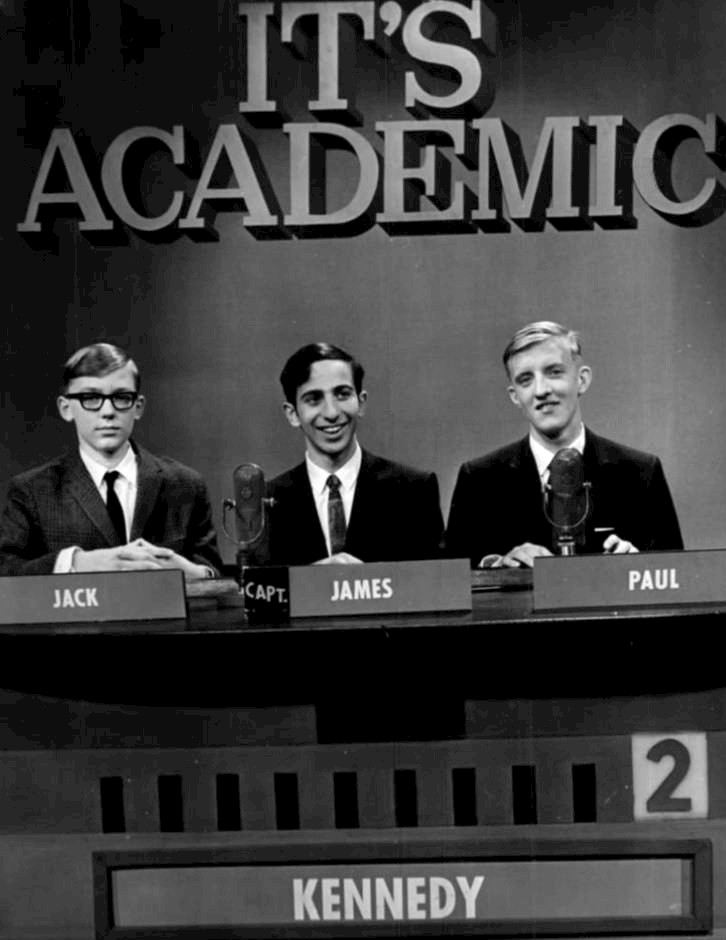
It's Academic show at WMAQ-TV in 1967. The team is from Chicago's Kennedy High School.

An Australian version of the show aired on Network 10 and the Seven Network from 1968 to 1975, and was revived by Seven's Perth affiliate in 2001. Seven took the show national in 2005.

A New Zealand version was also screened by TVNZ in the 1980s, with Lockwood Smith and John Hayden as hosts.

WNBC in New York aired a local edition of It's Academic from September 15, 1963, through July 1, 1972, hosted most of the time by Art James, with Lee Leonard filling in for a year.

WMAQ-TV in Chicago had a version in the 1960s and 1970s under the It's Academic name, hosted by Ed Grennan. The show debuted on September 29, 1962, with Arlington High School facing off against Homewood-Flossmoor High School.

WLWT, WCPO-TV and WCET in Cincinnati aired a local It's Academic from October 13, 1963 to May 30, 1982. The Cincinnati hosts included Dave Manning, Lloyd Baldwin, Steve Douglas, and Claire Slemmer.

A version of It's Academic aired on CBS affiliate WBEN-TV in Buffalo from January 27, 1968 through 1986. Initially hosted by Van Miller, the first season concluded on April 20, 1968. The show was later revived for a few months in 2008 by NBC affiliate WGRZ, with Kevin O'Neill as host. The show returned to the area starting January 12, 2013, and was hosted by O'Neill and produced by Full Circle Studios for broadcast on WGRZ.

A show using the It's Academic name aired in Richmond, Virginia on the NBC affiliate, WWBT Channel 12, from November 22, 1975 to June 26, 1976 (the Richmond championship aired on May 16, 1976), which was also hosted by Mac McGarry and sponsored by Giant. That was replaced by Battle of the Brains. Battle of the Brains has also replaced a version of It's Academic that aired in Hampton Roads.

The World Affairs Council, in conjunction with the United States Department of State, hosted an It's Academic International event in 2002, also hosted by Mac McGarry.

KHII-TV in Honolulu aired a local version titled It's Academic Hawaii hosted by Billy V (from Hawaii News Now-Sunrise). It was previously hosted by Rick Hamada and Keahi Tucker.

WEWS in Cleveland has had a version of the series since 1964. It was originally titled It's Academic and hosted by Don Cameron. In 1972, the series changed its name to Academic Challenge with host Don Webster, later replaced by Lou Maglio; the series later reverted to its former title during the mid-1990s, at which time Webster also returned as emcee. After a 35 consecutive year run and a brief hiatus, Academic Challenge returned to the WEWS airwaves in 2003 with host Adam Shapiro. Danita Harris hosted the 2006 season; from 2007 to 2016, Jason Nicholas was the host, succeeded by Hakem Dermish in December 2016 after Nicholas left WEWS. Dermish was succeeded by WCPN host Rick Jackson on April 28, 2018, after Dermish left WEWS for CBS Sports in New York, while Jackson was subsequently replaced by Rob Powers for the 2019 season.

== Similar shows ==
A similar show predating It's Academic ran in the United Kingdom for many years featuring teams from British secondary schools. Top of the Form which ran on BBC Radio from 1948 to 1986 with a television version airing on BBC 1 from 1962 to 1975.

A Canadian quiz show, Reach for the Top was modelled on Top of the Form and began on CBUT in Vancouver in 1961 with locally produced versions airing across Canada on CBC Television from 1966 to 1985. The Toronto edition of the show on CBLT was hosted for several years by Alex Trebek, who later went on to be the long-term host of Jeopardy!.

Another similar British quiz show featuring competition by post-secondary teams is University Challenge, which has been on air since 1962, making it only slightly younger than It's Academic. It was featured in the British sitcom The Young Ones where one of the characters, Vyvyan, used a Stielhandgranate against another university team.

== Notable contestants ==
Notable people who have competed on It's Academic include:

- Matt Amodio, former Jeopardy contestant
- Michael Chabon, Pulitzer Prize-winning author
- Bruce Cohen, Oscar-winning producer of American Beauty
- David Ignatius, journalist and novelist
- Joshua Foer, writer
- Donald E. Graham, chairman and chief executive officer of Graham Holdings
- Angus King, U.S. Senator from Maine
- Laura Lippman, author
- Jon Callas, cryptographer
- Peter Salovey, President of Yale University
- Chuck Schumer, U.S. Senator from New York
- George Stephanopoulos, political commentator
- Michael Stryker, neuroscientist
- Ian Terry, Big Brother 14 winner
- Mike D'Orso, journalist/author
- Curtis Yarvin, conservative writer
- Merrick B. Garland, U.S. Attorney General under President Joe Biden

Other notable participants:

- Sandra Bullock appeared on the show as a cheerleader.
- Hillary Clinton was an alternate for Maine South High School in 1965 on WMAQ-TV (Chicago).

In 1979, a charity special was held between a team of three Democratic senators (Patrick Moynihan, Lloyd Bentsen, and Alan Cranston), three Republican senators (Lowell Weicker, John Danforth, and John Heinz), and three members of the press (Jessica Savitch, Art Buchwald, and David Broder). The special was handily won by the press team.

== Champions ==
(Note: bold denotes Super Bowl Champions (1972–2021)

Year	Winners
1961	Washington: St. Albans School
1962	Washington: Walter Johnson (Bethesda, Maryland)
1963	Washington: Oxon Hill High School
1964	Washington: Oxon Hill High School
1965	Cleveland: Magnificat High School; Washington: Walt Whitman High School
1966	Cincinnati: Wyoming High School
1967	Cincinnati: Walnut Hills High School; New York, NY: Plainview - Old Bethpage John F. Kennedy High School
1968	Buffalo, NY: Lake Shore Central High School, Angola, New York; Washington: Fairfax High School
1969	Cincinnati: Purcell High School; Washington: Walt Whitman High School
1972	Baltimore: Gilman School; Chicago: Joliet East High School; New York, NY: St. Anthony's High School, Smithtown, NY; Washington: Walt Whitman High School
1973	Baltimore: Randallstown High School; Cleveland: West Geauga High School; Washington: Bethesda-Chevy Chase High School
1974	Baltimore: Randallstown High School; Cleveland: Barberton High School (Ohio); Washington: Herndon High School
1975	Baltimore: Randallstown High School; Washington: Walt Whitman High School
1976	Baltimore: Archbishop Curley High School; Buffalo: Mount Saint Mary Academy; Richmond, VA: Collegiate School; Washington: Northwood High School
1977	Washington: Bethesda-Chevy Chase High School
1978	Buffalo: Nichols School; Washington: Northwood High School
1979	Baltimore: Franklin High School (Reisterstown, Maryland); Buffalo: Grand Island High School; Cincinnati: St. Xavier High School; Washington: Bethesda-Chevy Chase High School
1980	Baltimore: Randallstown High School; Buffalo: Iroquois Central School District; Cincinnati: St. Xavier High School; Washington: Walt Whitman High School
1981	Cincinnati: Milford High School. Joe Cadle, Ralph Hyre, Brent Showalter; Washington: Holton-Arms School
1982	Buffalo: Hutchinson Central Technical High School; Washington: Walt Whitman High School
1983	Baltimore: Dulaney High School; Buffalo: Hutchinson Central Technical High School; Washington: Bethesda-Chevy Chase High School
1984	Baltimore: Dulaney High School; Buffalo: West Seneca West Senior High School; Washington: Rockville High School
1985	Baltimore: Dulaney High School; Buffalo: Williamsville East High School; Washington: Walt Whitman High School
1986	Baltimore: Wilde Lake High School; Washington: Bethesda-Chevy Chase High School
1987	Baltimore: Wilde Lake High School; Central Virginia: St. Anne's-Belfield School; Washington: Bethesda-Chevy Chase High School
1988	Baltimore: Dulaney High School; Buffalo: West Seneca West Senior High School; Washington: Walt Whitman High School
1989	Baltimore: Dulaney High School; Central Virginia: Thomas Jefferson High School for Science and Technology; Washington: Georgetown Day School
1990	Baltimore: Oakland Mills High School; Central Virginia: St. Anne's-Belfield School; Washington: Rockville High School
1991	Baltimore: Dulaney High School; Washington: Walt Whitman High School
1992	Baltimore: Wilde Lake High School; Washington: Thomas Jefferson High School for Science and Technology
1993	Baltimore: Gilman School; Washington: Thomas Jefferson High School for Science and Technology
1994	Baltimore: Linganore High School; Central Virginia: Woodberry Forest School; Washington: Eleanor Roosevelt High School
1995	Central Virginia: Woodberry Forest School; Washington: Montgomery Blair High School
1996	Baltimore: Mount Saint Joseph High School; Central Virginia: Woodberry Forest School; Washington: Georgetown Day School
1997	Baltimore: Oakland Mills High School; Central Virginia: Charlottesville High School; Cleveland: Lakewood High School; Washington: Georgetown Day School
1998	Baltimore: Hammond High School; Washington: Gonzaga College High School
1999	Baltimore: Towson High School; Cleveland: Copley High School; Washington: Rockville High School
2000	Baltimore: Howard High School; Central Virginia: Staunton High School; Pittsburgh: Central Catholic High School; Washington: Eleanor Roosevelt High School
2001	Baltimore: Howard High School; Pittsburgh: Oil City; Washington: Eleanor Roosevelt High School
2002	Baltimore: Howard High School; Pittsburgh: Ringgold High School; Washington: Holton-Arms School
2003	Baltimore: Centennial High School; Pittsburgh: Shady Side Academy; Washington: Holton-Arms School
2004	Baltimore: Howard High School; Cleveland: Solon High School; Washington: Richard Montgomery High School
2005	Baltimore: Centennial High School; Central Virginia: Staunton High School; Cleveland: Solon High School; Pittsburgh: Shady Side Academy; Washington: Walter Johnson High School
2006	Baltimore: Hammond High School; Central Virginia: Charlottesville High School; Cleveland: Copley High School; Pittsburgh: Shady Side Academy; Washington: Richard Montgomery High School
2007	Baltimore: Centennial High School; Central Virginia: Staunton High School; Cleveland: Gilmour Academy; Pittsburgh: Shady Side Academy; Washington: Walter Johnson High School
2008	Baltimore: Mount Saint Joseph High School; Buffalo: Iroquois Central School District; Central Virginia: Charlottesville High School; Cleveland: Hawken School; Pittsburgh: Shady Side Academy; Washington: Rockville High School
2009	Baltimore: Centennial High School; Central Virginia: Charlottesville High School; Cleveland: Archbishop Hoban High School; Pittsburgh: Uniontown Area High School; Washington: Montgomery Blair High School
2010	Baltimore: Gilman School; Central Virginia: Charlottesville High School; Cleveland: Copley High School; Pittsburgh: Hampton High School; Washington: Rockville High School
2011	Washington: W.T. Woodson High School; Baltimore: Walkersville High School; Central Virginia: Rappahannock County High School; Cleveland: St. Edward High School; Pittsburgh: Winchester-Thurston
2012	Washington: James Hubert Blake High School; Baltimore: Catonsville High School; Central Virginia: Louisa County High School; Cleveland: Firestone Community Learning Center; Pittsburgh: Winchester Thurston School; Hawaii: Waiakea High School
2013	Washington: James Hubert Blake High School; Baltimore: Centennial High School; Central Virginia: Orange County High School; Cleveland: Twinsburg High School; Buffalo: Williamsville East High School; Hawaii: Punahou School; Pittsburgh: Winchester-Thurston
2014	Washington: James Hubert Blake High School; Baltimore: James M. Bennett High School; Central Virginia: Charlottesville High School; Cleveland: Cloverleaf High School; Buffalo: Williamsville East High School; Pittsburgh:Trinity Christian School
2015	Washington: James Hubert Blake High School; Baltimore: Centennial High School; Central Virginia: Rappahannock County High School; Cleveland: Berea-Midpark High School; Pittsburgh: Winchester-Thurston
2016	Washington: Walt Whitman High School; Baltimore: Centennial High School; Central Virginia: Staunton High School; Cleveland: Solon High School; Pittsburgh: Knoch
2017	Washington: Montgomery Blair High School; Baltimore: Centennial High School; Central Virginia: Kettle Run High School; Cleveland: Lakewood High School; Hawaii: Kaiser High School; Pittsburgh: Franklin Regional
2018	Washington: Montgomery Blair High School; Baltimore: Centennial High School; Central Virginia: Stuarts Draft High School; Cleveland: Westlake High School; Pittsburgh: Central Catholic
2019	Washington: Montgomery Blair High School; Baltimore: Walkersville High School; Central Virginia: Kettle Run High School; Cleveland: Revere High School; Pittsburgh: Central Catholic
2020	Washington: Bethesda-Chevy Chase High School; Baltimore: Centennial High School; Central Virginia: Fauquier High School
2021	Washington: James Hubert Blake High School; Baltimore: Howard High School; Central Virginia: Western Albemarle High School
2022	Washington: McLean High School; Cleveland: Avon Lake High School
2023	Washington: McLean High School; Cleveland: Cleveland Heights High School
2024	Washington: James Hubert Blake High School; Cleveland: Solon High School
2025	Washington: James Hubert Blake High School; Cleveland: Gilmour Academy
2026	Cleveland: Revere High School; Washington: Montgomery Blair High School
