= Albemarle High School (Virginia) =

Coordinates: 38°4′32.5″N 78°30′1.9″W

Location
- 2775 Hydraulic Road; Charlottesville, Virginia 22901; United States

Information
- School type: Public high school
- Motto: "Pursuing Victory With Honor"
- Founded: 1953
- School district: Albemarle County Public Schools
- Superintendent: Matthew Haas
- Principal: Damean Barfield
- Teaching staff: 130.18 (on an FTE basis)
- Grades: 9-12
- Enrollment: 1,964 (2022–23)
- Student to teacher ratio: 15.09
- Colors: Red and navy
- Athletics conference: Jefferson District
- Team name: Patriots
- Feeder schools: Journey Middle School; Lakeside Middle School; Burley Middle School
- Website: Official Site

Albemarle High School is a public high school serving grades 9 through 12. It is a part of Albemarle County Public Schools and is located just outside Charlottesville, Virginia, United States. The principal is Damean Barfield, appointed in 2024.

Albemarle High School offers Advanced Placement and dual enrollment classes through nearby Piedmont Virginia Community College. High school students can also study at CATEC, a program where classes are focused on technical education. CATEC was jointly administered by Albemarle County Public Schools and Charlottesville City Public Schools until 2023, where sole ownership of the program moved to Charlottesville City Schools.

== About the school ==
As one of four high schools in the Albemarle County public school district, Albemarle High School serves students primarily from northern Charlottesville. It is the largest school in the district. Its feeder middle schools include Burley Middle School, Journey Middle School, and Lakeside Middle School.

Albemarle formerly served as the host school for the county's four-year STEM magnet program, the Math, Science, and Engineering Academy (MESA). Following the district-wide cancellation of selective high school magnet programs in the 2021-2022 school year, MESA was replaced with the Solve Studio, a non-selective three-year pathway program also at Albemarle.

The school is currently ranked 147th within Virginia, and 7,398th in the United States.

== Notable alumni ==
- R. J. Archer, Arena Football League quarterback; quarterback for the Georgia Force
- Steve Carter, Former MLB outfielder; played for the Pittsburgh Pirates
- Edward H. Deets, Rear Admiral in the United States Navy
- David Dillehunt, film director, television producer, and composer
- Mark Linkous, singer, songwriter, and musician; leader of the band Sparklehorse
- Brandon London, CFL wide receiver; signed by Montreal Alouettes; former NFL wide receiver; attended Albemarle before transferring to Fork Union Military Academy
- James McNew, bass player; member of the band Yo La Tengo
- Nick Novak, scored 802 points in a 10-year NFL place-kicking career; attended the University of Maryland; finished career as the ACC's all-time leading scorer and 5th all-time in NCAA with 393 points; 13 seasons of professional football; 6th leading scorer in Chargers history; AHS Hall of Fame.
- Shannon Taylor, Commonwealth's attorney for Henrico County, Virginia since 2012. Member-Elect for Virginia's 1st congressional district
- Tommy Toms, former MLB relief pitcher; played for the San Francisco Giants
- Walter White, former NFL tight end; played for the Kansas City Chiefs; recorded 808 receiving yards and 7 touchdowns in 1976
- Jason F. Wright, New York Times bestselling author, speaker and columnist.

== Notable faculty ==
- Frankie Allen, current Maryland-Eastern Shore head basketball coach; former Varsity Basketball coach
- Al Groh, former University of Virginia head football coach; began coaching career as an assistant at Albemarle
- Susan Paxman, editor of progressive magazine Exponent II 1984–1997, winner of constitutional action over maternity rights in the 1970s
- Steve Robinson, former Florida State head basketball coach; coached at Albemarle during the 1982–1983 season
- Eric Wilson, former NFL linebacker; head coach of the JV Boys' Basketball team
