= Hillary Howard =

American reporter

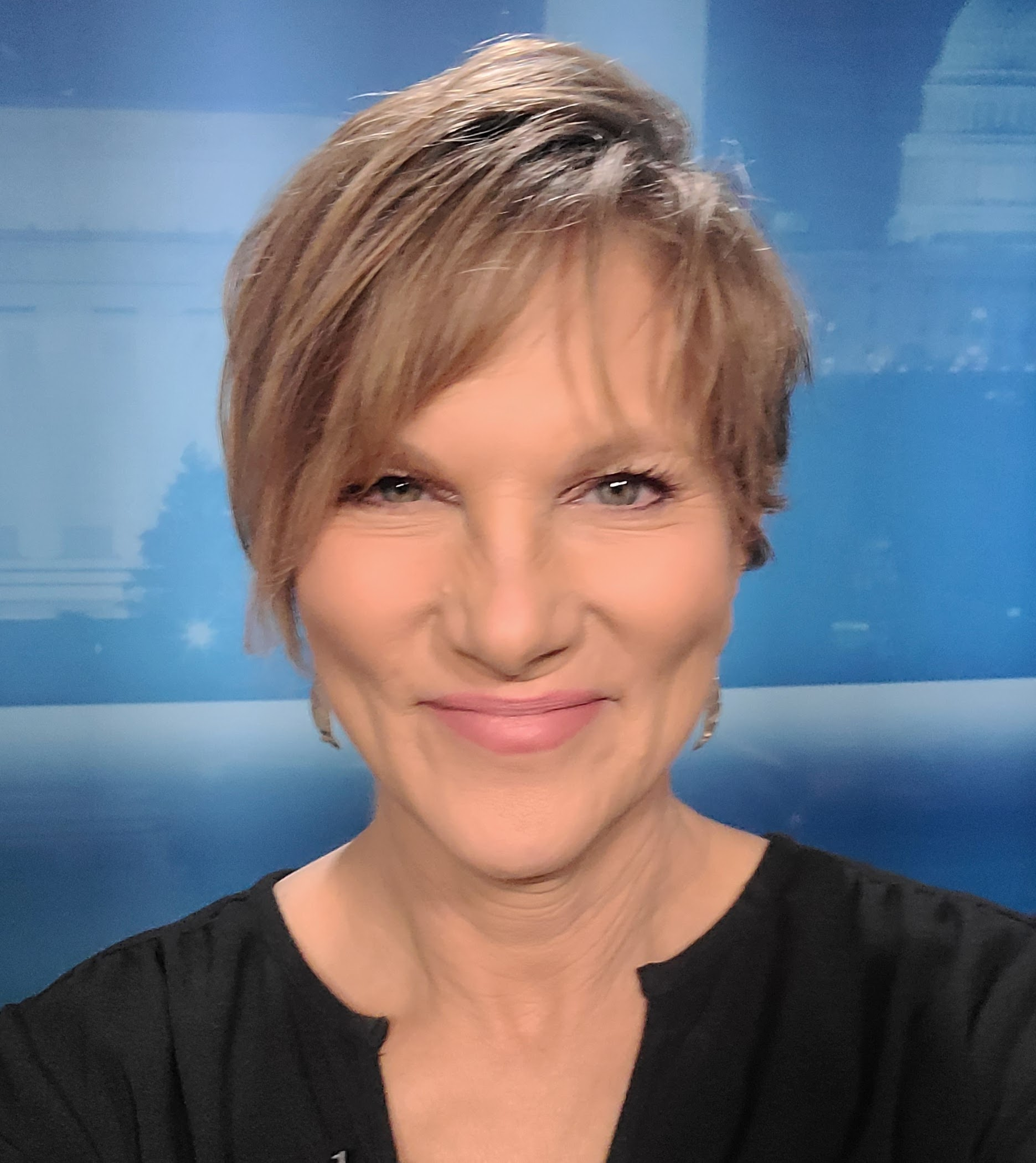
- Hillary Howard in 2021
- Occupations: Television reporter Quiz bowl host
- Years active: early 2000s–present

Hillary Howard is an American reporter. She co-anchored (along with Shawn Anderson) the 2:00pm to 7:00pm shift on all-news station WTOP in Washington, D.C. until June, 2023. Since November 2011, Howard has also served as host of It's Academic.

== Career ==
Howard is a writer, reporter and weathercaster who hosts "It's Academic," the world's longest-running TV quiz show. She succeeded Mac McGarry in the role in 2011 following his retirement. For 18+ years she worked at Washington DC's WTOP News. Howard co-anchored afternoons with Shawn Anderson after co-hosting a political interview show with former NBC correspondent Bob Kur on Washington Post Radio, a joint venture between WTOP and the Post. Her DC broadcast career began at WTTG/FOX5 where she was the weekend anchor and special projects reporter following her work as an award-winning street reporter and weathercaster. She also worked at WUSA9 and briefly freelanced at ABC7. Besides her news work, Hillary was a writer for the documentary short "Bee the Future," about an English language spelling bee for non-English speakers in Bangalore, India. Howard is also a voiceover artist, story producer and public speaker who was the 2023 master of ceremonies for the National Fallen Firefighters Memorial. Howard is an NYU graduate whose early career was jumpstarted at New York's legendary 1010 WINS where she led a dial-up "newsphone" headline service before shifting to the newsroom.

== Brain surgery ==
In November 2010, Howard fell and suffered a head injury. Later, a brain scan revealed a meningioma tumor in Howard's brain. Although the tumor was benign, she opted to have it removed. The surgery was performed at Johns Hopkins Hospital in April 2011. The operation was successful, and she recovered. Howard returned to work in May.

== Family ==
Howard is married to retired WUSA reporter and noted fire-service blogger Dave Statter.

== Awards ==
Howard won Emmy Awards for News Writing, Hard News Reporting, Feature Reporting and Weathercasting. She also won an Imagen Award for reporting on Hispanic Issues, and was a finalist in the New York Festivals. Howard also won a Chesapeake AP Award for TV and radio work. Her radio career garnered other awards too including a regional Murrow and SPJ. Howard was also part of the WTOP national Murrow Award-winning newsteam for its collective work on breaking news, including the Capitol insurrection of January 6, 2021.
