= Earle B. Wood =

Maryland Superintendent of schools

- Photo from The Baltimore Sun, August 1, 1906

Superintendent, Montgomery County Public Schools
- In office August 1, 1906 – July 31, 1915
- Preceded by: S.R. White
- Succeeded by: Edwin Broome

Personal details
- Born: August 19, 1881
- Died: March 21, 1931 (aged 49)
- Resting place: Mount Olivet Cemetery; Frederick, Maryland
- Party: Democratic
- Spouse: May Balbenia Lysight
- Children: Roger Tayloe, May-Louise
- Parents: John Eldred Reese Wood (father); Anna Olivia (Shreeve) Wood. (mother)
- Occupation: School administrator, superintendent, divorce attorney

Earle B. Wood (1881–1931) was the secretary and treasurer of the Board of Education of Montgomery County, Maryland, as well as the superintendent of schools, from 1906 to 1915.

== Career ==
=== Principal ===
In 1902, Wood served as principal of a school in Boyds, Maryland. Wood became principal of Adamstown High School in Adamstown, Maryland, 1903.

In 1905, Wood was appointed principal of Rockville High School.

=== Superintendent ===
In May 1906, Rev. S.R. White retired from the position of superintendent of Montgomery County Public Schools. Out of the 100 teachers in the county, 80 teachers endorsed Wood to be the new superintendent. The School Commissioners of Montgomery County voted on who the next superintendent should be. Wood received four out of the six votes, and he was appointed the new superintendent of Montgomery County Public Schools. Wood was sworn into office on July 31, 1906.

In March 1908, Wood reported to the Montgomery County Board of Education that Montgomery County Public Schools had the largest number of students in its history. Wood asked the Board of Education to build a school in Colesville, Maryland.

In May 1910, the Board of Education voted to reappoint Wood as superintendent. The Board of Education also voted to name Wood the secretary and treasurer of the Board of Education.

Wood was elected president of the Maryland State Teachers' Association in June 1911. During its first meeting with Wood serving as president, the Maryland State Teachers' Association resolved to support a state law requiring children to attend school. Wood became vice president in 1913.

Until 1912, any child could enroll in District of Columbia Public Schools, regardless of where they lived, as long as their parents paid a small tax to the District of Columbia. In 1912, Congress passed a law significantly increasing the tax payment for nonresident students. The law affected 500 children from Montgomery County who had been enrolled in school in the District but who would begin attending school in Montgomery County instead. The significant increase in enrolled students was a hardship for Wood as superintendent.

=== Attorney ===
After Wood's career as a superintendent ended in 1915, he attended law school. Wood passed the bar in the District of Columbia 1918. Wood then began a second career as a divorce attorney.

== Personal life ==
Earle B. Wood was raised in Frederick, Maryland. His father was John E.R. Wood, an attorney, and his mother was Anna O. (Shreeve) Wood. Earle B. Wood had one sister and three brothers.

On October 19, 1904, Wood married May B. Lysight, who was from Boyds, Maryland. They had a son, Roger Tayloe Wood. They lived on a 371-acre (150 ha) farm near Boyds.

Wood played tennis. Wood competed in a tennis tournament at Montgomery Country Club in September 1910.

Wood played for an amateur baseball team in Rockville in 1911.

== Namesakes ==
Earle B. Wood Middle School was named after him, as was the Earle B. Wood Park, next to the school, both of which are located in Rockville, Maryland.
