= Charlottesville City Public Schools =

School division in Charlottesville, Virginia, United States

Charlottesville City Schools

Address
- 1562 Dairy Rd Charlottesville, Virginia, 22903; United States

District information
- Type: Public School division
- Motto: Neighborhood Schools. Great Teachers. Infinite Possibilities.
- Superintendent: Royal A. Gurley, Jr.
- Chair of the board: Lisa Torres
- Schools: 10
- NCES District ID: 5100780

Students and staff
- Enrollment: 4,439 (2024–25)
- Teachers: 412.72 (on an FTE basis)
- Student–teacher ratio: 10.76
- Athletic conference: Jefferson District; Virginia High School League

Other information
- Website: charlottesvilleschools.org

Charlottesville City Schools, also known as Charlottesville City Public Schools, is the school division that administers public education in the United States city of Charlottesville, Virginia.

== History ==
Charlottesville's public schools were segregated for decades. Despite the Brown v. Board of Education decision, the school board refused to integrate. A lawsuit representing black students from Burley High School and the Jefferson School led the city to undertake the strategy of Massive Resistance, closing the public schools to avoid integrating.

== Leadership ==
=== Superintendent ===
Dr. Royal A. Gurley Jr. was appointed superintendent of Charlottesville City Schools in 2021.

=== School Board ===
The Charlottesville City School Board is composed of seven members elected at-large to four-year terms:

- Lisa Torres, Chair
- Amanda Burns, Vice Chair
- Zyahna Bryant
- Shymora Cooper
- Emily Dooley
- Chris Meyer
- Nicole Richardson

As of the 2026–27 school year, the board includes three student representatives who participate in monthly board meetings.

== Schools ==
Beginning in the 2026–2027 school year, Charlottesville City Schools is implementing a division-wide grade reconfiguration:

- Elementary schools will serve kindergarten through 5th grade (previously pre-K through 4th grade).
- Charlottesville Middle School will expand to serve 6th through 8th grades (previously 7th and 8th grade).
- Walker Elementary School will be phased out of its upper elementary role, with its campus transitioning to host the Charlottesville Early Learning Center (CELC) for preschool.

=== Preschool ===
The Charlottesville Early Learning Center (CELC), located on the Walker campus, serves as the division's centralized early childhood center for 3- and 4-year-old preschool students.

=== Elementary schools ===
The school division operates six elementary schools serving kindergarten through 5th grade:

- Greenbrier Elementary
- Jackson-Via Elementary
- Summit Elementary (formerly Clark Elementary)
- Sunrise Elementary (formerly Burnley-Moran Elementary)
- Tall Oaks Elementary (formerly Johnson Elementary)
- Trailblazer Elementary (formerly Venable Elementary)

=== Middle school ===
Charlottesville Middle School serves 6th through 8th grades. It was renamed from Buford Middle in August 2025.

=== High school ===
The division operates one high school, Charlottesville High School, which serves 9th through 12th grade.
