= Edward H. Deets =

Edward H. Deets III
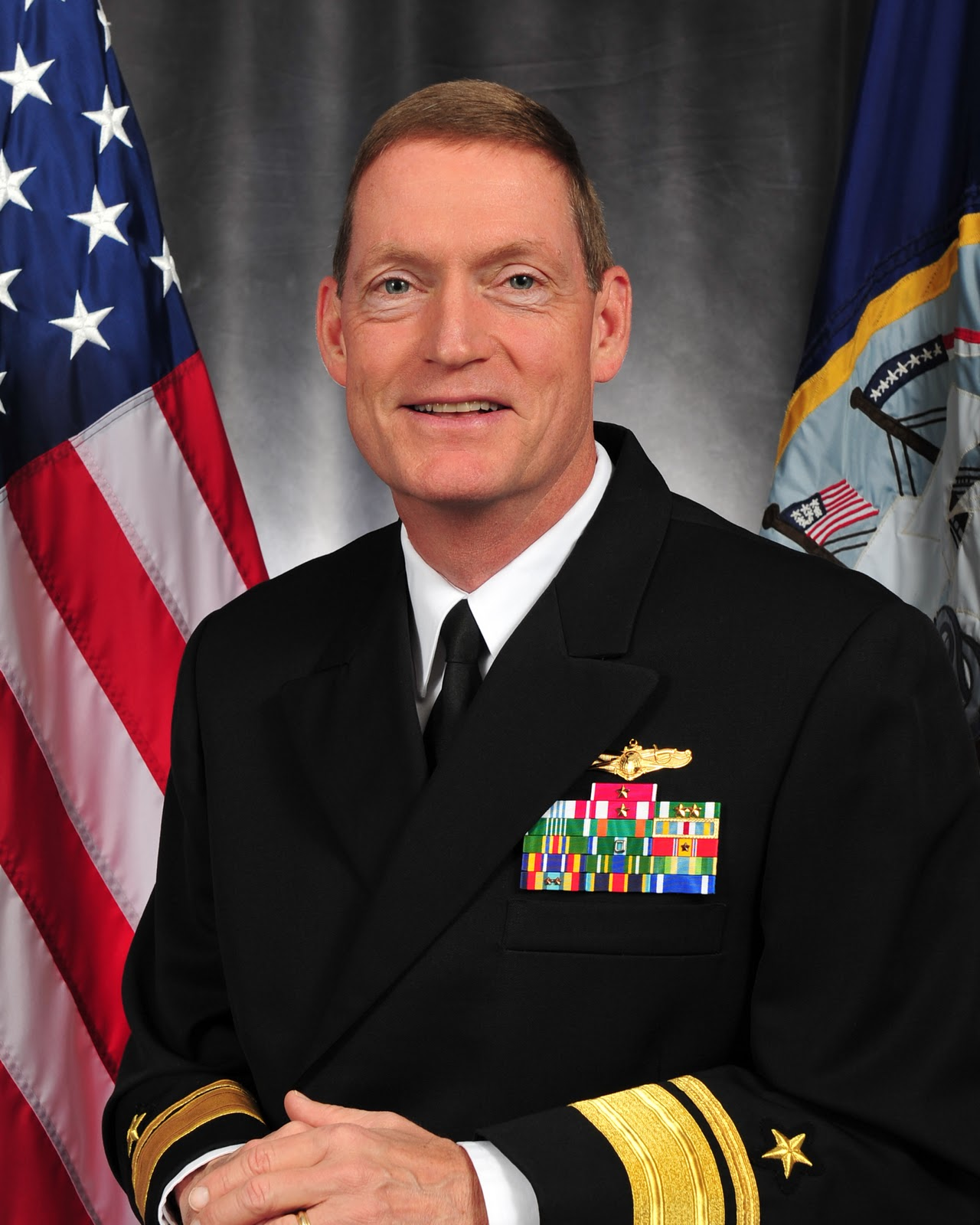
- Rear Admiral Edward H. Deets, III
- Born: April 25, 1957 (age 69); Charlottesville, Virginia, U.S.
- Military career
- Allegiance: United States of America
- Branch: United States Navy
- Service years: 1979−2011
- Rank: Rear Admiral (upper half)
- Unit: Naval Network Warfare Command
- Awards: Legion of Merit; Defense Meritorious Service Medal

Edward H. "Ned" Deets III is a retired Rear Admiral (upper half) in the United States Navy. A cryptology and information warfare specialist, Deets was the senior Information Warfare Officer (IWO) in the Navy before his retirement.

== Early years ==
A native of Charlottesville, Virginia, he was born on April 25, 1957. He attended Albemarle High School, and graduated from Duke University.

== Navy career ==
Deets graduated from Duke University in 1979 where he was commissioned an Ensign via the Naval Reserve Officer Training Corps.

Rear Admiral Deets began his Information Warfare Officer career at the Naval Security Group Activity Kunia, Hawaii. There he served as a Direct Support Officer aboard a variety of ships in the Western Pacific, Indian Ocean, North Arabian Sea, and the Mediterranean. His next tour was at the Naval Security Group Activity Pyongtaek, Republic of Korea, as the Executive Officer. From there, he was assigned to the staff of Commander in Chief, United States Atlantic Fleet.

In 1991, he reported to Commander, Carrier Group 2 aboard USS John F. Kennedy (CV 67) as the Staff Cryptologist. He deployed to the Mediterranean Sea and also participated in several counternarcotics operations on various ships. In 1993, he became the Cryptologic Junior Officer Detailer at the Bureau of Naval Personnel in Washington, D.C. Next, he spent two years on the staff of the U.S. Sixth Fleet in Gaeta, Italy, as the Command and Control Warfare Officer. He also attended the National War College at Fort McNair, Washington, D.C., where he graduated with honors in 1998. He served a follow-on joint assignment as the Executive Assistant to the National Security Agency Chief of Staff.

Rear Admiral Deets’ personal awards include the Legion of Merit, the Defense Meritorious Service Medal, the Meritorious Service Medal with gold star, the Navy and Marine Corps Commendation Medal with two gold stars, the Army Commendation Medal, and the Navy and Marine Corps Achievement Medal. He holds a Master of Science Degree in National Security Strategy with a concentration in Information Strategies.

== Additional education ==
Deets attended the National Defense University where he graduated with honors in 1998.

== Awards and honors ==
Deets has been awarded the Legion of Merit, the Defense Meritorious Service Medal and numerous other personal and unit commendations.

== Personal life ==
He is married, with two teenaged sons.
