= Billy Baber =

American football player (born 1979)

No. 45, 44
- Position: Tight end

Personal information
- Born: January 17, 1979 (age 47); Charlottesville, Virginia, U.S.
- Listed height: 6 ft 4 in (1.93 m)
- Listed weight: 260 lb (118 kg)

Career information
- College: Virginia
- NFL draft: 2001: 5th round, 141st overall pick

Career history
- Kansas City Chiefs (2001–2004); San Diego Chargers (2004); Tampa Bay Buccaneers (2004); Washington Redskins (2005)*
- * Offseason or practice squad member only

Career NFL statistics
- Receptions: 4
- Yards: 37
- Average: 9.2
- Touchdowns: 1
- Stats at Pro Football Reference

William Franklin Baber (born January 17, 1979) is an American former professional football player who was a tight end in the National Football League (NFL). He played for four total seasons for the Kansas City Chiefs, San Diego Chargers, and Tampa Bay Buccaneers.

== Early life and college career ==
Baber was born in Charlottesville, Virginia. After playing prep football at Western Albemarle High School, he played collegiate for the nearby Virginia Cavaliers.

== Professional career ==
He was selected in the fifth round with the 141st overall pick of the 2001 NFL draft by the Kansas City Chiefs. Baber played in just one game during his rookie season. In 2002, he started 2 of the 12 games that he played in, recording 2 receptions for ten yards and 1 touchdown. The following year, he played all 16 games but made just one reception for 20 yards. In November 2004, the Chiefs waived Baber. The San Diego Chargers acquired him, but he did not see action. Finally, he played his last game, in 2004, for the Tampa Bay Buccaneers, recording 1 reception for 7 yards.
