= Albemarle County Public Schools =

School district in Virginia, United States

Coordinates: 38°2′6.79852″N 78°28′59.02064″W

Address
- 401 McIntire Road Charlottesville, Virginia, 22902; United States

Other information
- Website: www.k12albemarle.org

Albemarle County Public Schools (ACPS) is a school district serving Albemarle County, Virginia. Its headquarters are in the City of Charlottesville. ACPS serves approximately 14,000 students in preschool through grade 12 in Albemarle County, Virginia, the sixth largest county by area in the Commonwealth of Virginia. A diverse locality of 726 square miles in the heart of Central Virginia, Albemarle County is a blend of primarily rural, but also suburban and urban settings.

== Governance ==
ACPS is governed by a 7-member school board. 6 members are elected by the county's 6 magisterial districts, while one at-large member is elected by the entire county. Elections are held on odd-numbered years, and members serve staggered 4-year terms.

If a vacancy occurs, the board appoints a new member to serve until the next election. A special election may be held if necessary.

ACPS School Board (Oct. 2026)
Jack Jouett District	White Hall District	Rio District	Rivanna District	Samuel Miller District	Scottsville District	At-Large
Kate Acuff	Rebecca Berlin	Jim Dillenbeck	Judy Le	Bob Beard	Ellen Osborne	David Storm
	Chair				Vice-chair	
Elected 2021	Elected 2023	Elected 2025	Elected 2023	Elected 2021	Elected 2023	Appointed 2026

== Schools ==
=== Academies and Lab Schools ===
Name	Address	Image
Community Lab School (Virginia) (formerly Murray High School) Community Public Charter School ("Community Middle")	1200 Forest Street, Charlottesville, VA 22903	
Environmental Studies Academy (ESA) (Replaced by Studios)	5941 Rockfish Gap Turnpike, Crozet, VA 22932	
Health and Medical Sciences Academy (HMSA) (Replaced by Studios)	1400 Independence Way, Charlottesville, VA 22902	
Math, Engineering, Science Academy (MESA) (Replaced by Studios)	2775 Hydraulic Road, Charlottesville, VA 22901	

=== Comprehensive High Schools ===
Name	Address	Image
Albemarle	2775 Hydraulic Road, Charlottesville, VA 22901	
Monticello	1400 Independence Way, Charlottesville, VA 22902	
Western Albemarle	5941 Rockfish Gap Turnpike, Crozet, VA 22932	

=== Comprehensive Middle Schools ===
Name	Address	Image
Jackson P. Burley	901 Rose Hill Drive, Charlottesville, VA 22903	
Joseph T. Henley	5880 Rockfish Gap Turnpike, Crozet, VA 22932	
Journey (formerly Jack Jouett)	210 Lambs Lane, Charlottesville, VA 22901	
Lakeside (formerly Mortimer Y. Sutherland)	2801 Powell Creek Drive, Charlottesville, VA 22911	
Leslie H. Walton	4217 Red Hill Road, Charlottesville, VA 22903	

=== Elementary schools ===
Name	Address	Image
Agnor (formerly Agnor-Hurt)	3201 Berkmar Drive, Charlottesville, VA 22901	
Baker-Butler	2740 Proffit Road, Charlottesville, VA 22911	
Broadus Wood	185 Buck Mountain Road, Earlysville, VA 22936	
Brownsville	5870 Rockfish Gap Turnpike, Crozet, VA 22932	
Crozet	1407 Crozet Avenue, Crozet, VA 22932	
Mary C. Greer	190 Lambs Lane, Charlottesville, VA 22901	
Hollymead	2775 Powell Creek Drive, Charlottesville, VA 22911	
Ivy (formerly Meriwether Lewis)	1610 Owensville Road, Charlottesville, VA 22901	
Mountain View Primary School	1757 Avon Street Extended, Charlottesville, VA 22902	
Mountain View Upper Elementary (formerly Paul H. Cale)	1757 Avon Street Extended, Charlottesville, VA 22902	
Virginia L. Murray	3251 Morgantown Road, Charlottesville, VA 22903	
Red Hill	3901 Red Hill School Road, North Garden, VA 22959	
Scottsville	7868 Scottsville Road, Scottsville, VA 24590	
Stone-Robinson	958 North Milton Road, Charlottesville, VA 22911	
Stony Point	3893 Stony Point Road, Keswick, VA 22947	
Woodbrook	100 Woodbrook Drive, Charlottesville, VA 22901	

=== Alternative, Regional, and Specialty Centers ===
Name	Address	Image
ACE Academy - Lambs Lane Campus	2765 Hydraulic Road, Charlottesville, VA 22901	
CATEC (Charlottesville Albemarle Technical Education Center)	1000 East Rio Road, Charlottesville, VA 22901	
Center 1	1180 Seminole Trail, Suite 225, Charlottesville, VA 22901	
Ivy Creek School	227 Lambs Lane, Charlottesville, VA 22901	
PREP (Piedmont Regional Education Program)	227 Lambs Lane, Charlottesville, VA 22901	

== Policy and Politics ==
=== School Renamings ===
From 2018 to 2024, ACPS renamed several district schools. The board drew sharp criticism after renaming Meriwether Lewis Elementary to Ivy Elementary despite overwhelming support for the original name. In a similar case, constituents objected after the board excised former Principal Benjamin Hurt's name from Agnor-Hurt Elementary. In another instance, the board renamed Paul H. Cale Elementary to Mountain View, on the grounds that Cale had hindered racial integration as superintendent. The Cale family disputed this notion, noting that the accusation largely rested on paraphrased quotes from a single source.

== Graduates ==
2018 ACPS graduates received 1,078 acceptances from 204 colleges and universities, including 146 acceptances from 15 of the top 25 national universities, according to rankings by U.S. News & World Report.

Of the 1,070 graduates:

- 617 (57.7%) reported plans to attend a 4-year college.
- 255 (23.8%) reported plans to attend a 2-year college.
- 198 (18.5%) reported alternate plans, including other continuing education, military, employment, or something else.

== Other Data ==
ACPS students were born in 89 countries and speak 74 home languages.

Average Class Size for 2017–18:

- Elementary – 19.4
- Middle – 22.1
- High – 21.4

Student-to-Computer Ratio: 1:1 for grades 3–12; 3:2 for grades K-2

Average number of meals served daily (including breakfast and lunch): 8,000

School bus miles traveled daily: 14,384

The Families in Crisis Program served approximately 457 homeless children in the 2017–18 school year, including 255 ACPS students and other children/students (siblings of ACPS students who are preschoolers or dropouts, and students living in Albemarle County who attend adjoining school systems).

== Budget Snapshot ==
=== Operating Budget ===
FY 18–19 (Adopted): $186,800,503

FY 17–18 (Adopted): $180,486,940

FY 16–17 (Actual): $171,085,922

=== Per Pupil Expenses ===
FY 18–19 (Adopted): $13,635.07

FY 17–18 (Adopted): $13,418.11

FY 16–17 (Actual): $12,760.94
