= Monticello High School (Virginia) =

Public high school in Virginia, US

Coordinates: 37°59′56.5″N 78°29′21″W

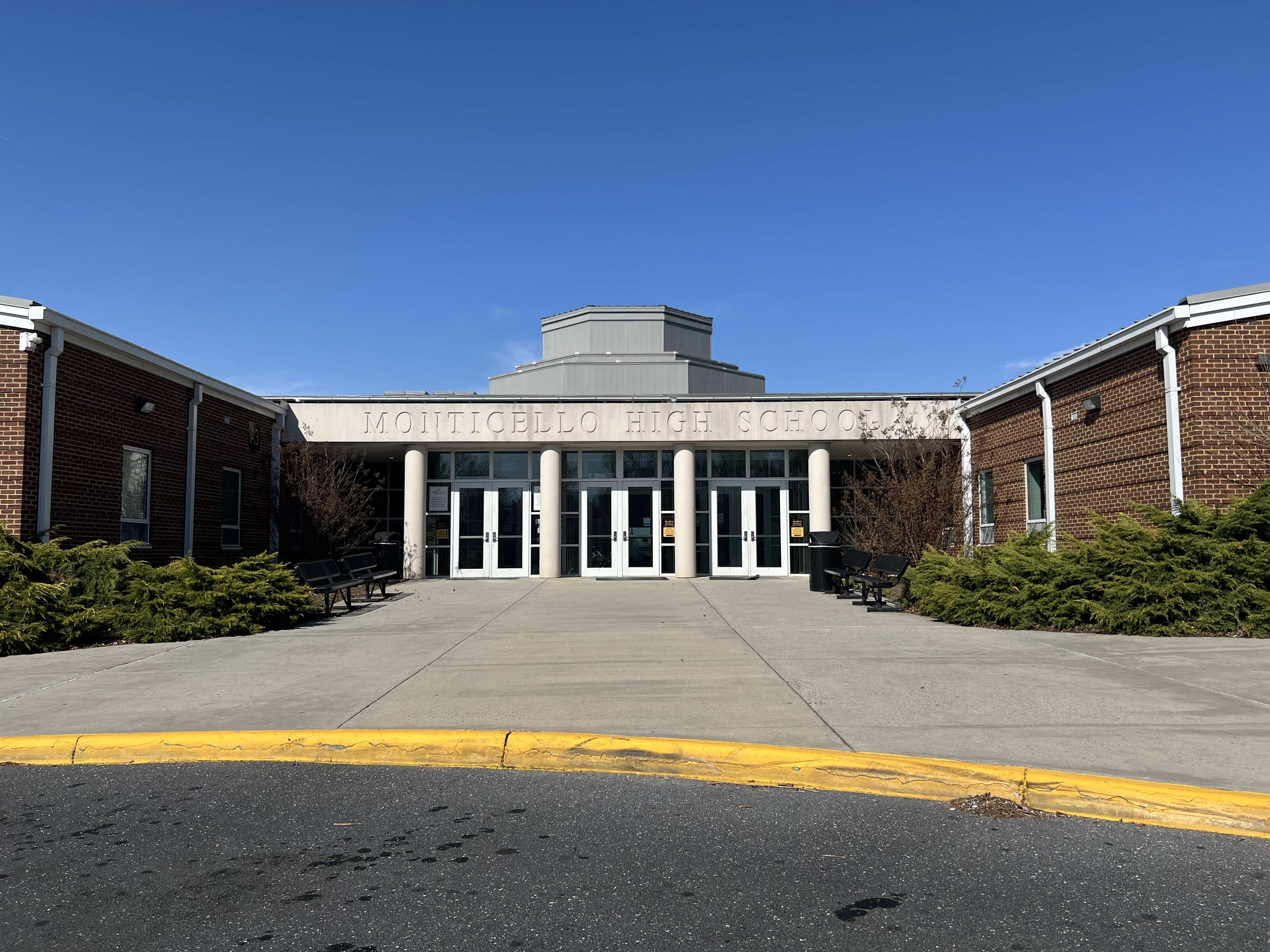

Location
- 1400 Independence Way; Charlottesville, VA 22902; United States

Information
- School type: Public high school
- Established: 1998
- Principal: Beth Costa
- Grades: 9-12
- Enrollment: 1,185 (2020-21)
- Schedule type: Four-by-Four Yearlong
- Campus: Suburban
- Colors: Black and Gold
- Athletics conference: Jefferson District; VHSL Class 3, Region 3C
- Mascot: Monty the Mustang
- Feeder schools: Walton Middle School; Burley Middle School
- Website: mohs.k12albemarle.org

Monticello High School (MHS) is a suburban public high school located in Albemarle County, Virginia, United States, outside Charlottesville. Opening in 1998, it is one of three traditional comprehensive high schools in the Albemarle County Public Schools System. The school is named after Monticello, the nearby estate of President Thomas Jefferson.

The lyrics to the "Mustang School Song," sung to the tune of "The Victors."

With an enrollment of 1,185 students in grades 9 through 12, Monticello receives students from Walton and Burley Middle Schools, which cover the southern and eastern portions of Albemarle County. The school colors are black and gold, and the mascot is a Mustang. The school's fight song uses the tune of “The Victors.” The lyrics to the song were written in July 1998 by one of the first assistant principals Dr. Greg Domecq.

Effective in the 2019–20 school year, Monticello, along with all the other Albemarle County high schools, operates on a Four-by-Four yearlong schedule, with two sets of classes alternating days and Fridays switching between the two. Dr. Beth Costa became Monticello High School's seventh principal in July 2022.

== Accolades and academics ==
In June 2019, theater teacher Madeline Michel won the Tony Award for Excellence in Theater Education. Michel won the award for her creation of an inclusive drama program that invites students from all walks of life to contribute to performances by writing plays, directing, and expressing themselves freely onstage. In the aftermath of the "Unite the Right" rally turned riot in Charlottesville in 2017, the students in theater at Monticello High School wrote and performed one-act plays addressing racial inequality.

In the spring of 2006, biology teacher Jeremy Dove was recognized with the Presidential Award for Excellence in Mathematics and Science Teaching.

Monticello High School is fully accredited by the Virginia State Board of Education and the Southern Association of Colleges and Schools. The school offers 19 Advanced Placement courses, which are: English Language, English Literature, European History, US History, US Government, World History, Human Geography, Biology II, French V, Spanish V, German V, Psychology, Statistics, Calculus AB, Calculus BC, Physics II, Chemistry II, Environmental Science, and Studio Art.

== Athletics ==
Monticello High School offers 25 interscholastic sports as well as theater, scholastic bowl, and debate programs.

Since it opened in 1998, Monticello has been a member of the Jefferson District, which includes seven other area high schools in Region II of the Virginia High School League's AA classification (A-AAA scale). In football, the school has shifted between Divisions 3 and 4 of Class AA. For the 2009-2011 two season cycle, MHS competes in Division 3.

The Mustangs won at least eight games each football season from 2002 to 2008. In 2003, Monticello advanced to the Division 3 state championship and lost to Gretna High School. The Mustangs returned to the Division 3 State Championship in 2007 and defeated Richlands High School 36–22, clinching the first state championship for any Charlottesville-area high school football team. In the following 2008 season, Coach Bicknell's team claimed back-to-back Region II Championships, but the season ended abruptly after a controversial 4th Quarter penalty in a Division 3 state semifinal game at James Monroe High School.

The Monticello debate team has been represented in the VHSL State Championship tournament twice in the last three years.

The Monticello Golf Team attended the VHSL State Championship in 2021

The Monticello Girls Cross Country team were state runner-ups in the 2015 season.

Four Monticello teams have won VHSL state championships: Football, 2007; Girls Swim & Dive, 2021; Boys Indoor Track & Field, 2021; and eSports League of Legends, 2022.

On-campus facilities include a multi-purpose stadium with track, softball and baseball fields, a cross country running trail, multiple practice fields, two gymnasiums and weight rooms. The school's boys and girls tennis teams use the courts at adjacent Piedmont Virginia Community College. As of August 2009, Mustangs Stadium features an All Turf Playing Field. Construction began in June 2009 after several years of planning and fundraising.

Since 2002, Mustang Stadium has also served as the venue for the Jefferson Classic, a high school marching band contest held the first Saturday in October and sponsored by the Monticello Bands and Music Boosters.

== Notable alumni ==
- Mike Brown – NFL wide receiver and assistant coach at Notre Dame.
- Eli Cook – singer, songwriter, guitarist, and record producer.
- Malachi Fields – Wide receiver for Virginia and Notre Dame.
- Ben King – professional cyclist who earned two Top 75 finishes in the Tour de France.
