= Louisa County High School =

Coordinates: 38°1′2.9″N 77°55′15.2″W

Location
- 757 Davis Highway; Mineral, Virginia 23117; United States

Information
- School type: Public high school
- Motto: P.R.I.D.E.
- Established: 1940
- School district: Louisa County Public Schools
- CEEB code: 471445
- Principal: Rodney Redd
- Teaching staff: 109.48 (FTE)
- Grades: 9-12
- Enrollment: 1,468 (2017-18)
- Student to teacher ratio: 13.41
- Campus type: Rural
- Colors: Green and gold
- Athletics conference: VHSL; AA Region II; AA Jefferson District
- Mascot: Lion (previously, Rebel)
- Newspaper: The Lion's Roar
- Yearbook: Reflector
- Website: Louisa County High School

Louisa County High School (LCHS) is a secondary school for students of Louisa County, Virginia in the United States. It is the school for students in the county in grades 9-12.

== History ==
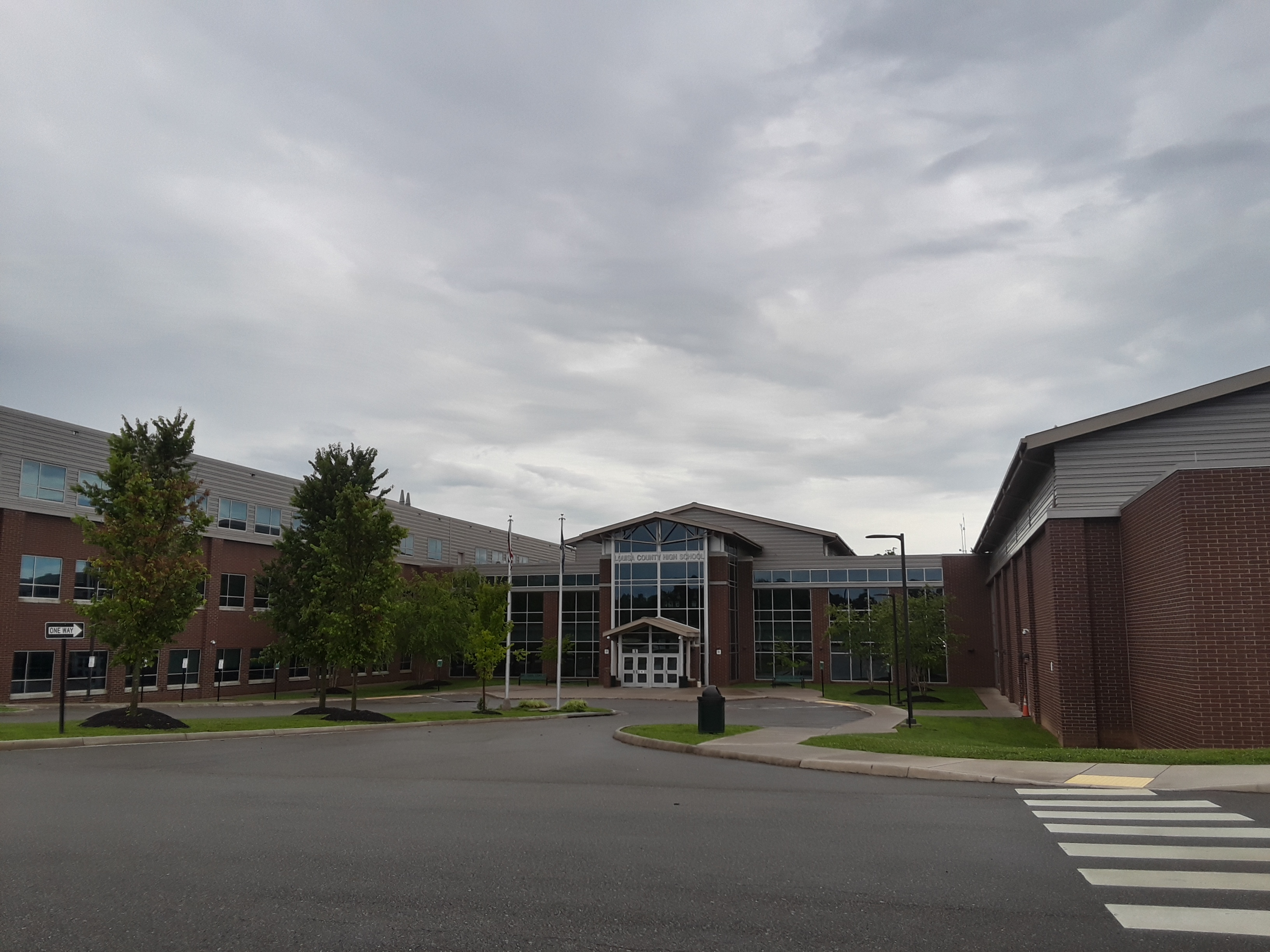
Entrance to the school building, July 2023

Louisa County High School was created by the consolidation of Louisa, Mineral and Apple Grove high schools, opening for classes in 1940. The high school was integrated in fall 1969.

The largest class in LCHS history was the Class of 2009, which graduated 358 students.

The 2011 Virginia earthquake caused significant damage to the school. Following an investigation, the building was condemned. As a temporary measure, the high school students shared the middle school for the next several months. High school students attended on Monday, Wednesday and Friday, while middle school students attended Tuesday, Thursday and every other Saturday. As this was going on, a system of modular buildings were set up in the high school parking lot. From 1 February, the high school students began attending class in the modular buildings. The new Louisa County High School opened in August 2015 in time for the start of the 2015 school year.

== Curriculum ==
The high school offers courses in a wide variety of departments, including alternative education, career & technical education, English, fine arts, foreign language, guidance, mathematics, physical education, science, social studies and special education.

=== Career and technical education ===
Louisa County High School offers many classes that allow for the students to acquire a certification and possibly be scouted by local job providers. The school also provides credits for work-based learning if a student gets an apprenticeship or job that relates to one of the school's classes.

The school also offers several Advanced Placement Program (AP) classes and dual-enrollment courses with both J. Sargeant Reynolds Community College and Piedmont Virginia Community College.

== Extracurricular activities ==
Student groups and activities at Louisa County High School include anime club, band, Ex Libris, FBLA, FCCLA, FFA, SCA, GSA, foreign language club, HOSA, Impact club, Interact, National Art Honor Society, National Honor Society, newspaper, Odyssey of the Mind, Scholastic Bowl, SkillsUSA, Gay and Allied Youth of Louisa, SCUBA Club, Student Organization for Developing Attitudes, Thespians, Tri-M, TSA, Varsity Club and yearbook.

=== Marching and concert band ===
The band at the high school is led by Micah Lee, who mostly teaches the concert and marching band portions of the course. There are also percussion and jazz ensemble portions of the band. The marching band, or the Marching Pride of Louisa as they are called by Lee, perform mostly at the school's football games and statewide competitions. The songs they perform for this year's "Danger" group of songs are "Dangerous" by Michael Jackson, "Danger Zone" by Kenny Loggins, "Imminent Danger" by Jennifer Rose, and "Dangerous" by David Guetta.

=== Athletics ===
Louisa County High School is a member of the Virginia High School League and belongs to the Jefferson District in AA Region II. The school's teams, known as the Louisa Lions, compete in baseball, basketball, cheerleading, cross country, field hockey, American football, golf, soccer, softball, tennis, indoor/outdoor track, volleyball, swimming and wrestling.

Louisa is known for having a heavily supported football program, due to success in the years since 2004, reaching the state championship game in 2006, and winning the Jefferson District Championship in 2010. The football field known as "The Jungle" was awarded the 2011 Best School and Parks Football Field in America.

The Lions have won a few Virginia state titles. The boys' indoor track team in 2009. The Lions have also had luck in baseball, having won a state title in 1990, and cross country in the late 1990s. The lady lions basketball team won the Virginia state championship in 2021. The mainstage team won the class 5C state championship in 2024.
