= Eric Wilson (linebacker, born 1962) =

American football player (born 1962)

No. 50, 59
- Position: Linebacker

Personal information
- Born: October 17, 1962 (age 64); Charlottesville, Virginia, U.S.
- Listed height: 6 ft 1 in (1.85 m)
- Listed weight: 247 lb (112 kg)

Career information
- High school: Charlottesville
- College: Maryland
- NFL draft: 1985: 7th round, 171st overall pick

Career history
- Green Bay Packers (1985)*; Buffalo Bills (1985); Washington Redskins (1987)
- * Offseason or practice squad member only

Awards and highlights
- First-team All-American (1984); 2× First-team All-ACC (1983, 1984)

Career NFL statistics
- Fumble recoveries: 1
- Stats at Pro Football Reference

Eric Wendell Wilson (born October 17, 1962) is an American former professional football player who was a linebacker in the National Football League (NFL).

Wilson was born in Charlottesville, Virginia and played scholastically at Charlottesville High School. He played college football at Maryland, where, as a senior, he was honored by both Football News and the Newspaper Enterprise Association (NEA) as a first-team All-American.

Wilson was selected in the seventh round of the 1985 NFL draft by the Green Bay Packers. He was cut by Green Bay near the end of training camp, but signed with the Buffalo Bills a few weeks later, and appeared in 14 games for them.

Wilson was out of professional football in 1986, but joined the Washington Redskins as a replacement player during the 1987 NFLPA strike. The Redskins went on to win the Super Bowl that year, and in January 2018, 30 years after Super Bowl XXII, the Redskins awarded Super Bowl rings to 26 replacement players, including Wilson.
