= Mac McGarry =

American television host (1926–2013)

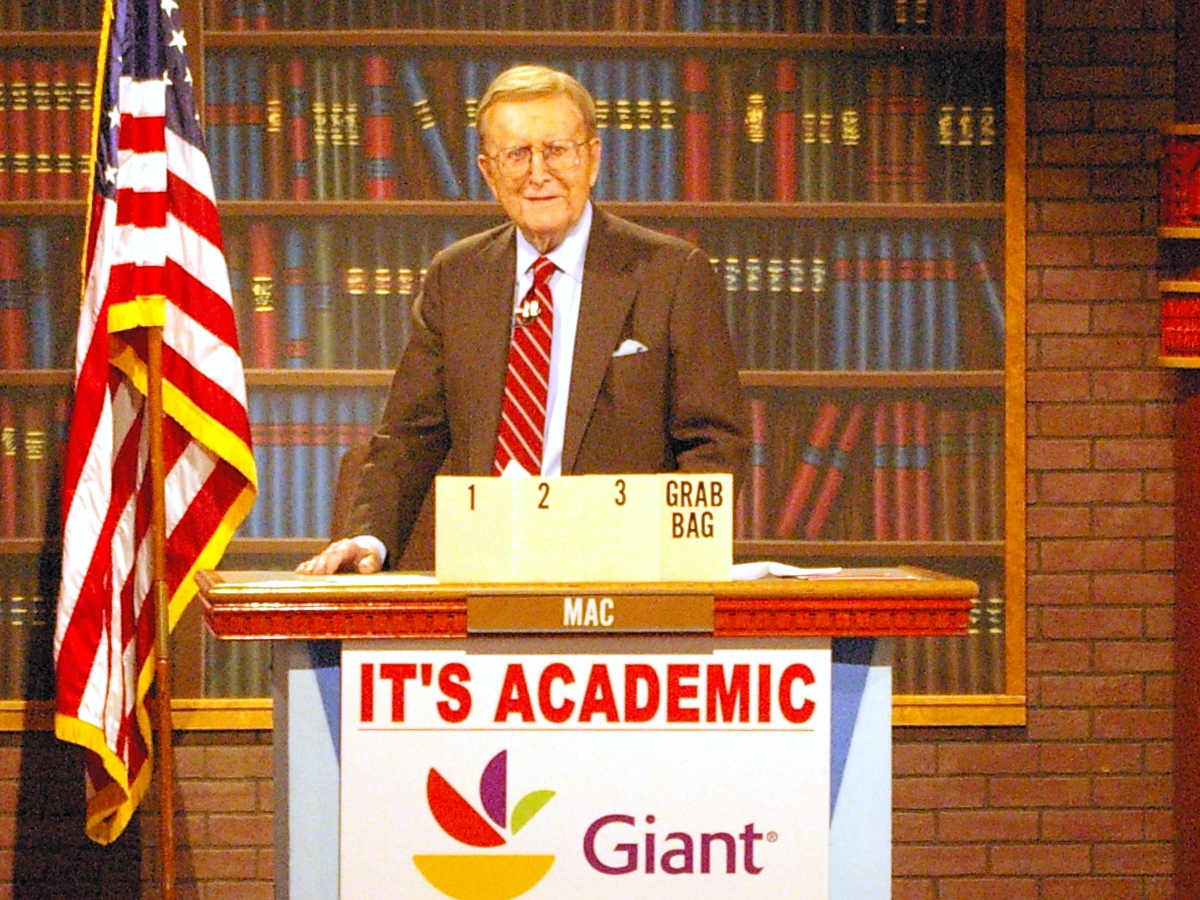
- McGarry hosts It's Academic, December 2009
- Born: Maurice James McGarry; June 15, 1926; Atlanta, Georgia, U.S.
- Died: December 12, 2013 (aged 87); Potomac, Maryland, U.S.
- Education: Regis High School; Fordham University
- Occupation: Television presenter
- Years active: 1950–2011
- Known for: Hosting It's Academic
- Spouse: Babette McGarry
- Children: 4

Maurice James "Mac" McGarry (June 15, 1926 – December 12, 2013) was an American game show host who served longtime as a host of the television quiz show It's Academic. He hosted the show for five decades, from October 7, 1961, when it first aired, until June 25, 2011.

== Early life and career ==
Born in Atlanta, Georgia, in 1926, McGarry attended Regis High School in New York City and attended college at Fordham University. McGarry joined NBC in 1950, working for station WNBW, located in the Wardman Park Hotel. There he worked as the announcer for the NBC radio show American Forum of the Air. During this time, he was also making his first forays into television covering Harry S. Truman's presidential inauguration events for NBC-TV and appearing regularly on NBC's The Big Preview. From that time until the onset of illness in 2011, he hosted numerous talk shows, including In Our Town, the first weekly television program to be broadcast in color.

Some of McGarry's first assignments included announcing news of the start of the Korean War and introducing President Truman from the White House. In the early 1950s, he was involved in early color television experiments. During the 1970s and 1980s, he was the announcer for NBC News Updates originating in Washington, D.C., and over the years also did live booth announcing work for WRC-TV.

== Later years, retirement and death ==
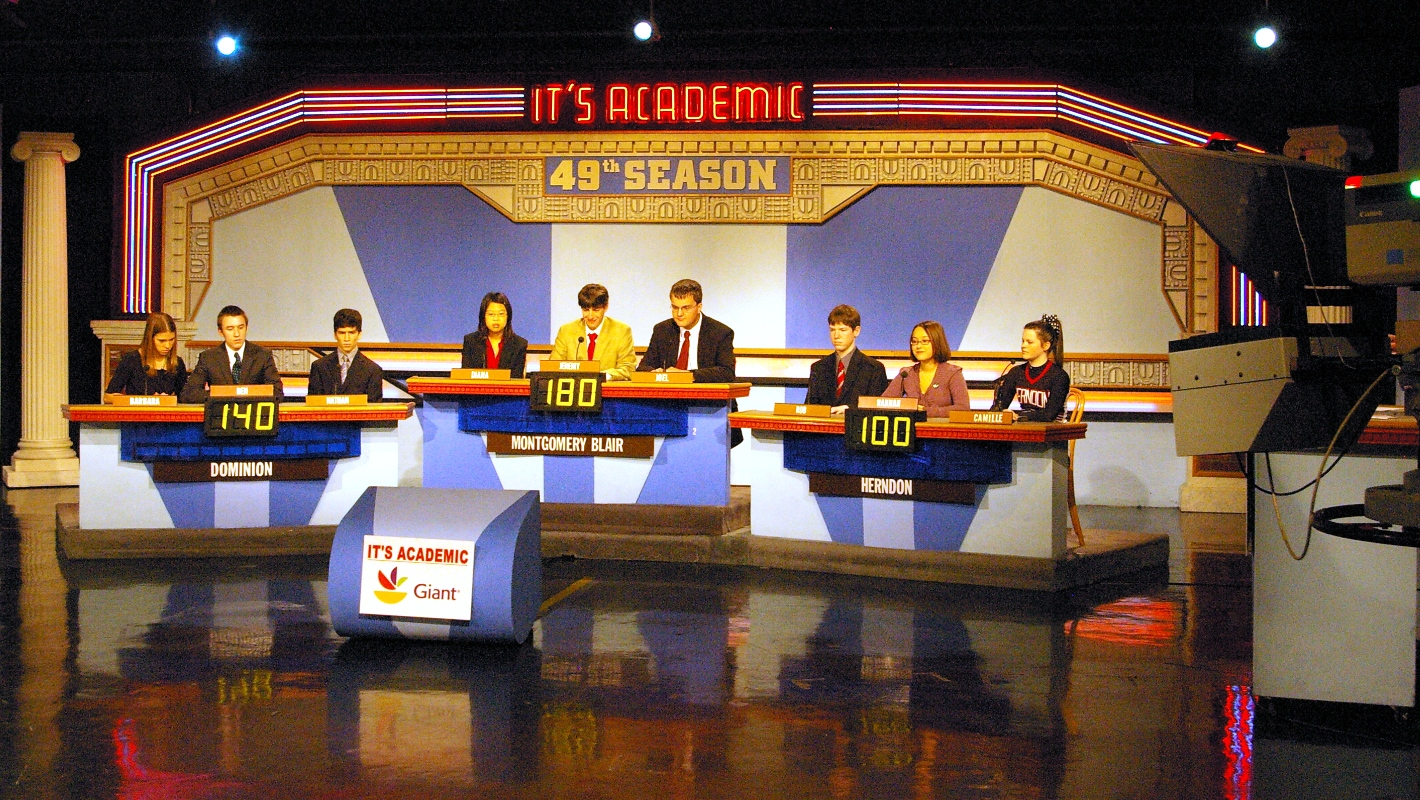
It's Academic being recorded in historic WRC Studio A, December 2009

In September 2011, McGarry temporarily took a leave of absence when he was suffering from a lingering cold. Hillary Howard, a news anchor for WTOP-FM, began filling in for him. Although McGarry's intentions were to continue hosting the 51st season of It's Academic, he announced his retirement in early November 2011 due to health issues. Howard subsequently continued on as the permanent host.

McGarry died of complications from pneumonia on December 12, 2013, aged 87, at his home in Potomac, Maryland, and was survived by his wife, Babette, and their four children.

== Awards ==
McGarry was a charter member of the National Academy of Television Arts and Sciences' (NATAS) Silver Circle. Other honors include:

- Emmy Award for Outstanding Individual Achievement
- Several Mass Media Awards from the American Association of University Women
- The Board of Governors Award from the DC chapter of NATAS
- The America's Role Model 2004 Award from the Olender Foundation
- Marymount University conferred the degree Doctor of Humane Letters, honoris causa, on McGarry in recognition of his commitment to academic excellence, encouragement of young scholars, and outstanding dedication to his profession and community.
