= Jefferson District =

The AA Jefferson District is a district in the Virginia High School League. There are eight member schools. The District is named in honor of Thomas Jefferson, and member schools are clustered around Charlottesville. The District was created in the late 1990s from parts of the Valley and Battlefield Districts, as increased enrollment had forced Fluvanna County and William Monroe to become Group AA schools. Since 2013, the district is used only for regular season, as the members compete in the playoffs at the 3A, 4A, or 5A level.

== Member schools ==
- Albemarle Patriots, Charlottesville
- Charlottesville Black Knights, Charlottesville
- Fluvanna County Flying Flucos, Palmyra
- Louisa County Lions, Mineral
- Monticello Mustangs, Charlottesville
- Orange County Fighting Hornets, Orange
- Goochland Bulldogs, Goochland
- Western Albemarle Warriors, Crozet
