= Charlottesville High School =

School in Charlottesville, Virginia, US

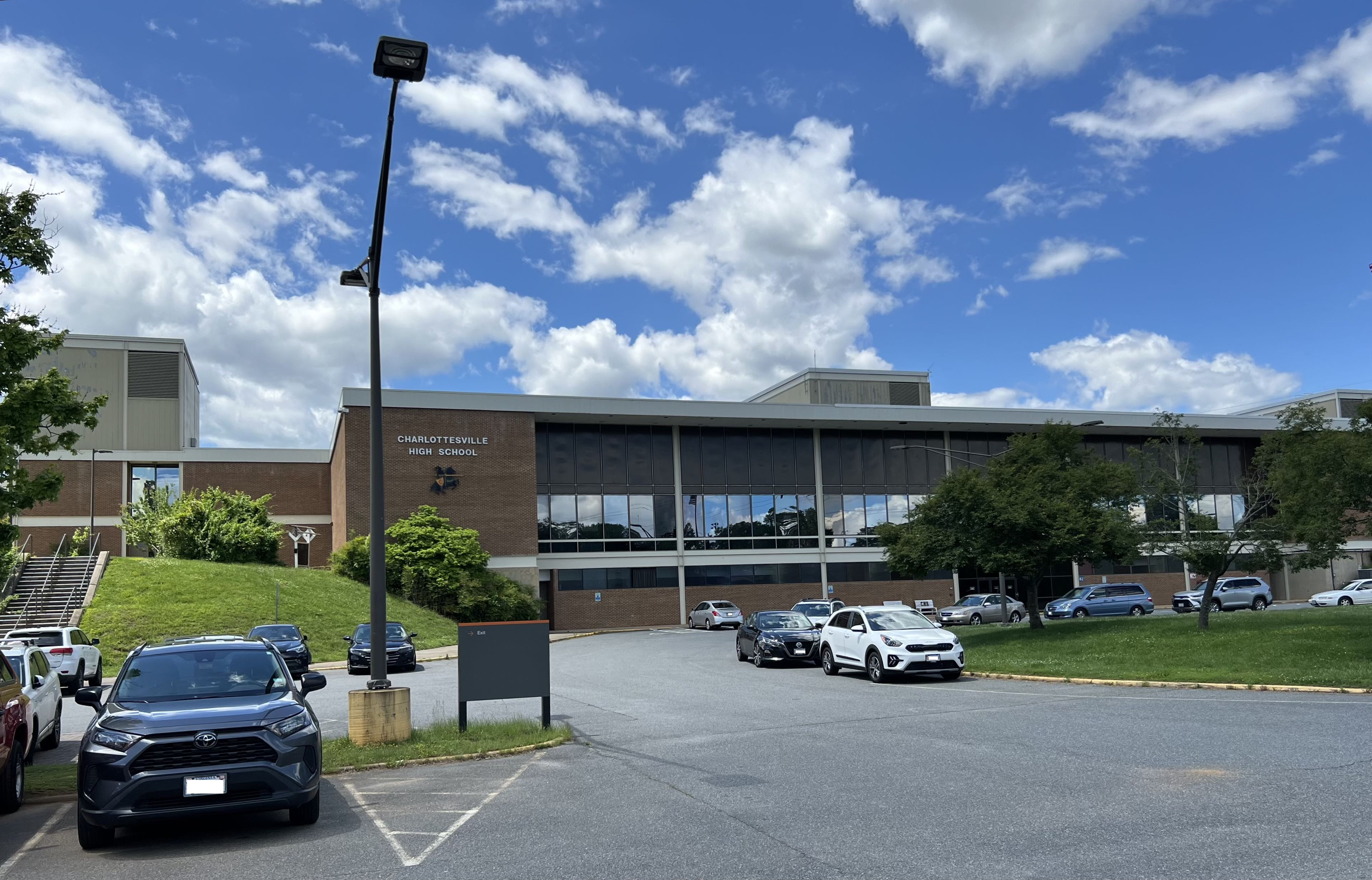

Location
- 1400 Melbourne Road; Charlottesville, VA 22901; United States; 38°3′8″N 78°28′34″W

Information
- Motto: Embrace Diversity and Inspire Dreams
- Opened: 1974
- Locale: City, Small
- School district: Charlottesville City Schools
- NCES District ID: 5100780
- Superintendent: Royal A. Gurley
- CEEB code: 470423
- NCES School ID: 510078000273
- Principal: Justin Malone
- Teaching staff: 114.95 (on an FTE basis)
- Grades: 9–12
- Enrollment: 1,438 (2024–25)
- Student to teacher ratio: 12.51
- Colors: Orange and black
- Athletics conference: Jefferson District; AA Region II; Virginia High School League
- Sports: Baseball, basketball (boys and girls), competition cheerleading, cross country (boys and girls), field hockey, football, golf (boys and girls), indoor track (boys and girls), lacrosse (boys and girls), outdoor track and field (boys and girls), sideline cheerleading, soccer (boys and girls), softball, swimming and diving (boys and girls), tennis (boys and girls), volleyball (girls), wrestling
- Mascot: Black Knight
- Newspaper: The Knight Time Review
- Yearbook: CHS Chain
- Website: https://chs.charlottesvilleschools.org

Charlottesville High School is a public high school in the independent city of Charlottesville, Virginia, serving students from 9th to 12th grade. It is a part of Charlottesville City Public Schools.

It is the second largest high school in the region, with a student population of approximately 1,360. The school grounds include a memorial garden, a running track, ballfields, landscaped courtyards and the Martin Luther King Jr. Performing Arts Center (or "MLK PAC"). Across Melbourne Road lies Theodose Stadium, which doubles as the field hockey stadium during the fall, and soccer and lacrosse stadium during the Spring season.

University Gardens, a University of Virginia family housing unit, is zoned to Charlottesville High School.

== History ==
Charlottesville High School was founded by John Cunningham in 1904 and was built in 1974 because the Lane High School building had become too small to accommodate all students within the city limits. Lane High school saw its last graduating class in June 1974. CHS opened its doors in September 1974. The new school inherited their school colors (black & orange) as well as their mascot (the Black Knight) from the former high school. Lane High School was never demolished and is now the Albemarle County office building. Charlottesville High School's sports complex was still located on the grounds of the Lane High School building until the 1980s, when it was moved to a site across the street from CHS. During the last 20 years of the twentieth century, CHS had some major additions including a new gym facility and a large auditorium.

Renovations started in 2004, lasting two years, and included a fresh coat of paint, updated class rooms, larger and modern restroom facilities, updated ventilation systems, new lockers, and new, asbestos-free floor tile.

== Athletics ==
CHS has many athletic programs, ranging from football to tennis, track and field to field hockey. The boys soccer team won a state championship in 2004 against Jefferson Forest High School. The Charlottesville High School boys soccer team also won the state championships in 2019. CHS Debate Public Forum won the Virginia State Championship in 2022 as well as 2023. CHS also led the golf world of Virginia when CHS Golf won the 2023 VHSL Golf State Championship.

== Performing arts ==
In 1984, the 1,276-seat Performing Arts Center of Charlottesville (PAC) was built to address both the shortage of auditorium space for the high school as well as the area's need for a large venue to accommodate professional touring performances, such as the Richmond Symphony Orchestra, Russian Ballet, and the Charlottesville performance of A Prairie Home Companion. In the fall of 2005, Charlottesville City Council decided to rechristen the Performing Arts Center of Charlottesville as "The Martin Luther King Jr. Performing Arts Center of Charlottesville" (MLK PAC), in order to honor the civil rights activist. Sixty dates during the school year are reserved for school-sponsored events such as assemblies and the school's performing arts program.

== Notable alumni ==
- Will Anderson, vocalist and guitarist for the band Parachute
- Lloyd Burruss, former NFL player for the Kansas City Chiefs
- Mike Cubbage, former MLB player
- Rashard Davis, former NFL player
- Amos Heller, musician, bass guitarist for Taylor Swift
- Larry Mitchell, former MLB player (Philadelphia Phillies)
- David Butt Philip, operatic tenor
- Eugene Puryear, vice presidential candidate of the Party for Socialism and Liberation in the 2008 United States presidential election
- Alex Plank (Class of c. 2005), autism advocate and founder of Wrong Planet web forums
- Brandon Shah, army aviator
- Boyd Tinsley, violinist, mandolinist, and singer, formerly of the Dave Matthews Band
- Alexander Vandegrift, 18th Commandant of the US Marine Corps, recipient of the Medal of Honor and the Navy Cross
- Jeff Wadlow, movie director
- Nikuyah Walker, Mayor of Charlottesville (2018–2022)
- Eric Wilson, former NFL player for the Buffalo Bills
