= Western Albemarle High School =

Public high school in Virginia, US

Coordinates: 38°2′48″N 78°42′24″W

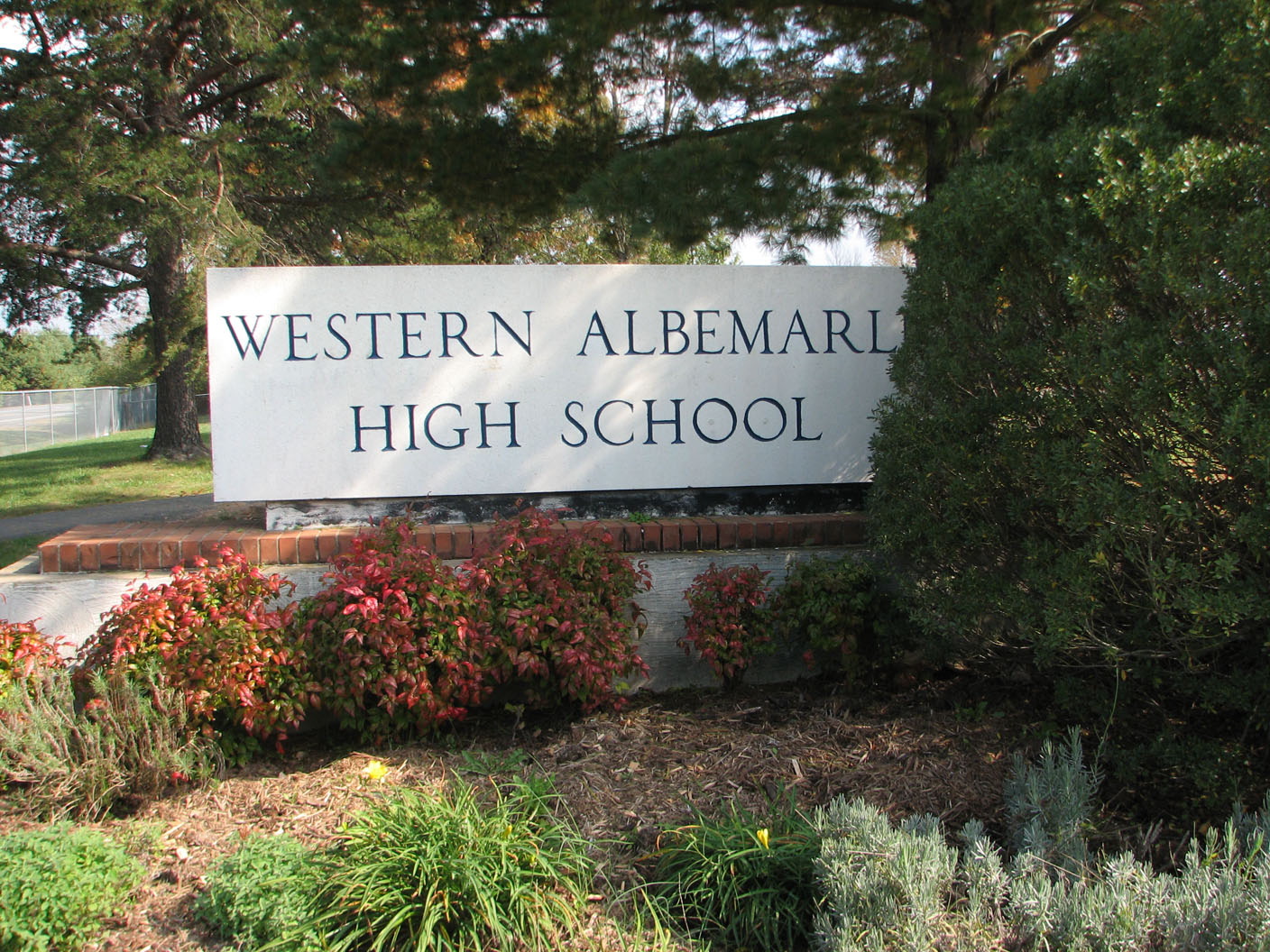
- Western Albemarle High School entrance

Location
- 5941 Rockfish Gap Turnpike; Crozet, Virginia 22932; United States

Information
- School type: Public, Comprehensive high school
- Founded: September 1977
- School district: Albemarle County Public Schools
- Superintendent: Matthew S. Haas
- Principal: Patricia Demitry
- Grades: 9–12
- Enrollment: 1,241 (2021–22)
- Language: English
- Campus: Suburban
- Colors: Blue and gold
- Athletics conference: VHSL Group 3A West Region; Jefferson District
- Mascot: Warrior
- Newspaper: The Western Hemisphere
- Feeder schools: J. T. Henley Middle School
- Website: wahs.k12albemarle.org

Western Albemarle High School is a public high school located in Crozet, Virginia. Western Albemarle is often simply referred to as Western or WAHS (pronounced "woz") by students and locals. The school opened in September 1977.

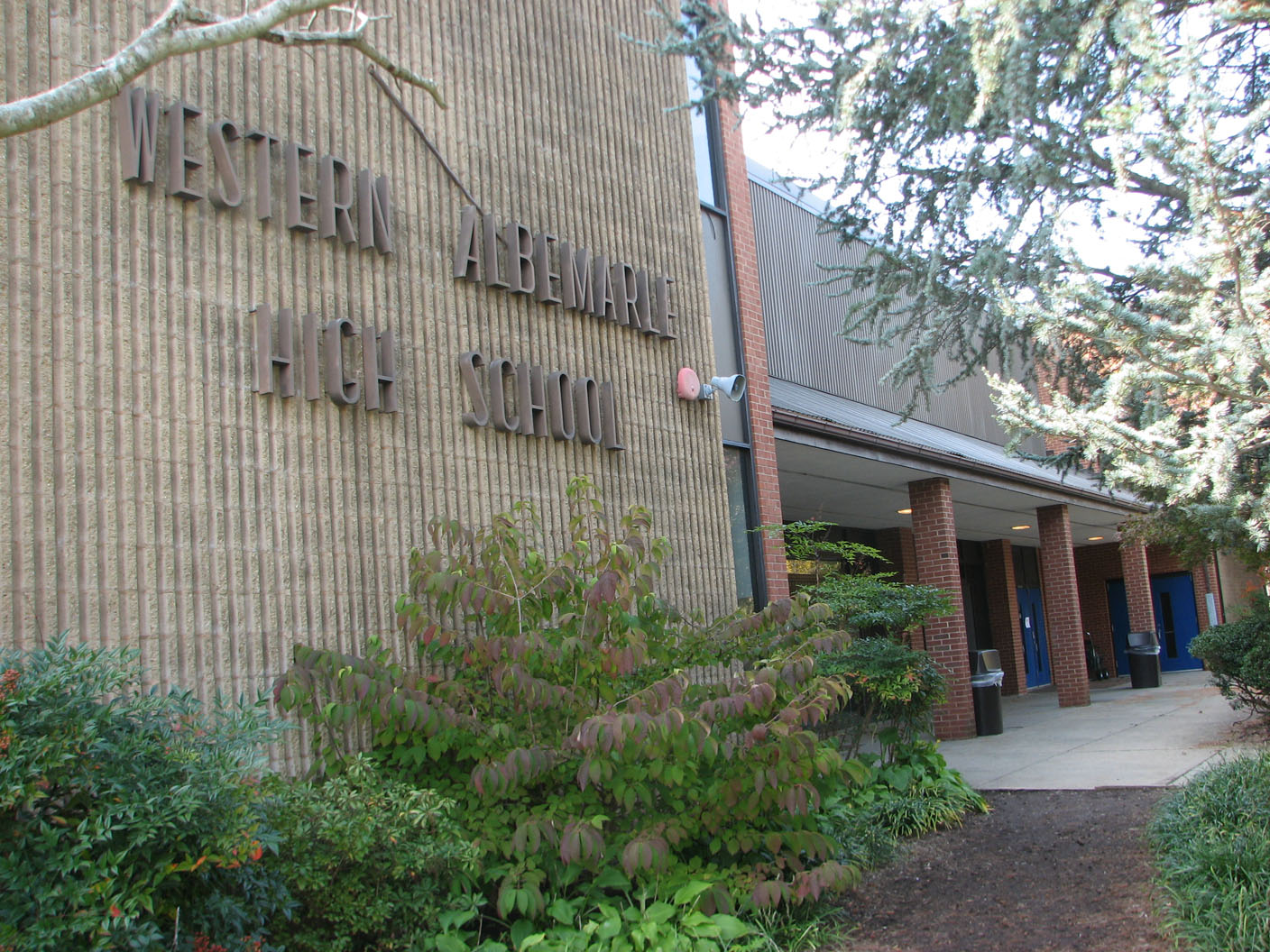
Front Entrance

== School basics ==
Western Albemarle enrolls approximately 1,241 students. It is situated at the foot of the Blue Ridge Mountains on a 75-acre (30 ha) site adjacent to Highway 250 and Interstate 64. WAHS is part of the Albemarle County Public School System, serving the western and central areas of Albemarle County. Its main feeder school is J. T. Henley Middle School.

== History ==
Western Albemarle High School (WAHS) opened its doors to students in fall 1977. Then, the school consisted of two classroom wings (the A and B-Wings), the fine arts wing with the auditorium, band and choir room, as well as a few more classrooms (the C-Wing), and the gymnasium and athletic wing (D-Wing). The building remained untouched until the 1996 academic year when a new addition to the school was opened. This addition added four classrooms and two science labs to the B-Wing and a new auxiliary gymnasium and athletic offices to the D-Wing. In 2005 a new, modern weight room was added to the D-Wing. In 2011, the school received a total overhaul of their athletic field. A brand new AstroTurf playing field and rubber running track was installed using funds from an anonymous donor. In 2015, a renovation to the media center was conducted to enhance student activities as well as modernize the existing, outdated library. The main office was also modernized and renovated to improve school security. In 2016, a new modern greenhouse and classroom was constructed behind the school to be used by Western's STEM academy the Environmental Studies Academy (ESA). In 2017, two history classrooms and two English classrooms (all together in a quad) were renovated to promote Albemarle County's Global Studies concept where the history and English classes are intertwined. In summer 2018, a total renovation and addition of science labs began. Opening in fall 2018 was the school's new Tri-Lab, a large, open multi use space to the building. This space consisted of two classrooms and a hallway that were all connected by knocking down walls and modernizing the whole room. Throughout the 2018–19 school year and summer 2019, construction continued on the new science addition that would soon be known as the E-Wing. During summer 2019, all of the school's existing science labs were renovated and modernized. These rooms, along with the new E-Wing, opened to students at the beginning of the 2019–20 school year.

== Academics ==
In January 2008, it was announced that Western was one of two schools (along with Murray Elementary) in the county that received the Governor's Award for Educational Excellence. Also in 2008, the school was ranked in the top 5% of U.S. high schools by Newsweek. It was also ranked in the top 10 of the state of Virginia.

As of 2024, Western was ranked 44th in Virginia and 1882nd in the nation.

== Athletics ==
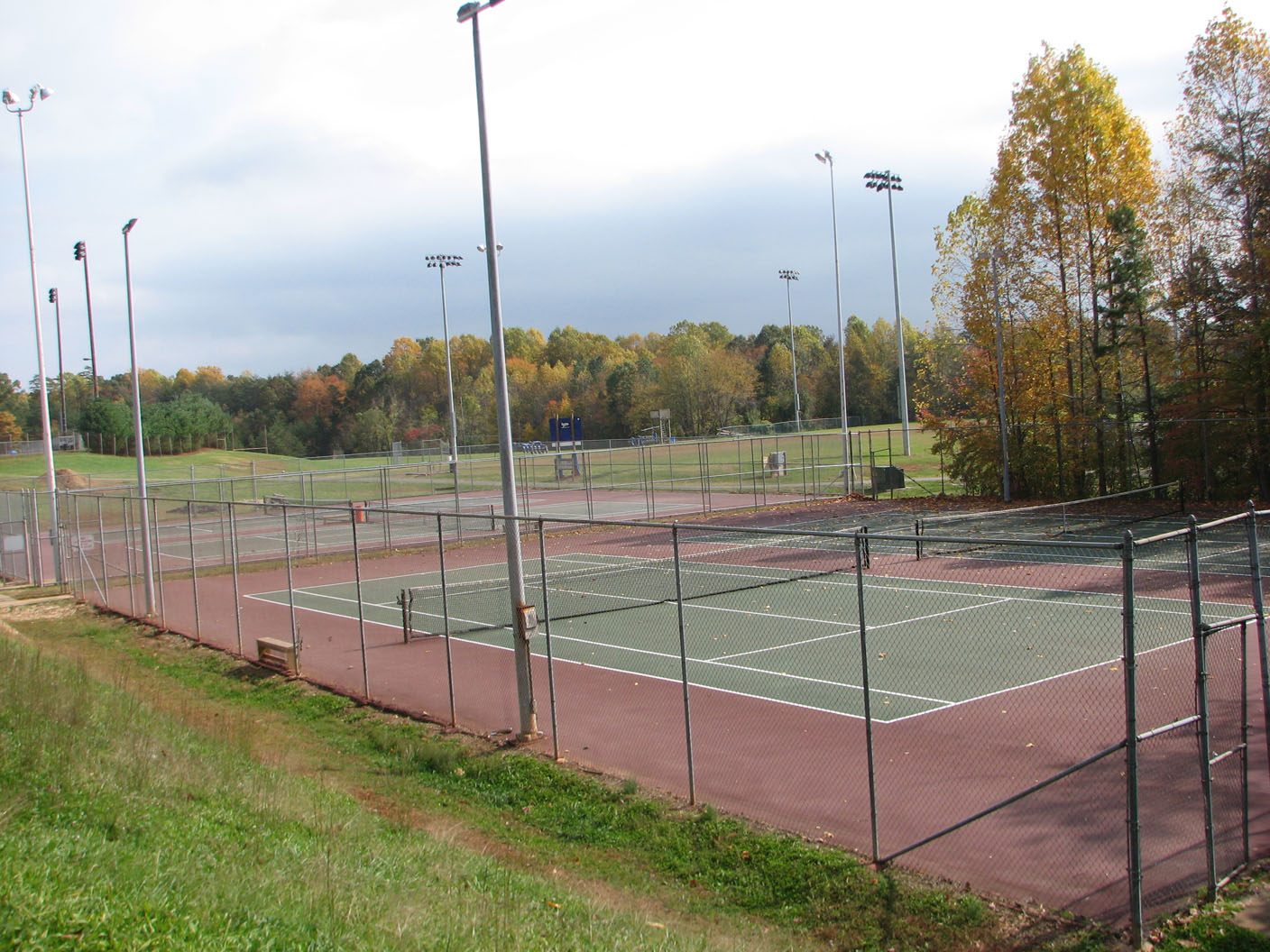
Tennis facilities

Western Albemarle's athletic department has been awarded the Wells Fargo Cup (formerly the Wachovia Cup) five times (2004, 2005, 2008, 2018, and 2019). The cup is awarded annually to one school in each of the Virginia High School League's six divisions that demonstrates the best-overall record in state championship competitions. WAHS broke the record for most points ever scored towards the cup in 2019. The school is a member of VHSL's Class 3 in the Jefferson District.

The boys' soccer team won its fifth state championship in 2022, with other championships coming in 1996, 2014, 2016, and 2019.

The girls' soccer team won their second and third state championships in 2017 and 2018, with the first in 2002.

In 2011, the Western Albemarle track team sent several relay teams to the national track competition. In 2018, the boys' and girls' indoor track teams also won the state championship. In 2017, the boys' and girls' cross-country teams both won the state championship.

In 2004–2005, the school won 21 district, regional, and state championships.

Combined, the boys and girls swimming and diving teams have won 17 state championships, with the girls winning from 2011 to 2016, and in 2019, 2020, and 2024, and the boys winning in 2016, and 2018–2024 with seven straight state titles. The girls' team currently holds the record for the most state championship wins of any swim team in the state of Virginia. The school has produced two Olympic swimmers: Remedy Rule and Thomas Heilman. Rule represented the Philippines at the 2020 Tokyo Olympics, and Heilman competed for the United States of America in the 2024 Paris Olympics, where he earned a silver medal as part of the 4x100 medley relay. Notably, after qualifying for Team USA in the 100 and 200 meter butterfly events, Heilman became the youngest male swimmer in the Olympics since Michael Phelps.

In 2022 the Western Albemarle Crew team—also known as Beaver Creek Sculling—won the Virginia Scholastic Rowing Association State Championships where they won six gold medals in the M 4x, the W Jr 4x, the W Jr 2x, the M Jr 2x, the M Jr 1x, and the M 2x events. They also brought home gold medals in the Girls JV 2x and the Boys JV 2x events at the Scholastic Rowing Association of America National Championships.

== Activities ==
Western Albemarle's quizbowl team placed second at the 2014 PACE NSC In 2014 they also won the VHSL Scholastic Bowl 3A title as well as the NAQT Virginia state championship.

WAHS hosts the Destination ImagiNation tournament for the Jefferson District.

== Bombing plot ==
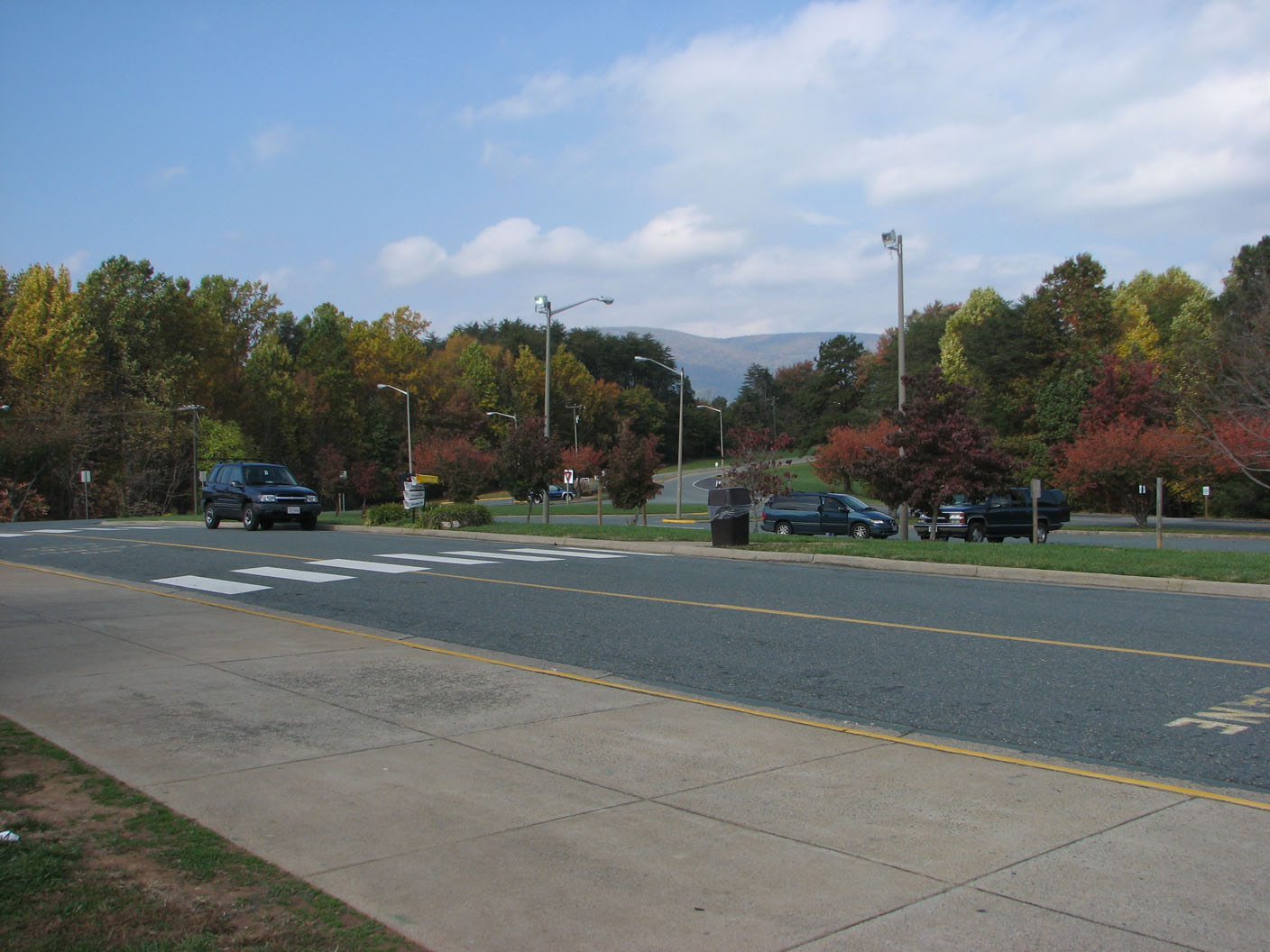
School grounds

In 2006, a 16-year-old Western Albemarle High School student and a 15-year-old Albemarle High School student were arrested after it was discovered that they were plotting to detonate explosives at their schools. The students were both found guilty of conspiracy to commit murder and conspiracy to use explosives to destroy a school house, and both were committed to the juvenile justice system.

== Notable alumni ==
- Billy Baber, NFL tight end
- Billy Campbell, American film actor
- LeRoi Moore, American saxophonist
- Colin Steers, contestant on Season 2 of Bravo's Make Me a Supermodel
- Remedy Rule, Filipino swimmer
- Thomas Heilman, American swimmer
