= Rockville High School (Maryland) =

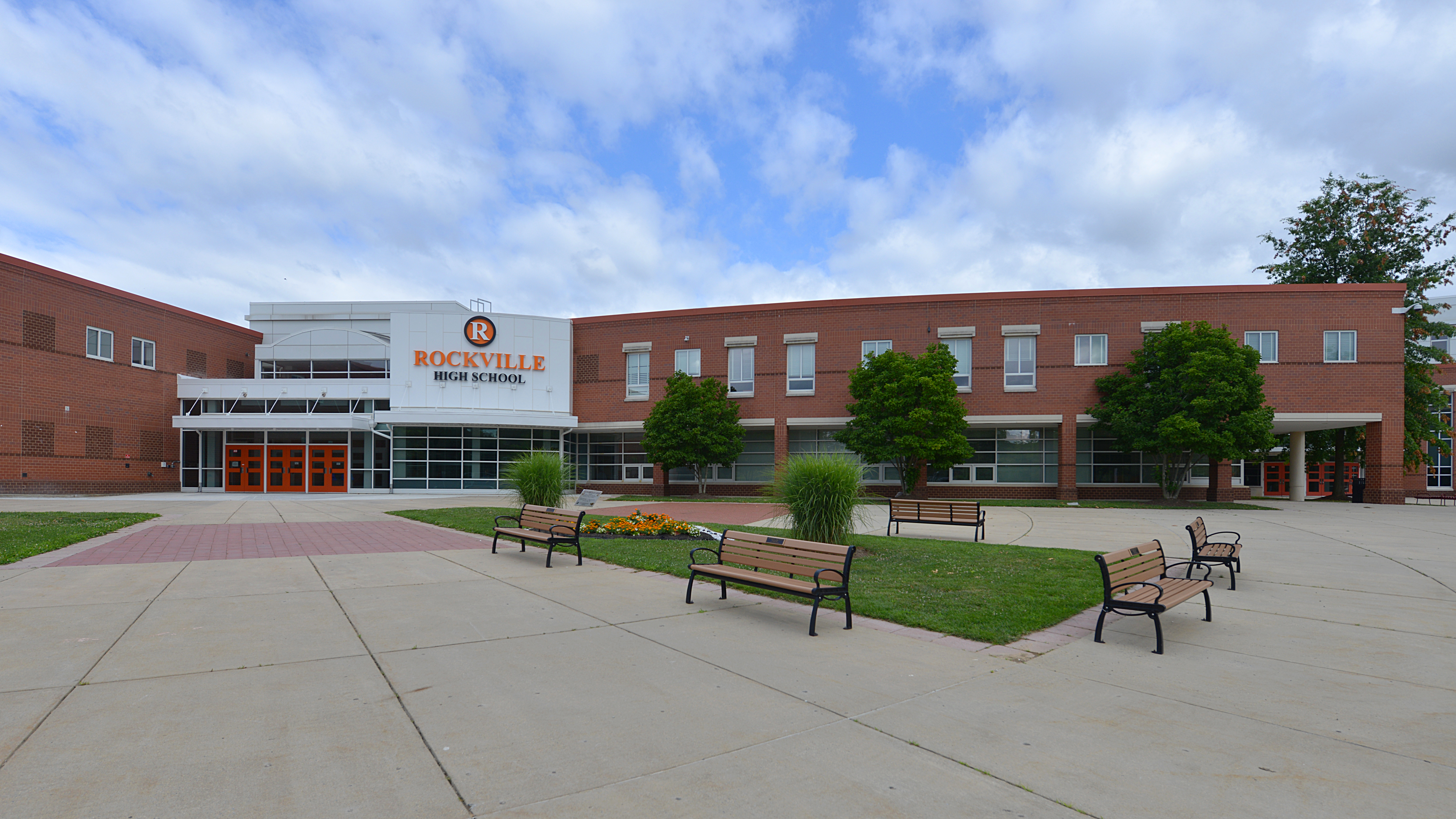

Location
- 2100 Baltimore Road; Rockville, Maryland 20851; United States
- 39.086944°N 77.118056°W

Information
- Type: Public
- Motto: "One School. One World. One Future."
- Opened: 1968
- School district: Montgomery County Public Schools
- School number: 230
- Principal: Rhoshanda M. Pyles
- Grades: 9-12
- Enrollment: 1,516
- Colors: Orange, black, and white
- Fight song: "Hats Off to Thee", "Come On Let's Fight", "Rockville Rap"
- Mascot: Ram
- Rival: Richard Montgomery High School
- Newspaper: The Rampage
- Yearbook: Aries
- Website: Rockville HS official site

Rockville High School (RHS) is a four-year high school in Rockville, Maryland, United States. The school was founded in 1968, and its current building was completed in August 2004. Rockville High School belongs to the Montgomery County Public Schools system. In 2022, enrollment was 1,516 students.

The original building underwent renovation starting in the 2002–2003 school year, and was completed by the start of the 2004–2005 school year. During the two years of renovation, RHS students attended Northwood High School.

== Academics ==
Rockville High School includes programs that give potential college credit to students, such as the International Baccalaureate program and Advanced Placement courses.

The school also offers career driven programs such as the International Baccalaureate Career-Pathway Certificate, Project Lead the Way, and Educorps, where students have the opportunity to intern in school with teachers to help other students.

RHS students average a score of 1003 on the SAT, averaging 517 on the verbal section and 486 on the math section.

As of 2024, RHS is the 51st-ranked high school in Maryland and the 2625th-ranked nationwide, according to U.S News and World Report.

=== Journalism ===
Rockville was the National Winner in the "High School Publication" category of the 2005, 2007, and 2010 Student Publishing Awards, and students were invited to meet Vice President Joe Biden in honor of their award. Rockville won the Gold Crown for high school newspapers in 2010, the Silver Crown in 2006 and 2007, the Silver Crown in online journalism in 2009 and 2010, and numerous Golden Circle awards. The Rampage in 2007 won the National Pacemaker award, and in 2006 and 2010 was a finalist in the online category. The Echoes literary magazine and the Rampage both won the 2009 American Scholastic Press Association publication awards in their respective categories. In 2009, Rockville was the only high school in the nation to receive press passes to the inauguration of president Barack Obama. In 2008, two students received the Courage in Journalism Award for publishing a package of stories about gangs and violence.

== Areas served ==
Rockville High School serves public school students in Rockville and is fed by one feeder middle school and five elementary schools:

- Earle B. Wood Middle School
  - Lucy V. Barnsley Elementary School
  - Flower Valley Elementary School
  - Maryvale Elementary School
  - Meadow Hall Elementary School
  - Rock Creek Valley Elementary School

== Clubs and extra-curricular activities ==
Rockville High School was the only high school in Maryland that had a pipe band. The band originated at nearby Robert E. Peary High School in 1961 and moved to RHS when Peary High closed in 1984. The Montgomery County Board of Education cut the funding for the pipe band after the 2016–17 school year.

== State championships ==
=== Fall sports ===
- Boys Cross Country (1985)
- Boys Soccer (1981, 1983, 1984, 1988, 1991, 1992, 1996)
- Girls Volleyball (1984)

=== Winter sports ===
- Girls Basketball (1987)
- Boys Basketball (1971, 1973)
- Boys Swimming (2023)

== Notable alumni ==
- Lane DeGregory, journalist
- Andrew Fiscella, actor
- Anne Kaiser, politician
