= List of people from Charlottesville, Virginia =

This is a list of people from Charlottesville, Virginia, or from areas nearby to Charlottesville, who were either born, lived or presently live in the city.

Since the city's early formation, it has been the home of numerous notable individuals, including US presidents Thomas Jefferson and James Monroe and author William Faulkner. In more recent times, Charlottesville has been the home of movie star Sam Shepard and musician Dave Matthews.

== Actors ==
- Kathleen Clifford – silent film, vaudeville and Broadway stage actress; born in Charlottesville
- Miriam Cooper – silent film actress; known for her role in The Birth of a Nation; spent her last years here
- Kate Higgins – voice actress, Naruto
- Rob Lowe – Hollywood actor; born in Charlottesville
- Camila Mendes – actress; born in Charlottesville to Brazilian parents

== Authors and academics ==
- Rita Dove – poet and essayist
- William Faulkner – writer-in-residence at the university, to which he bequeathed all of his original manuscripts
- Elmer L. Gaden – biochemical engineer
- Steven M. Greer – ex-physician best known for founding the Disclosure Project
- Henry Hoke – author of hybrid books
- Wythe Leigh Kinsolving – Episcopal priest, writer, poet, political advocate; lived here in the 1940s through 1964
- Don Kiraly – linguist
- Julia Magruder – novelist
- William McDonough – environmental architect, planner, author; former dean of architecture at the university
- William McGuffey – lived in Charlottesville while serving as a professor at the university; buried nearby
- Arthur T. Prescott – educator and founding president of Louisiana Tech University, 1894–1899; lived in Charlottesville 1887–1893, as commandant of cadets at the University of Virginia
- Monica Richardson – editor
- Sara Rittenhouse Brown – professor, author, musician
- Rob Sheffield – author of Love is a Mix Tape, a memoir that takes place in Charlottesville
- Hawes Spencer – editor, founded The Hook
- Victor A. Vyssotsky – mathematician and computer scientist, co-created Darwin

== Businesspeople ==
- Coran Capshaw – manager of the Dave Matthews Band; real estate developer
- Nannie Cox Jackson – prominent African American educator, wealthy property owner and businesswoman; likely African American descendant of Thomas Jefferson
- John Kluge – businessman and philanthropist; lived in Charlottesville for a number of years and built the Albemarle House
- Halsey Minor – entrepreneur, founded CNET

== Government figures ==
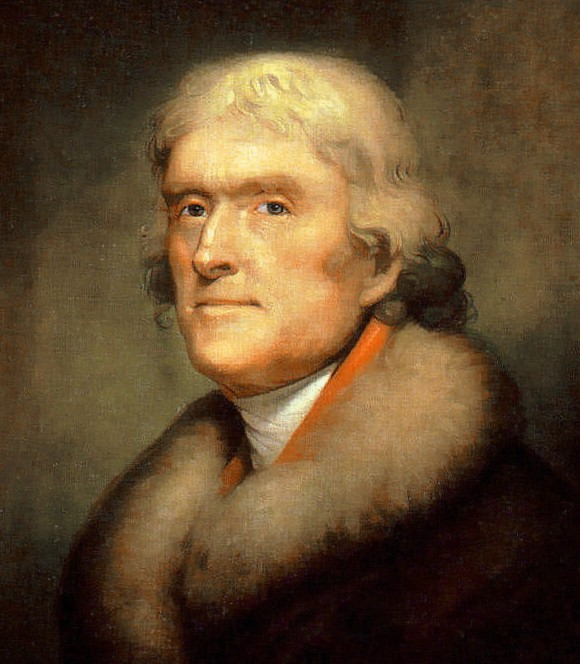
Thomas Jefferson

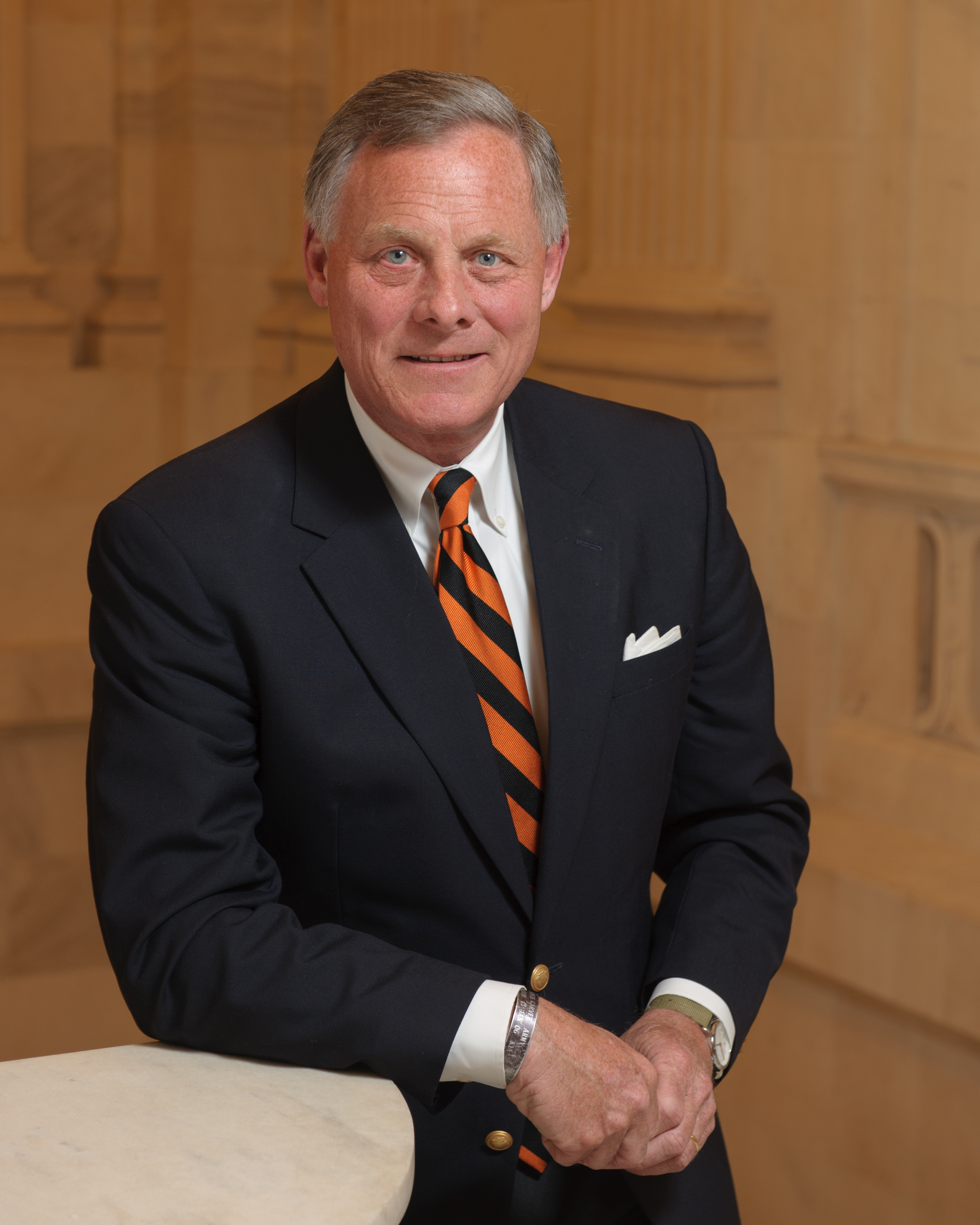
Richard Burr

- Richard Burr – U.S. senator from North Carolina
- Chilton Allan – United States Congressman from Kentucky
- Thomas Jefferson – third president of the United States (1801–1809); principal author of the Declaration of Independence (1776); one of the most influential Founding Fathers
- Meriwether Lewis – explorer, soldier, and public administrator; best known for his role as the leader of the Corps of Discovery, whose mission was to explore the territory of the Louisiana Purchase
- James Madison – fourth president of the United States
- Christopher Henderson Clark – United States congressman
- James T. Farley – United States senator from California
- James Monroe – founding father of the United States; fifth president of the United States; lived at Ash Lawn-Highland, adjacent to Jefferson's Monticello
- James T. S. Taylor (1840–1918), Virginia politician
- Nicholas Philip Trist – author of the Treaty of Guadalupe Hidalgo, which ended the Mexican War

== Musicians ==
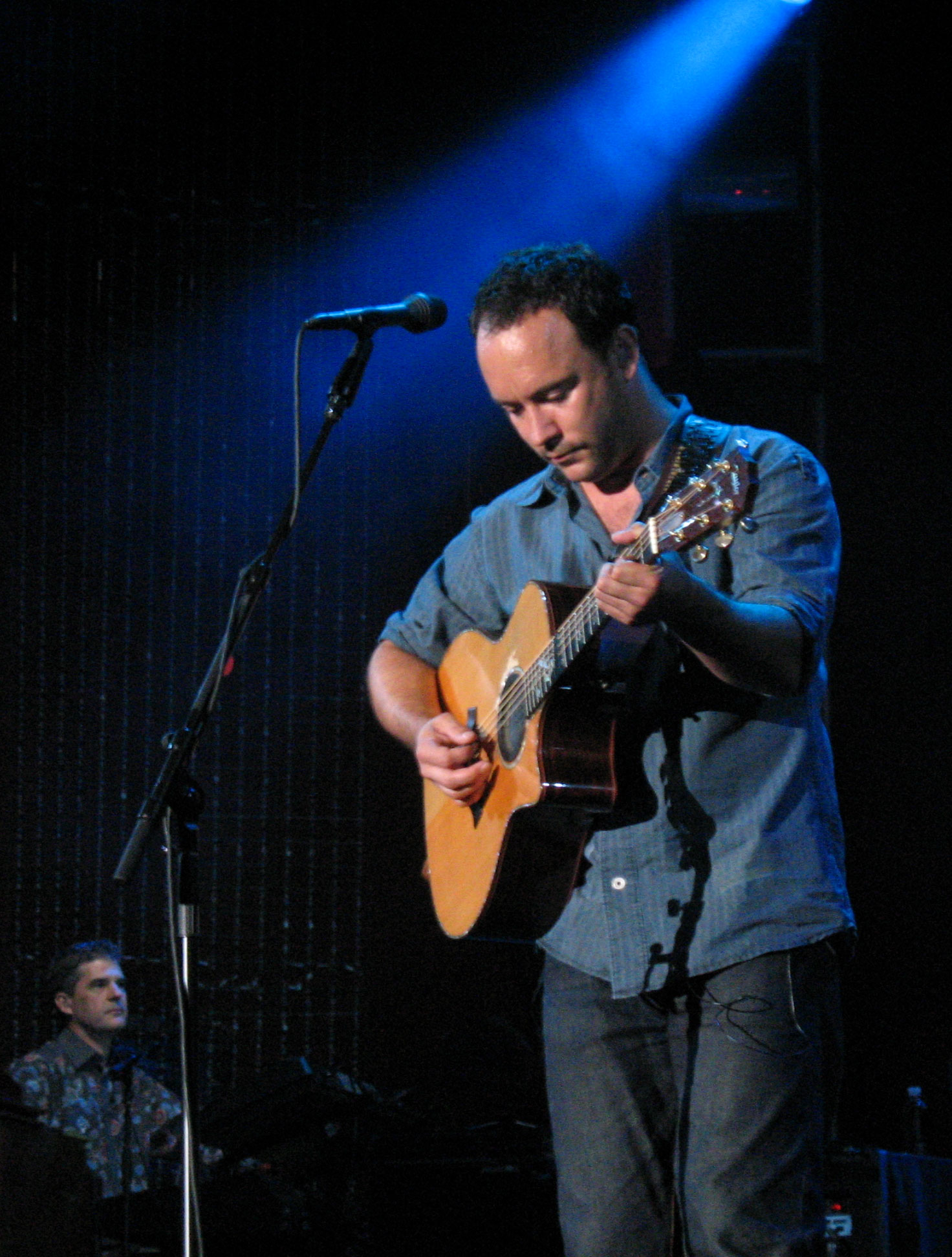
Dave Matthews

- 7th Grade Girl Fight
- Terri Allard
- Hush Arbors – folk and experimental guitarist
- Don Barnes – member of 38 Special
- Carter Beauford – percussionist (drummer) and founding member of the Dave Matthews Band
- Eli Cook
- Bella Morte
- David Berman – member of Silver Jews
- Paul Curreri
- John D'earth
- The Falsies
- Schuyler Fisk
- Brennan Gilmore
- The Hackensaw Boys
- Happy Flowers
- Corey Harris – blues and reggae musician and teacher; winner of a MacArthur Fellowship in 2007
- Greg Howard – Chapman Stick player
- Maxine Jones – an original member of the R&B singing group En Vogue
- The Landlords
- Kara Leona
- Stephen Malkmus – member of Pavement
- Dave Matthews – musician
- James McNew – member of Yo La Tengo
- Pauline Oberdorfer Minor – singer, one of the founders of Delta Sigma Theta sorority
- LeRoi Moore – saxophonist for the Dave Matthews Band
- Parachute
- Tom Peloso – member of Modest Mouse
- Wendy Repass
- Devon Sproule
- Boyd Tinsley – violinist and backup singer for the Dave Matthews Band
- Sarah White

== Sportspeople ==
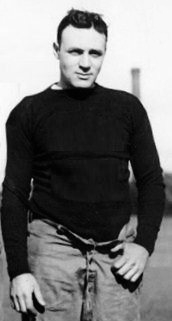
Ralph Horween

- Kenny Arena – soccer player and coach
- Ashby Dunbar – baseball player in the Negro leagues
- Charlie Ferguson – former MLB pitcher for the Philadelphia Phillies
- Larry Haney – former Major League Baseball player for the Baltimore Orioles, Seattle Pilots/Milwaukee Brewers, Oakland Athletics and St. Louis Cardinals
- Ralph Horween – Harvard Crimson and NFL football player
- Chris Long – graduate of St. Anne's-Belfield School; award-winning football defensive end on the 2007 Virginia Cavaliers football team; drafted 2nd overall by the St. Louis Rams in the 2008 NFL draft
- Howie Long – father of Chris Long; TV sports personality; former football defensive end for the Oakland Raiders
- Tommy Toms – former Major League Baseball pitcher for the San Francisco Giants, 1975–1977; born in Charlottesville
- Eric Wilson – former NFL football player for the Buffalo Bills and Washington Redskins

== Others ==
- Anna Anderson – claimed to be the Grand Duchess Anastasia of Russia; lived out her final years in Charlottesville
- Eva Roberta Coles Boone – African-American educator and missionary to Congo
- William D. Gibbons – Baptist minister
- Fountain Hughes – former slave interviewed by the Works Progress Administration to record slave narratives
- Abby Kasonik – artist
- Khizr and Ghazala Khan – political activists and speaker at 2016 Democratic National Convention
- Robert Llewellyn – Earlysville photographer
- Eduardo Montes-Bradley – writer and filmmaker
- John Mosby – known as the "Gray Ghost", a Confederate partisan ranger in the American Civil War
- Alexander Vandegrift – Medal of Honor recipient, first active-duty four-star general in the U.S. Marine Corps
