= C-Ville Weekly =

Alternative newspaper in the U.S.

C-VILLE Weekly
- Type: Alternative weekly
- Format: Berliner
- Publisher: Portico Publications Ltd
- Editor: Caite Hamilton
- Staff writers: 24+
- Founded: 1989
- Headquarters: C-VILLE Weekly; PO Box 119; Charlottesville, Virginia
- Circulation: 24,000
- Price: Free
- OCLC number: 31820304
- Website: c-ville.com

C-VILLE Weekly is an alternative weekly newspaper distributed around Charlottesville, Virginia. Dubbing itself "Charlottesville's News & Arts Weekly," in 2001, the newspaper made over $100,000 in profits.

In 2013 C-VILLE Weekly and other local news outlet Charlottesville Tomorrow entered a content sharing agreement with intent to improve journalism on education.

In June 2020 the newspaper laid off staff. The remaining journalism team was two reporters, a part-time editor, and a budget to hire a copy editor as needed.

== History ==
Hawes Spencer and Bill Chapman founded the paper as a bi-weekly in 1989.

In January 2002 newspaper owners Bill Chapman and Rob Jiranek dismissed Hawes Spencer as editor of C-VILLE Weekly. In response Spencer and some other C-VILLE Weekly staff founded competing newspaper, The Hook. Cathryn Harding became editor in January 2002.

In 2011 the parent companies that owned C-VILLE Weekly and the Hook merged, re-uniting publications which had common origins.

In 2018 the arts and living reporter for C-VILLE Weekly remarked that after the 2017 Unite the Right rally, there was more community support for journalism on local people of color.
