= Király =

Király is a Hungarian surname, meaning king (female Királyné/Királynő).

Origins of the surname include the Slavonic word of the late 1600s meaning "king". It is also a middle high German word, used as a term of endearment, for curly headed individuals.

This pronunciation of Kiraly differs by region. The American pronunciation of Kiraly is "Keer-ah-lee" where the accent falls on the first syllable. The Hungarian pronunciation is /kiraːj/, used by Gábor Király.

Notable people with the name include:

- Annamária Király (born 1985), Hungarian handball player
- Béla Király (1912–2009), Hungarian general and politician
- Botond Király (born 1994), Hungarian footballer
- Don Kiraly (born 1953), American linguist
- Ede Király (1926–2009), Hungarian figure skater
- Gábor Király (born 1976), Hungarian footballer
- Hajnalka Kiraly (born 1971), Hungarian-born French épée fencer
- Karch Kiraly (born 1960), American volleyball player and coach
- Linda Király (born 1983), American-Hungarian singer-songwriter
- Lucy Kiraly (born 1950), Australian fashion model and television presenter
- Mónika Király (born 1983), Hungarian road cyclist
- Pál Király (1880–1965), Hungarian engineer and weapons designer
- Pál Király (athlete) (1896–1969), Hungarian long-distance runner
- Viktor Király (born 1984), Hungarian–American pop singer
- Zoltán Király (born 1948), Hungarian journalist, educator, and politician

== See also ==
- Szent István király, Saint Stephen
- István király, Hungarian opera
- István, a király, Hungarian rock opera
- Király Baths, Hungarian thermal bath
