= Nannie Cox Jackson =

American educator, wealthy property owner and businesswoman

Nannie Cox Jackson (February 26, 1865 – September 19, 1953) was a prominent African-American educator, wealthy property owner and businesswoman in Charlottesville, Virginia.

In addition to her career as an educator, Jackson is notable for being one of the most substantial African-American landowners in Charlottesville, Virginia, as well as owner of one of the first African-American billboard companies in the United States, Jackson Advertising.

== Early life, family, education, Thomas Jefferson genealogy ==
Jackson was born on February 26, 1865, in Charlottesville, Virginia. She was the daughter of Elizabeth Scott (February 19, 1824 – July 15, 1916) and Elizabeth's married enslaver, Dr. William Cox (October 29, 1808 – April 15, 1875).

Jackson' maternal grandmother, Nancy Colbert Scott (1810–1864), was Elizabeth Scott's mother. Nancy Colbert Scott's parents were Burwell Colbert (December 24, 1783 – 1862) and Critta Hemings Colbert (1783–1819). Burwell Colbert was the third President of the United States Thomas Jefferson's enslaved manservant and Monticello estate's butler. Critta Hemings Colbert was the niece of the famed Sally Hemings, President Jefferson's documented, enslaved African American concubine.

After President Jefferson's death in 1826, the Jefferson Estate had accumulated extraordinary financial debts, upwards of $107,000 — more than $2,934,316.80 in 2021 dollars. Much of this debt was attributed to multiple factors: the Panic of 1819, insufficient income from the Monticello's agricultural holdings, and, notably, Jefferson's extensive travel expenses, excessive lifestyle and imprudent financial decisions. In an effort to liquidate family assets to satisfy debts, Jefferson's favorite grandson and executor of his estate, Thomas Jefferson Randolph, sold more than 130 enslaved African Americans and their dear family members. Notably, Thomas Jefferson Randolph sold Nancy Colbert Scott to Alexander Garrett (1778–1860), owner of the 117-acre Oak Hill plantation, Albemarle County, Virginia's clerk of court, clerk of the Circuit Court, the University of Virginia’s first bursar, and Thomas Jefferson's close adviser and executor of Thomas Jefferson's will.

In 1842, Garrett resold Nancy Colbert Scott to her eventual husband, Robert Scott, whom she had nine children.

As history would have it, Jackson's mother, Elizabeth Scott, was not Robert Scott's biological progeny; she was in fact Thomas Jefferson Randolph's biological child. According to her descendants, Thomas Jefferson Randolph impregnated Nancy Colbert Scott, who birthed Elizabeth Scott at the Monticello. Thomas Jefferson Randolph later sold his enslaved daughter to the wealthy Garrett family of Charlottesville, Virginia. Though Elizabeth Scott became an entrusted companion to a Garrett daughter, the Garrett patriarch, notoriously cruel, despised and mistreated Elizabeth Scott. Despondent, Elizabeth Scott escaped from the Garretts' captivity.

After the Garretts' recaptured Elizabeth Scott, the Garrett's patriarch shipped Elizabeth Scott to a slave auction in Richmond, Virginia, selling her to Charlottesville resident Dr. William Cox, who found Elizabeth particularly attractive. Dr. Cox relocated Elizabeth Scott next door to his lawful wife, wife Mary Elizabeth Lacy Cox (1808–1893), in a separate home in Charlottesville, rendering Elizabeth a next-door neighbor, involuntary mistress, and mother of Dr. Cox's second large set of offspring: Nannie Cox Jackson, James Rinaldo Cox (December 10, 1854 – March 28, 1917), Tom Cox, Charlie Cox and William Cox. Dr. William Cox had six children with his Mary Elizabeth Lacy Cox, rendering these children Jackson's half-brothers and sisters: Eugene Montraville Cox (1833–1885), Lucian Napoleon Cox (1835–1862), Adelaide Panthea Cox Comer (1836–1899), Almira Josephine Cox (1840–1927), Azell Donop Cox (1842–1913), and Leroy Wesley Cox (1845–1938). According to Jackson's descendants, Dr. Cox would send children Leroy Wesley and Azell Donop to spy on his involuntary mistress' children to ensure that they were behaving.

Elizabeth Scott lived with daughter Jackson until Scott's death in 1916.

Jackson was married to William Edward Jackson (May 22, 1857 – May 29, 1922), a member of Charlottesville's late 1800s/early 1900s' Republican Party. W. E. Jackson stayed active with the Republican Party until 1922 when state party Republicans racially denied W. E. Jackson and other elected African-American delegates a seat at the State Republican convention in Luray, Virginia.

The Jacksons had five children: W. E. Jackson, Charles Leland Jackson, Helen Elizabeth Jackson, Nannie Gladys Duncan, and Marion Louise Carter. The Jackson Family were considered one of Charlottesville's preeminent African American middle-class families, known as the "Four Hundreds Club". Charlottesville locals believed that after African Americans were emancipated in 1865, several African-American families made a pact to obtain education, own businesses or obtain well-paying teaching and school administration jobs, and buy land. Each plot of land generally costed $400, hence the ""Four Hundreds Club." In addition to the Jackson family, the "Four Hundreds Club" included the Coles, Bells (owner of the J.F. Bell Funeral Home), Tonslers, and Inges families.

The Jackson family lived at 520 Pearl Street in Charlottesville's predominantly African-American neighborhood, Vinegar Hill. In 1939, white city officials intentionally destroyed the home and numerous other structures (including an African American Episcopal church) to construct the white-only Lane High School.

Though not common at the time, Jackson attended the University of Virginia to learn Home Economics, under the guise that she would train African Americans to serve as future maids. Instead, Jackson would take her training to empower her students to live independently, self-sufficiently and with stability.

She also received her education in Washington, DC.

== Education career ==
Jackson served as a teacher at Charlottesville's all-African American school during racial segregation, the Jefferson School (Charlottesville, Virginia). During her tenure there, she taught Industrial Work, and a separate boys and girls Domestic Science class, a coed cooking and sewing class. Jackson also organized and subsidized school's lunch program, though the Charlottesville School Board approved it but did not co-finance it. Organizer of the Jefferson School (Charlottesville, Virginia)'s first ever football team, Jackson was well known for recruiting the football coach, and feeding the school's football players and coaches after each game.

After 46 years in education, Jackson retired in 1939.

== Business career ==
Jackson and her son W.E. “Billpost” Jackson Jr. owned Jackson Poster Advertising, the first African American-ran billboard company in the United States. Operating out of their home at 204 Sixth Street NW in Charlottesville, Virginia, the company began as "Cox Poster Advertising", a company initially owned and operated by Nannie Cox Jackson's brother, James Rinaldo Cox. The company specialized in posting theatrical and national product advertisements on walls and fences. Jackson Jr.'s son, Edward Rinaldo Jackson, expanded the company's advertising to major corporate, local business and charitable outdoor advertising.

As one of Charlottesville's largest property owners, Jackson owned close to 40 percent of the land in the predominately African-American neighborhood, Vinegar Hill. She regularly rented to other African Americans at reasonable rates.

== Death, Net Worth ==
Jackson died on September 19, 1953, in Charlottesville, Virginia, at the age of 88. She was interred at Oakwood Cemetery in Charlottesville. At the time of her death, Jackson's estate was worth well over $1,000,000.

== Legacy ==
The City of Charlottesville School Board named its Jackson-Via Elementary School in honor of Jackson and Betty Davis Via, a prominent white Charlottesville teacher and administrator
