= Repass =

Repass is a surname. Notable people with this surname include:

- Bob Repass (1917–2006), American baseball player
- Rex Repass, American market researcher
- Wendy Repass, American folk singer-songwriter
- Randolph Repass, Founder of West Marine
- Major General Michael S Repass, USA, Ret.
