= Jefferson School (Charlottesville, Virginia) =

Historic building in Virginia, US

- Jefferson School, Carver Recreation Center, and School Site
- U.S. National Register of Historic Places
- Virginia Landmarks Register
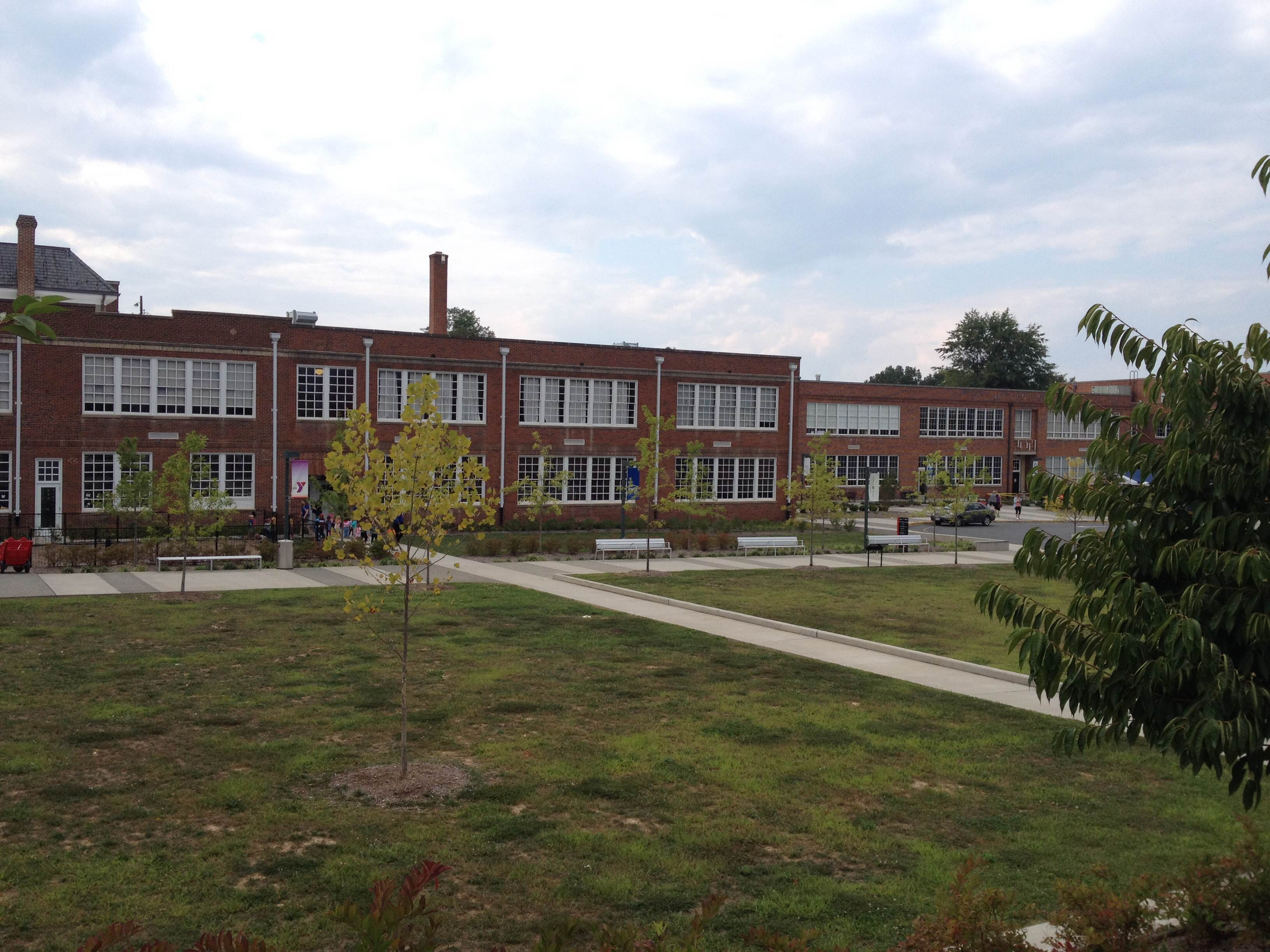

- Location within Virginia Location within the United States
- Location: 233 Fourth St., NW, Charlottesville, Virginia
- Coordinates: 38.0321°N 78.4870°W
- Area: 4 acres (1.6 ha)
- Built: 1926, 1938-39, 1958, 1959
- Architect: Calrow, Browne, and Fitz-Gibbons
- NRHP reference No.: 06000050
- VLR No.: 104-5087

Significant dates
- Added to NRHP: February 15, 2006
- Designated VLR: December 7, 2005

The Jefferson School is a historic building in Charlottesville, Virginia, United States. It was built to serve as a segregated high school for African-American students. The school, located on Commerce Street in the downtown Starr Hill neighborhood, was built in four sections starting in 1926, with additions made in 1938–39, 1958, and 1959. It is a large two-story brick building, and the 1938–1939, two-story, rear addition, was partially funded by the Public Works Administration (PWA).

This building operated from 1926 to 1951 as Charlottesville's first high school for black students. In 1951, it became an elementary school for black students. In 1958, Jefferson School students sought application to local white-only schools, sparking the city government to join the statewide massive resistance movement against school integration. After serving many uses over the following decades, it reopened in 2013 as the Jefferson School City Center, a multi-use facility that houses the Jefferson School African American Heritage Center, the Carver Recreation Center, and local community organizations.

== High School (1926-1951) ==
The school was opened in 1926 after community members petitioned the Charlottesville City Council to create a high school for black students. Before that time, they had attended the Jefferson Colored/Graded Elementary School which ran only through the eighth grade. It was one of six accredited black high schools in Virginia at the time. During the 1937–1938 academic year, sixty-eight children entered Jefferson High School as freshman, but only fifty-four completed the school year; some failed, others dropped out, and one married. At the beginning of their fourth year, academic year 1940–1941, forty students returned to complete their final year. In 1943, there were fourteen teachers, of whom five were male, led by principal Owen J. Duncan, Jr., and 54 graduating seniors, 55 juniors, 56 sophomores, and 63 freshmen. During the 1950–1951 academic year, there were 335 students enrolled from grades 7 to 11.

=== Clubs and activities ===
Before the school closed in 1951, the school had a football team for boys and basketball teams for both sexes. Student activities included French Club, Dramatics Club, School Band, Science Club and Glee Club. In the 1944–45 school year, the Dramatics Club was the largest extracurricular activity at Jefferson High School, with 114 student members. The school newspaper was called The Jeffersonian and included editorial staff, sportswriters, features writers, and advertising and circulation managers by 1941. In 1945, all of the high school's senior class officers were women for the first time in the school's history. Prominent alumni include football player Rosey Brown.

In 1941 the Jefferson High School Music Department consisted of a school band and three organized groups: the girls' glee club; the Singing Privateers, an all-male chorus; and a mixed chorus of sixty voices, representing a combination of the two former groups. The Jefferson High School Band performed for various churches, schools, and clubs. In May 1941 they performed at the Paramount Theater. By 1945 the school band was accompanying the school football team to perform at games in Richmond.

In 1951, Burley High School opened in the nearby Rose Hill neighborhood to accommodate students from Jefferson and other area black high schools.

=== Yearbooks and annuals ===
The Jefferson High School yearbook was named the Crimson and Black, and had a staff of eighteen by the 1944–1945 academic year.

The 1944 yearbook was dedicated to "...The boys of the Jefferson High School who have willingly answered the call of our country and who are serving in the armed forces to bring to our land once more a lasting peace."

=== Library ===
In 1934, a library opened at the Jefferson School for the use of both students and the general public. The project was initiated by the Charlottesville City Council so that the black community would have access to a library.

== Elementary School (1951- ==
The school served black students through the eighth grade beginning in 1951. In 1958, the NAACP filed a lawsuit on behalf of Jefferson School students who sought the opportunity to transfer to nearby white-only schools.

== Integrated Middle and Junior High School (1965-1967) ==
In 1965-1966, Jefferson School housed Charlottesville's 7th-8th-9th grade students. The City School Board had planned to open 2 junior high schools in September, 1965, but because of construction delays, those schools were not ready. So students of the new Walker Junior High School went to Jefferson in the morning, and students of the new Buford Junior High School went to Jefferson in the afternoon. The following school year—1966-1967—Walker and Buford opened, and Jefferson housed all Charlottesville sixth graders, in an attempt, spurred by the NAACP and local organizations, to facilitate the thorough integration of Charlottesville's schools.

== Historic status ==
In 2005, the building was proposed to be added to the National Register of Historic Places, and it received that designation in 2006. Two historical markers in Charlottesville commemorate "The Triumph of the Charlottesville Twelve," three students who integrated Lane High School and nine Jefferson School students who integrated Venable Elementary School, on September 8, 1958, prompting the closures of those schools a few days later.
