= Massive resistance =

Segregationist political strategy

Massive Resistance

Southern Anti-Integration Strategy
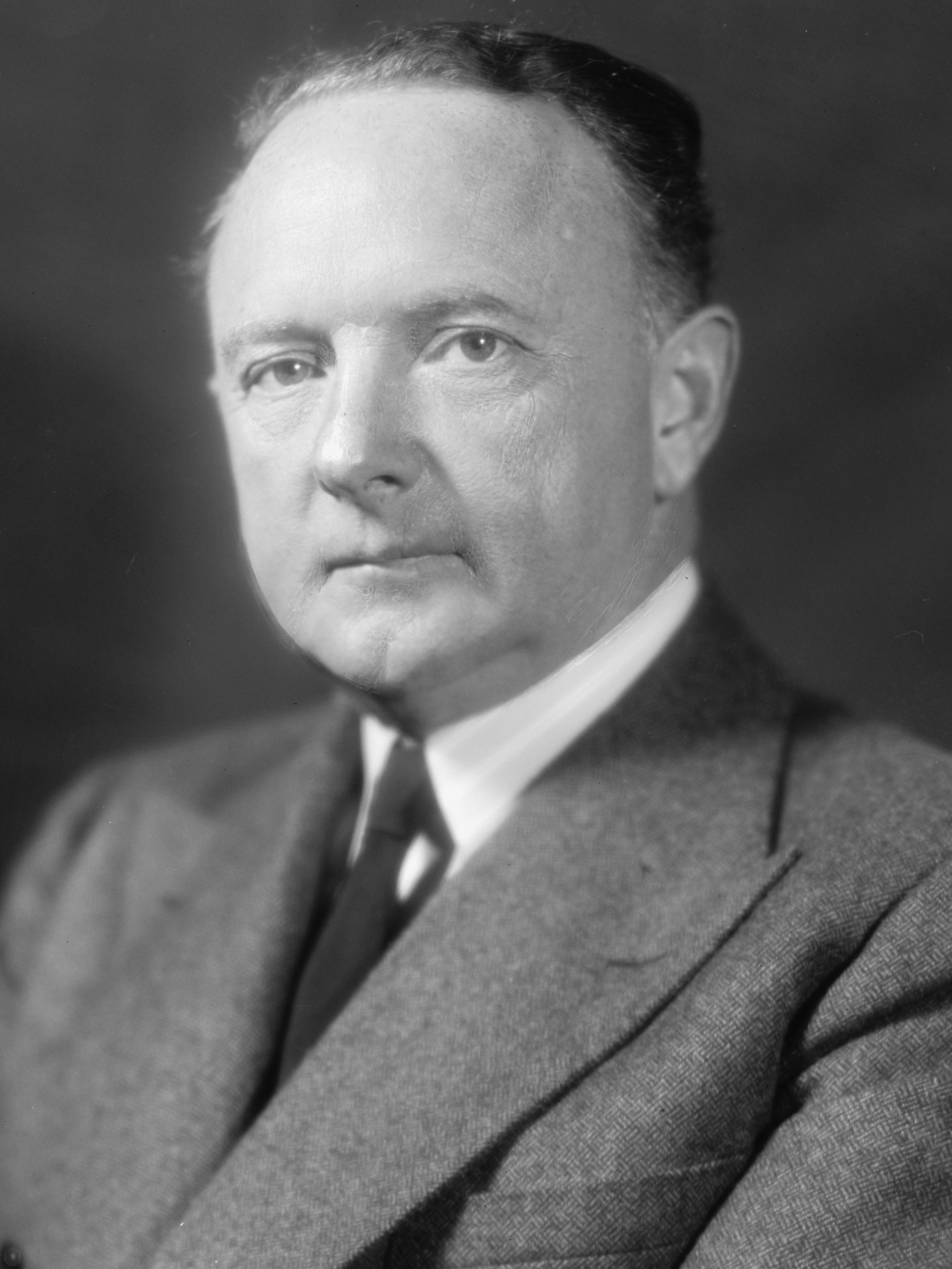
- Harry F. Byrd, a Democratic political figure who created the massive resistance strategy
- Era / Active years: 1956 – early 1970s
- Key architect: Harry F. Byrd Sr. (Byrd Machine / Dixiecrats)
- Core tactics: Public school closures; Defunding integrated districts; "Segregation academies"; Legislation (Stanley Plan)
- Catalyzed by: Brown v. Board of Education (1954)
- Political alignment: Dixiecrats / Southern Democrats (Later leveraged by the Republican **Southern Strategy**)
- Key Ideologies: White supremacy States' rights Interposition

Massive resistance was a political strategy created by American politicians Harry F. Byrd and James M. Thomson aimed at getting Virginia officials to pass laws and policies preventing public school desegregation, particularly after Brown v. Board of Education. Many schools and an entire school system were shut down in 1958 and 1959 in attempts to block integration.

This lasted until the Virginia Supreme Court and a special three-judge panel of federal district judges from the Eastern District of Virginia, sitting at Norfolk, declared those policies unconstitutional. Although most of the laws created to implement massive resistance were overturned by state and federal courts within a year, some aspects of the campaign against integrated public schools continued in Virginia for many more years.

== History ==
=== Byrd Organization ===
After Reconstruction ended in 1877 and the local Readjuster Party fell in the 1880s, Virginia's conservative Democrats actively worked to maintain legal and cultural racial segregation in Virginia through the Jim Crow laws. To complete white supremacy, after the U.S. Supreme Court's decision in Plessy v. Ferguson (1896), Virginia adopted a new constitution in 1902 effectively disenfranchising African Americans through restrictions on voter registration and also requiring racially segregated schools, among other features. In the early 20th century, Harry Flood Byrd (1887–1966), a Democrat who served as Virginia governor, led the Byrd Organization.

Continuing a legacy of segregationist Democrats, from the mid-1920s until the late 1960s the Byrd Organization was a political machine that effectively controlled Virginia politics through a network of courthouse cliques of local constitutional officers in most of the state's counties. The Byrd Organization's greatest strength was in the rural areas of the state. It never gained a significant foothold in the independent cities, nor with the emerging suburban middle-class of Virginians after World War II. One of the Byrd Organization's most vocal, though moderate, long-term opponents proved to be Benjamin Muse, who served as a Democratic state senator from Petersburg, Virginia, then unsuccessfully ran for governor as a Republican in 1941 and became a publisher and Washington Post columnist.

By the 1940s, Thurgood Marshall, Oliver W. Hill, William H. Hastie, Spottswood W. Robinson III, Leon A. Ransom and other black attorneys were gradually winning civil rights cases based upon federal constitutional challenges. Among these was the case of Davis v. County School Board of Prince Edward County, which was initiated by students to protest poor conditions at R. R. Moton High School in Farmville, Virginia. Their case became part of the landmark Brown v. Board of Education Supreme Court decision in 1954. That decision overturned Plessy and declared that state laws that established separate public schools for black and white students denied black children equal educational opportunities and were inherently unequal. As a result, de jure (legalized) racial segregation was ruled a violation of the Equal Protection Clause of the Fourteenth Amendment, thereby paving the way for desegregation and the Civil Rights Movement.

=== Gray Commission ===
A little more than a month after the Supreme Court's decision in Brown, on June 26, 1954, (Note: The decision in Brown v. Board of Education was announced on May 17, 1954.) Senator Byrd vowed to stop integration attempts in Virginia's schools. By the end of that summer, Governor Thomas B. Stanley, a member of the Byrd Organization, had appointed a Commission on Public Education, consisting of 32 white Democrats and chaired by Virginia Senator Garland "Peck" Gray of rural Sussex County. This became known as the Gray Commission. Before the commission issued its final report on November 11, 1955, the Supreme Court had responded to segregationists' delaying tactics by issuing the Brown II decision and directing federal district judges to implement desegregation "with all deliberate speed." The Gray Plan recommended that the General Assembly pass legislation and allow for amendment of the state constitution so as to repeal Virginia's compulsory school attendance law, to allow the Governor to close schools rather than allow their integration, to establish pupil assignment structures, and finally to provide vouchers to parents who chose to enroll their children in segregated private schools. Virginia voters approved the Gray Plan Amendment on January 9, 1956.

=== Stanley Plan ===
On February 24, 1956, Byrd declared a campaign which became known as "massive resistance" to avoid implementing public school integration in Virginia. Leading the state's conservative Democrats, he proclaimed "If we can organize the Southern States for massive resistance to this order I think that in time the rest of the country will realize that racial integration is not going to be accepted in the South." Within a month, Senator Byrd and 100 other conservative Southern politicians signed what became known as the "Southern Manifesto", condemning the Supreme Court's decisions concerning racial integration in public places as violating states' rights.

Before the next school year began, the NAACP filed lawsuits to end school segregation in Norfolk, Arlington, Charlottesville, and Newport News. To implement massive resistance, in 1956, the Byrd Organization-controlled Virginia General Assembly passed a series of laws known as the Stanley Plan, after Governor Thomas Bahnson Stanley. One of these laws, passed on September 21, 1956, forbade any integrated schools from receiving state funds, and authorized the governor to order closed any such school. Another of these laws established a three-member Pupil Placement Board that would determine which school a student would attend. The decisions of these Boards were based almost entirely on race. These laws also created tuition grant structures which could channel funds formerly allocated to closed schools to students so they could attend private, segregated schools of their choice. In practice, this caused the creation of "segregation academies".

School desegregation in the southern states from 1953 to 1976 Note that "integrated school" is defined as a school with at least one white and one black student, thus underestimating the extent of de facto segregation

On January 11, 1957, U.S. district judge Walter E. Hoffman, in consolidated cases concerning Norfolk's schools, declared the Pupil Placement Act unconstitutional. However, this decision was on appeal as the next school year started. Nonetheless, Virginians could see that President Eisenhower was willing to use the US military to enforce federal court orders to desegregate after he federalized the National Guard and sent the 101st Airborne Division into Little Rock, Arkansas, to enforce a similar decision after Governor Orval Faubus ordered the Arkansas National Guard to surround Central High School in Little Rock to prevent the attendance of the black students who became known as the Little Rock Nine. In November 1957, Virginians elected Attorney General J. Lindsay Almond, another member of the Byrd Organization, to succeed Stanley as governor.

=== Closed schools ===
Governor Almond took office on January 11, 1958, and soon matters had come to a head. Federal courts ordered public schools in Warren County, the cities of Charlottesville and Norfolk and Arlington County to integrate, but local and state officials appealed. Local authorities also tried delaying school openings that September. When they opened late in the month, Almond ordered various schools subject to federal court integration orders closed, including Warren County High School, two City of Charlottesville schools (Lane High School and Venable Elementary School), and six schools in the City of Norfolk. Warren County (Front Royal) and Charlottesville cobbled together education for their students with the help of churches and philanthropic organizations such as the American Friends Service Committee. The larger and poorer Norfolk school system had a harder time—one-third of its approximately 10,000 students did not attend any school. A group of families whose white children were locked out of the closed Norfolk schools also sued in federal court on the grounds that they were not being granted equal protection under the law, since they had no schools. Ironically, a Norfolk parochial school, Blessed Sacrament, had accepted its first black pupil in November 1953, even before Brown.

Moderate white parents throughout Virginia that fall formed local committees to Preserve our Schools, as well as conducting letter writing and petition campaigns. When Almond refused to allow Norfolk's six previously all-white junior and senior high schools to open in September, that local parents' group was renamed the Norfolk Committee for Public Schools. In December 1958 various similar committees statewide combined under an umbrella organization called the Virginia Committee for Public Schools. Furthermore, 29 prominent businessmen met with Governor Almond in that same month and told him that massive resistance was hurting Virginia's economy. Almond responded by calling for a "Pilgrimage of Prayer" on January 1, 1959.

James v. Almond was heard in November 1958, and the three-judge panel of federal district judges gave their decision on January 19, 1959, Virginia's traditional holiday celebrating Confederate generals Robert E. Lee and Stonewall Jackson, declaring for the plaintiffs and ordering that the schools be opened. On the same day the Virginia Supreme Court issued Harrison v. Day and found that Governor Almond had violated the state constitution by closing schools, despite the other provision which had required segregation, and which was invalid after Brown. While the Virginia Supreme Court found that funneling local school funds through the new state agency violated another state constitutional provision, it condemned the U.S. Supreme Court's Brown decision as showing lack of judicial restraint and respect for the sovereign rights of the Commonwealth and allowed the tuition grant program to continue through local authorities. Shortly thereafter, Edward R. Murrow aired a national TV documentary titled The Lost Class of '59 that highlighted the Norfolk situation. Nonetheless, Norfolk's government, led by Mayor Duckworth, attempted to prevent the schools' reopening by financial maneuvering, until the same three-judge federal panel found again for the plaintiffs.

==== Charlottesville, Virginia ====
Massive resistance in Charlottesville was prompted when Federal Judge John Paul ordered the Charlottesville School Board to end segregation commencing when schools were to open in September 1956. Twelve students, whose parents had sued for the right to transfer, were to attend two all-white schools: three Burley High School students would attend Lane High School and nine Jefferson School elementary students would attend Venable Elementary School. The students became known as "The Charlottesville Twelve." The decree was received in Charlottesville on August 7, 1956. City Attorney John S. Battle indicated their intent to appeal the decree.

==== Arlington ====
While campaigning in Arlington before his election, Almond had said that he favored a more flexible approach to school desegregation than Byrd's massive resistance. In 1946, when the nearby District of Columbia schools started charging fees for black children from Arlington, the suburban city/county combination with a burgeoning population of federal civil servants had petitioned a special session of Virginia's General Assembly for the right to hold a referendum to become the only Virginia community with an elected school board. In October 1948, the Virginia Supreme Court upheld that new board against a challenge raised by the old appointed board. However, even the new board's policy of building and improving schools proved inadequate given the county's financial limitations; black students were still sent to segregated and inferior schools, including Hoffman-Boston School for the small number of black middle and high school students. A federal lawsuit was initially dismissed by U.S. District Judge Albert V. Bryan, but in June 1950 the U.S. Circuit Court of Appeals for the Fourth Circuit had ordered the county to provide equal facilities for blacks, and equal pay for black teachers.

Arlington's Catholic schools integrated almost immediately after Brown v. Board of Education, with no disorder or public outcry. However, when Arlington's elected school board announced in January 1956 that it planned to begin integration in selected schools, shortly before the General Assembly met, it soon found that the state would not allow localities to determine their own positions on racial matters. The legislature dismantled Arlington's elected public school board, instead allowing the conservative Arlington County Board to appoint school board members. This—with other aspects of massive resistance—delayed Arlington's public school integration for years. County voters (95% white) had voted in early 1956 against the Gray Commission's proposals, although that referendum passed statewide. However, the American Nazi Party at that time maintained its headquarters in Arlington, and it, with the Defenders of State Sovereignty and Individual Liberties (a segregationist group), disrupted school board meetings and distributed tracts against integration.

Arlington's new appointed school board delayed integration, so the NAACP filed another lawsuit in May 1956 demanding desegregation, similar to lawsuits filed in three other Virginia counties. Arlingtonians also formed a Committee to Preserve Public Schools to keep their schools open against threats of massive resistance proponents. This time, Judge Bryan, on July 31, 1956, ordered Arlington's school integrated. However, his injunction lacked teeth. He did not try to circumvent the Pupil Placement Act passed that summer, aware that not only had the Commonwealth again appealed his ruling to the Fourth Circuit (which was also considering desegregation lawsuits from Southside Virginia), the Virginia Supreme Court would soon rule on challenges to the Pupil Placement Act's validity based on Virginia's constitution. Meanwhile, Arlington parents hoped for peaceful desegregation, but believed strongly that northern Virginians should not lead the statewide movement of moderates, but instead jointly resolve their situation with those in Norfolk, Charlottesville and Front Royal.

After the federal and state court decisions of January 19, 1959, struck down the new Virginia mandatory closing law, Arlington integrated its Stratford Junior High School (now Dorothy Hamm Middle School) on February 2, 1959, the same day as Norfolk integrated its schools. The Arlington County Board's new chairman proudly called the massively prepared-for event, "The Day Nothing Happened".

=== Perrow Commission ===
Having lost James v. Almond and Harrison v. Day, Governor Almond publicly reversed his defiant stance within a few months. The special legislative session formed a commission led by Mosby Perrow Jr. of Lynchburg, which issued a report backing acceptance of limited desegregation, leaving the burden on black parents, repealing the compulsory attendance law in favor of a "school choice" program and relying on the Pupil Placement Board to keep desegregation to a minimum. Almond's legislative plan barely passed despite the Byrd Organization's opposition. This earned Senator Byrd's wrath, and after Almond's term expired, Byrd tried to block Almond's appointment as a federal judge by President John F. Kennedy, although Almond was confirmed and served on the U.S. Court of Customs and Patent Appeals from June 1963 until his death in 1986. Perrow also paid a price, for he failed to win reelection, losing to a challenger in the next Democratic primary, although Perrow later served as President of the Virginia State Board of Education.

=== Prince Edward County ===
Despite Davis v. County School Board of Prince Edward County being one of the companion cases in Brown v. Board of Education, Prince Edward County schools took even longer to desegregate. The county's board refused to appropriate any money to operate the schools, which closed rather than comply with the federal desegregation order effective September 1, 1959. It was the only school district in the country to resort to such extreme measures. White students took advantage of state tuition vouchers to attend segregation academies (as discussed below), but black students had no educational alternatives within the county. Edward R. Murrow brought such students' plight to national attention. Finally, in 1963, Prince Edward County's schools were ordered to open, and when the Supreme Court agreed to hear the county's appeal, supervisors gave in rather than risk prison. Then 1964, the U.S. Supreme Court decided Griffin v. County School Board of Prince Edward County, and segregationists could appeal no longer. However, when Prince Edward County's schools opened on September 8, 1964, all but 8 of the 1500 students were black, and observers noted the difference between the black children sent elsewhere for education by the American Friends Service Committee, and those who remained unschooled through the hiatus and became the "crippled generation."

During the county's public school closure, white students could attend Prince Edward Academy, which operated as the de facto school system, enrolling K-12 students at a number of facilities throughout the county. Even after the re-opening of the public schools, the academy remained segregated, although it briefly lost its tax-exempt status in 1978 for its discriminatory practices. White students gradually drifted back to the public schools as tuition at the academy crept higher. In 1986, Prince Edward Academy changed its admission policies and began accepting black students, but few non-whites attend the school. Today it is known as the Fuqua School.

=== Segregation academies ===
Public schools in the Commonwealth's western counties that lie outside the Black Belt, and have much smaller black populations, were integrated largely without incident in the early 1960s. By the fall of 1960, NAACP litigation had resulted in some desegregation in eleven localities, and the number of at least partially desegregated districts had slowly risen to 20 in the fall of 1961, 29 in the fall of 1962, and 55 (out of 130 school districts) in 1963. However, by 1963, only 3,700 black pupils or 1.6% of Virginia's black student population attended integrated schools.

For example, Warren County High School re-opened as a de facto all-black school after no white students enrolled. Their parents had opted instead to send their children to the John S. Mosby Academy, one of many segregation academies—private schools opened throughout the state as part of the massive resistance plan.

Over the course of the 1960s, white students gradually returned to Warren County High School, with the Mosby Academy eventually becoming the county's middle school.

=== Freedom of Choice plans ===
Multiple school systems replaced massive resistance with "Freedom of Choice" plans, under which schools allowed families and students to opt to attend the public schools of their choice. This way, schools were able to comply with court rulings against segregation, while remaining partially or fully segregated in practice.

In New Kent County, a black parent, Calvin Green, sued the county school system to implement a more effectual desegregation scheme. This resulted in the U.S. Supreme Court ruling in Green v. County School Board of New Kent County that freedom of choice plans were unconstitutional.

=== Court-ordered busing: Richmond and back to Norfolk ===
The Richmond City Public Schools had attempted various schemes to avoid integration, including dual attendance zones and the "Freedom of Choice" Plan. After an unsuccessful annexation suit against Henrico County to the north, the city successfully annexed 23 square miles (60 km^{2}) of neighboring Chesterfield County to its south on January 1, 1970, in what the federal court later determined to be an attempt to stem white flight, as well as dilute black political strength. In 1970, District Court Judge Robert Merhige Jr., ordered a desegregation busing scheme established to integrate Richmond schools. However, beginning the following school year, thousands of white students did not go to the city's schools, but instead began attending existing and newly formed private schools and/or moving outside the city limits.

A forced consolidation of the Richmond City, Chesterfield County and Henrico County public school districts was proposed and approved by Judge Merhige in 1971, but the Fourth Circuit Court of Appeals overturned this decision, barring most busing schemes that made students cross county/city boundaries. (Note: Since 1871, Virginia has had independent cities which are not politically located within counties, although some are completely surrounded geographically by a single county. This distinctive and unusual arrangement was pivotal in the Court of Appeals decision.) Richmond City Schools then went through a series of attendance plans and magnet school programs. By 1986, Judge Merhige approved a system of essentially neighborhood schools, ending Virginia's legal struggles with segregation.

In 1970, the Norfolk City Public Schools and several other Virginia communities were also subjected to busing schemes, also returning to more or less neighborhood school plans some years later.

Busing plans were implemented in school districts across the North and South as well. White women, specifically mothers, who were pro-integration staunchly opposed busing. Evidently, the communitarian convictions that upheld massive resistance were not isolated to the South. Massive resistance was formed in response to legislation, yet the motives behind the movement persisted across the country as displayed by protests against busing plans.

== Aftermath ==
Virginia experienced no incidents which required National Guard intervention. In 1969, Virginians elected Republican A. Linwood Holton Jr., who had opposed massive resistance and labeled it "the state's pernicious anti-desegregation strategy," as governor. The following year, Gov. Holton placed his children (including future Virginia First Lady Anne Holton) in Richmond's mostly African-American public schools, to considerable publicity. He also increased the number of blacks and women employed in the state government and in 1973 created the Virginia Governor's Schools Program. (Note: The Virginia and Old Dominion bar associations jointly honored Holton and L. Douglas Wilder (elected to the Virginia Senate in 1969 and Governor in 1990), for those actions on January 24, 2014. Virginia Lawyers Weekly (Feb. 10. 2014)) Furthermore, when Virginia revised its state constitution in 1971, it included one of the strongest provisions concerning public education of any state in the country.

In 2009, as part of their "American Soil Series", the Virginia Stage Company featured Line in the Sand, a play by Chris Hannah. It reflects the emotions and tensions in Norfolk during massive resistance in both the political arena and through the eyes of the students of the "Lost Class".

On July 16, 2009, the Richmond Times-Dispatch apologized in an editorial for its role and the role of its parent company and its sister newspaper, The Richmond News Leader, in championing massive resistance to human rights, acknowledging that "the Times-Dispatch was complicit" in an "unworthy cause": "The record fills us with regret, which we have expressed before. Massive Resistance inflicted pain then. Memories remain painful. Editorial enthusiasm for a dreadful doctrine still affects attitudes toward the newspaper."

At the Episcopal Diocese of Southern Virginia's service of Repentance, Reconciliation & Healing on November 2, 2013, specific mention was made of the actions of C. G. Gordon Moss, Dean of Longwood College in attempting to heal the divisions in Prince Edward County in 1963, and the retaliation he experienced. Several months earlier, the vestry of Johns Memorial Episcopal Church in Farmville, Virginia issued a similar apology during the 50th anniversary commemoration of the school closings.

Most segregation academies founded in Virginia during Massive Resistance are still thriving more than a half century later and some like Hampton Roads Academy, the Fuqua School, Nansemond-Suffolk Academy and Isle of Wight Academy continue to expand in the 21st century. Enrollment at Isle of Wight Academy now stands at approximately 650 students, the most ever enrolled at the school. In 2016, Nansemond Suffolk Academy opened a second campus, that includes an additional 22,000 square foot building for students in pre-kindergarten through grade 3. All of these schools had officially adopted non-discrimination policies and begun admitting non-white students by the end of the 1980s and like other private schools, are now eligible for federal education money through what are known as Title programs that flow through public school districts. However, few blacks can afford the high cost of tuition to send their children to these private schools. In some cases their association with "old money" and past discrimination still cause some tension in the community, especially among non-whites and students of the local public schools. Their racist past may cause black parents who can afford the tuition to be reluctant to enroll their children in these schools.

The abandonment of public schools by most whites in Virginia's rural counties that lie within the Black Belt and white flight from inner cities to suburbs after the failure of "Massive Resistance" has ultimately led to increasingly racially and economically isolated public schools in Virginia. In total, as of 2016 there were 74,515 students in these isolated schools, including 17 percent of all black students in Virginia's public schools and 8 percent of all Hispanic students. Many of these isolated schools are inner city schools in Richmond, Norfolk, Petersburg, Roanoke, and Newport News. In contrast, less than 1 percent of Virginia's non-Hispanic white students attended these isolated schools.

== See also ==
- White backlash
- Resistance to diversity efforts in organizations
- Strom Thurmond filibuster of the Civil Rights Act of 1957
