= Lane High School =

Historic building in Virginia, US

Coordinates: 38°02′04″N 78°29′03″W

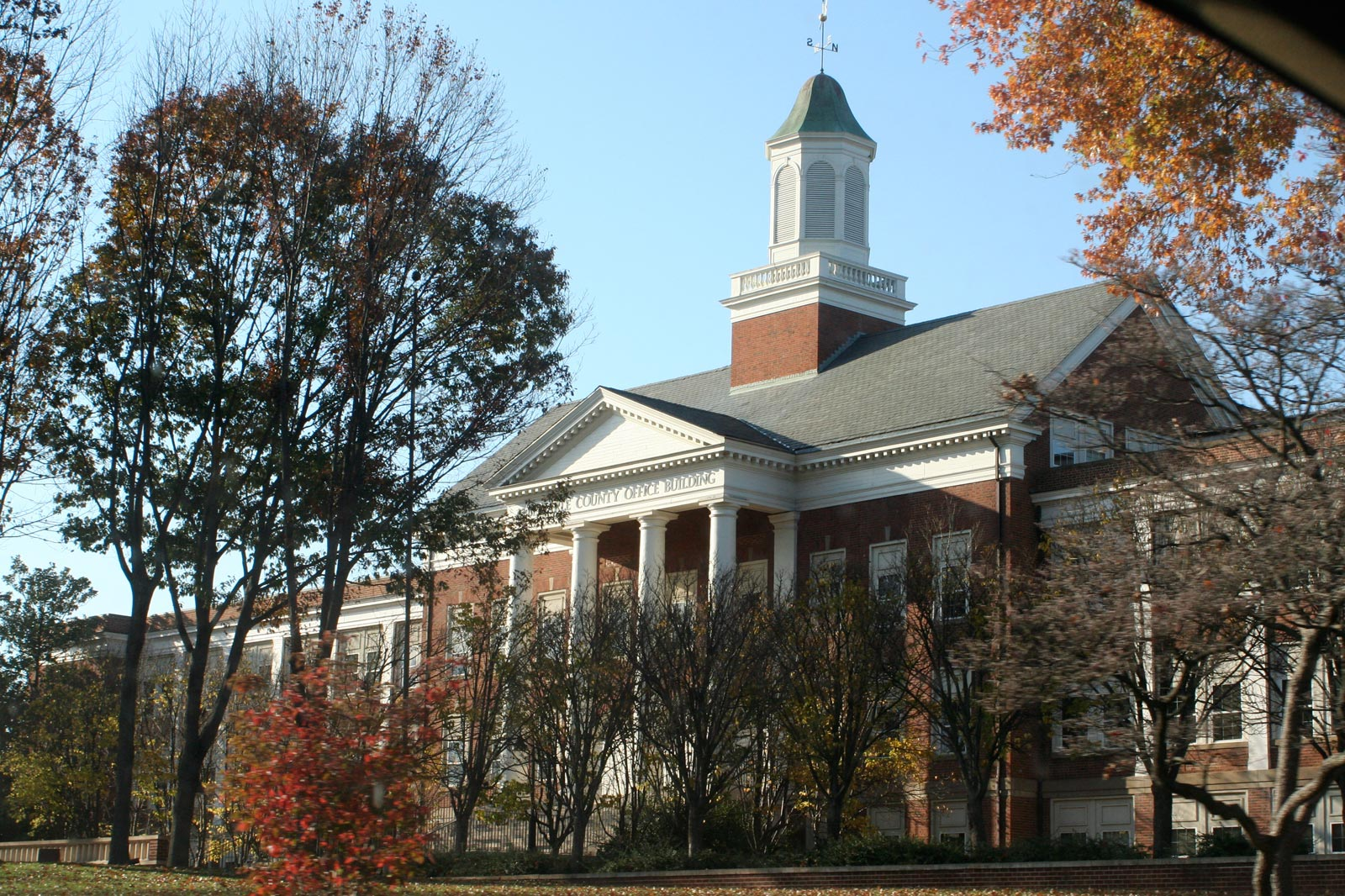
- Lane High School in its modern incarnation as the Albemarle County Office Building

Location
- 401 McIntire Road; Charlottesville, Virginia 22902; United States

Information
- Opened: 1940
- Closed: 1974
- Grades: 9-12
- Colors: Orange and black
- Sports: Football, basketball, baseball, gymnastics, wrestling.
- Mascot: Black Knight
- Publication: Bumble Bee (magazine)
- Newspaper: Lane Times
- Yearbook: The Chain

Lane High School, in Charlottesville, Virginia, was a public secondary school serving residents of Charlottesville from 1940 until 1974. It was an all-white school until its court-ordered integration in 1959. Black students formerly attended Burley High School. When Lane became too small to accommodate the student body, it was replaced by Charlottesville High School. In 1981, the building was converted for use as the Albemarle County Office Building, for which it has remained in use until the present day.

The structure was designed by Lynchburg, Virginia architect Pendleton Scott Clark. African American homes and African-American Episcopal chapel were removed to make way for the school. It was named after the former teacher and school superintendent James Waller Lane.

== Massive resistance ==
On September 10, 1958, federal courts ordered public schools in Charlottesville to integrate their racially segregated schools. In response, Virginia Governor J. Lindsay Almond ordered nine schools in Virginia to close, including Lane, under the authority of a series of state laws known as the Stanley Plan, a part of the state's Massive Resistance policy. The school remained closed from September 19, 1958, until February 4, 1959, when Governor Almond reversed the state's policy and ordered the schools reopened and integrated. During this period, "local residents were subjected to emotional appeals, threats, and predictions of dire consequences representing all points of view concerning segregation." Three African American students enrolled at Lane on September 8, 1959 without incident. Historian John Hammond Moore believes that the process of integrating Lane extended until approximately 1969, writing that it "was characterized by racial friction in some schools, notably Lane, but little actual violence."

== Integration era ==
In the late 1960s, left-wing students at Lane formed a Student Liberation Union. Issues of Blast, a photocopied radical newspaper, circulated among the student body. It was named after the famous modernist publication, Blast. This joined Lanetime, the mainstream student newspaper. Blast contained mostly anonymous articles on a range of topics, including city politics, national activism, and censorship, and brought the national conversation about race and civil rights to Charlottesville's high school students. In the first issue, an article by "LeRoi" announced, "Just as the oppressor must do in Vietnam, in the Ghetto, in the United States, and here at Lane High, he must allow the oppressed to determine their own destiny. And this is not a request; this is a demand. The blacks will achieve this through Black Power and in the Third World."

== Athletics ==
Lane High School's football program is legendary in Charlottesville for its football team's 53-game winning streak, from 1962-7 under the coaching of Tommy "The Golden Greek" Theodose.

== Notable alumni ==
- Mike Cubbage, American major league baseball player and manager of the New York Mets in 1991. Was also interim manager of Boston Red Sox in spring training 2002.
- Staige Blackford, editor of Virginia Quarterly Review and press secretary to Virginia Governor Linwood Holton
