= The Falsies =

American theatrical punk band

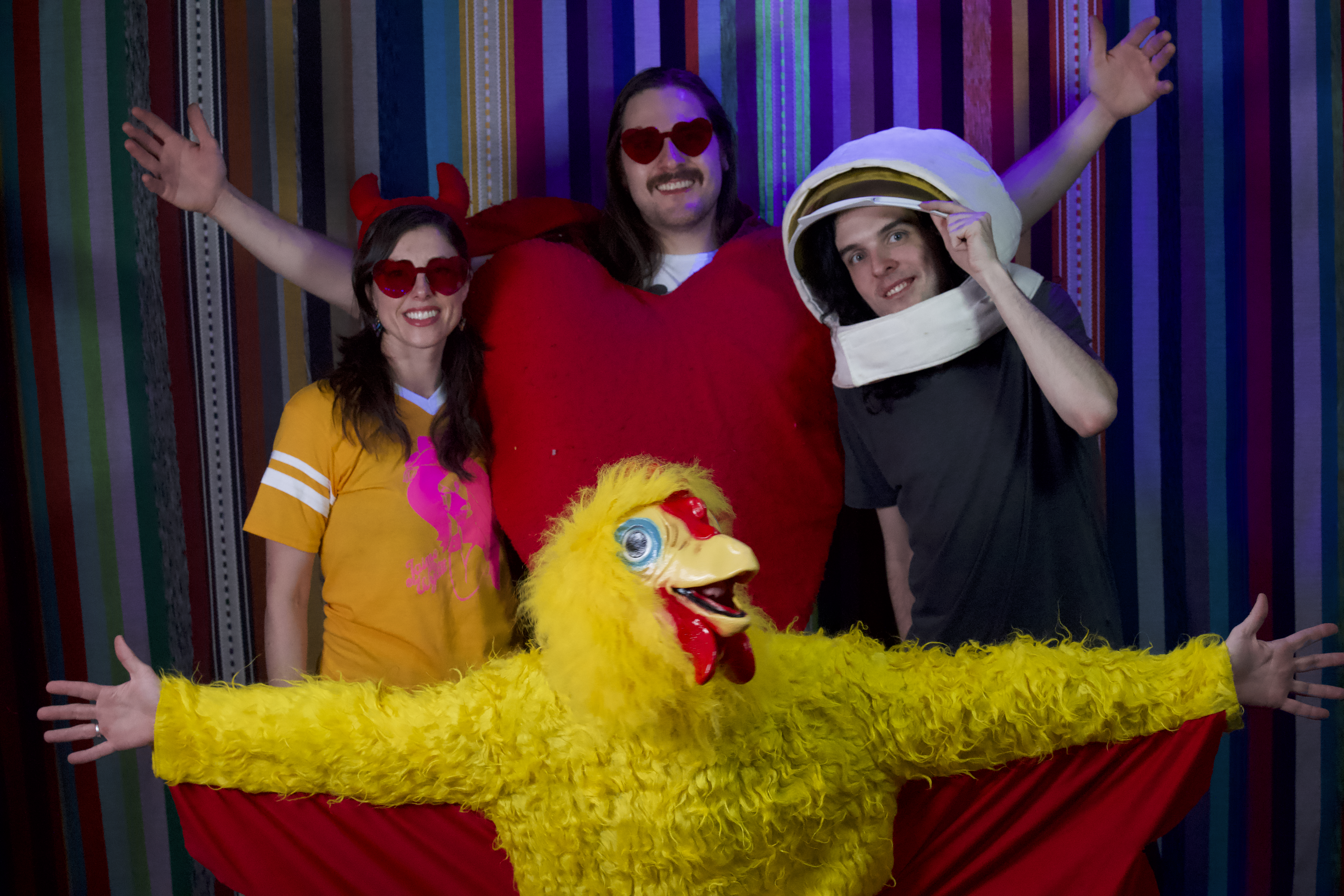
- Left to right - Carter Lewis, Francisco Davilla, Hunter Bruton, with Lance Brenner in front

Background information
- Origin: Charlottesville, Virginia
- Genre: Theatrical punk
- Years active: 2005-present
- Members: Lance Brenner; Carter Lewis; Hunter Bruton; Francisco Davilla; Ayla Olivari

The Falsies are a theatrical punk band established in 2005 and based in Charlottesville, Virginia. The band members are multi-instrumentalists. Performances by The Falsies include costumes and have been described as absurdist.

Their popular songs include "We're More Rock n Roll Than You!" and "Are You Sexually Available?"

== Description ==
The Falsies describe their music as "theatrical punk" and "absurdist rock". The band frequently performs with a choir of backing vocalists dubbed "Satan's Choir." The band's leader Lance Brenner often performs dressed as a chicken. Other members also wear costumes.

Charlottesville radio station WTJU described The Falsies as "legendary". The Falsies are among the featured performers whom photographer Rich Tarbell documented as representative of Charlottesville's music scene.

Themes of the band's music include love and "trying to make meaning in the inherently meaningless world". They describe themselves as being inspired by theatre of the absurd.

In 2009, Falsies members Peter Markush, Josh Davis, Jessi Giannini, Morgan Moran, and Lance Brenner starred in the horror-comedy musical Eat Me: The Musical, directed by Brian Wimer, which featured some of their songs.

== Members ==
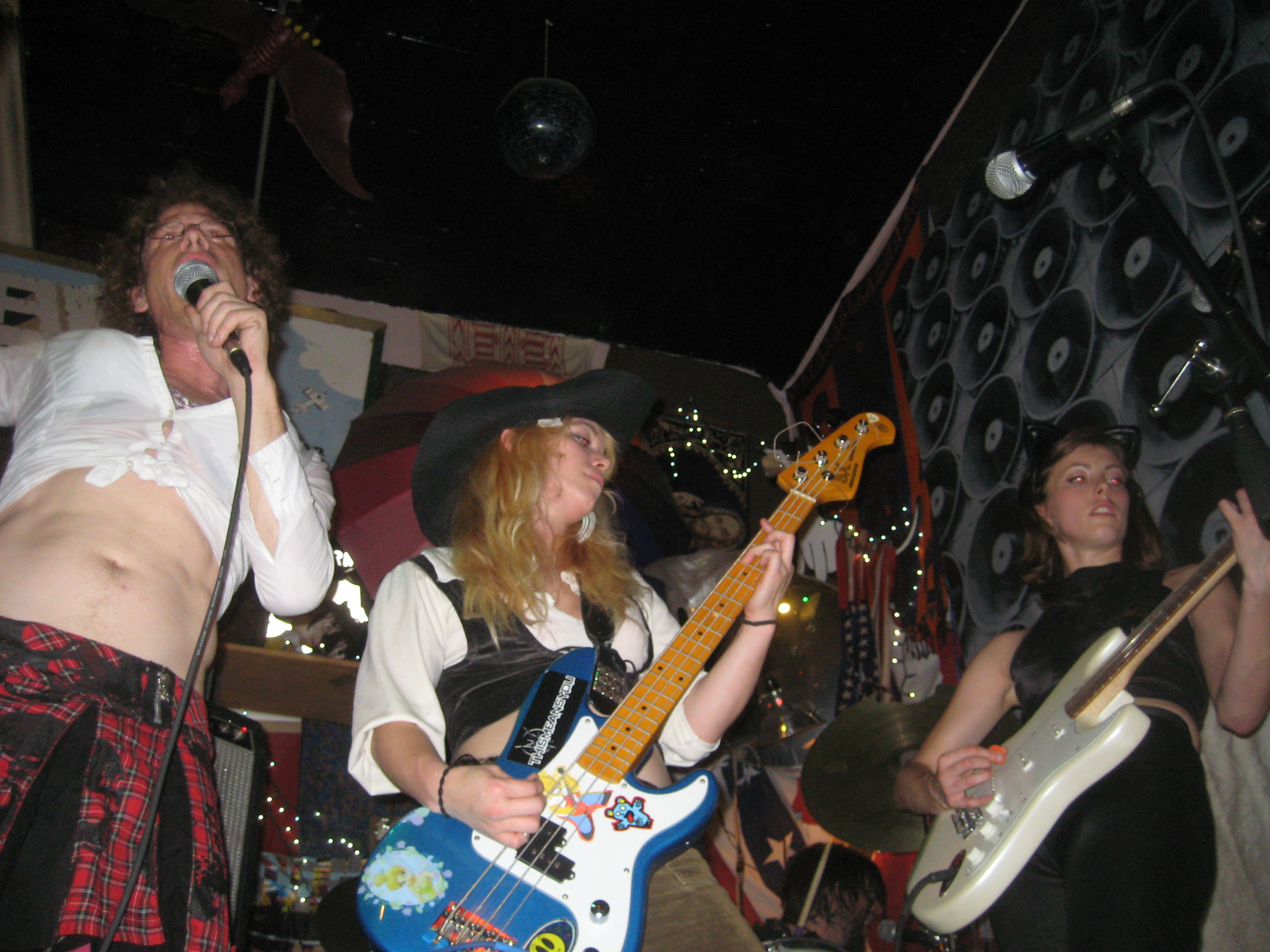
Peter Markush, Morgan Moran, and Carter Lewis performing in 2008 in Bushwick, Brooklyn. Lance Brenner can be seen in the back

Present

- Lance Brenner - lead and backing vocals, drums, percussion, rhythm guitar, keyboards, harmonica (2005–present)
- Carter Lewis - lead and rhythm guitar, bass, backing and lead vocals (2007–present)
- Hunter Bruton - bass, keytar, keyboards, lead and rhythm guitar, harmonica, backing and lead vocals (2022–present)
- Francisco Davilla - drums, percussion, bass, backing and lead vocals (2024–present)
- Ayla Olivari - percussion, bass, violin, rhythm guitar, backing and lead vocals (2025-present)

Past members

- Peter Markush - lead and backing vocals, keyboards, bass, rhythm guitar, harmonica, trumpet (2005–2010)
- Josh Davis - lead guitar, backing and lead vocals (2005–2007)
- Jessi Giannini - bass, keyboards, backing and lead vocals (2005–2006)
- Morgan Moran - bass, drums, rhythm guitar, trumpet, keyboards, backing and lead vocals (2006–2022; live guest appearance 2022)
- Kyle Woolard - lead and backing vocals, bass, rhythm guitar, keyboards (2010–2013)
- Corrina Hanson - drums, percussion, rhythm guitar, saxophone, bass, keyboards, backing and lead vocals (2018-2022, 2024; live guest appearance 2022)
- Katie Hanson - trombone, bass, keyboards, harmonica, backing and lead vocals (2018–2022; live guest appearance 2022)
- Sophia Mendicino - lead and rhythm guitar, backing and lead vocals (2018–2023)
- Seth Johnston - drums, percussion, bass, backing and lead vocals (2022-2024; live guest appearances 2018–2020)

== Works ==
- The Real Fake Things, EP, 2006
- We're More Rock n Roll Than You!, EP, 2008 including "Are you Sexually Available?"
- Eat Me: The Musical, feature film, 2009
- Cock Rock Block Party, concert film, 2012
- IT'S TRUE!, EP, 2020

== Related projects ==
In 2006, the Falsies staged a performance of the musical Hedwig and the Angry Inch.

Brenner of the Falsies was an organizer of C-Fest, which was a Charlottesville-based music festival. Brenner also has been an organizer of other local bands to help them record music and promote themselves.
