= Hanna Risku =

Finnish professor

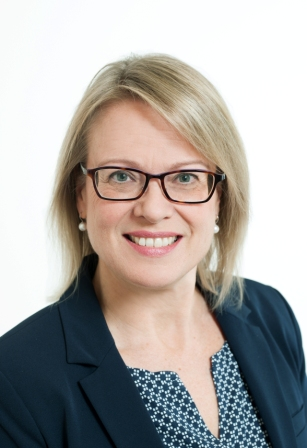
- Born: 27 April 1967 (age 59); Mikkeli, Finland

Academic background
- Thesis: Translatorische Kompetenz: Kognitive Grundlagen des Übersetzens als Expertentätigkeit (1996)

Academic work
- Discipline: Linguist
- Institutions: University of Vienna

Hanna Risku (born 1967) is a Finnish linguist, who since 2017 has worked as professor of translation studies at the University of Vienna.

Prior to that, she worked from 2011 to 2017 as professor and head of the Institute for Theoretical and Applied Translation Studies at the University of Graz, and as professor and vice-rector at the University for Continuing Education Krems.

In 2016, Risku was elected member of the Finnish Academy of Science and Letters.

Risku obtained a master's degree (1992) in German and English translations from the University of Tampere, and a doctorate (1996) from the University of Vienna with her thesis titled Translatorische Kompetenz: Kognitive Grundlagen des Übersetzens als Expertentätigkeit (lit. 'Translatorial Competence: Cognitive Foundations of Translating as Expert Activity).

In addition to her native Finnish, Risku is fluent in German, English and Swedish, and has basic knowledge of French and Estonian.
