= 7th Grade Girl Fight =

American indie rock band

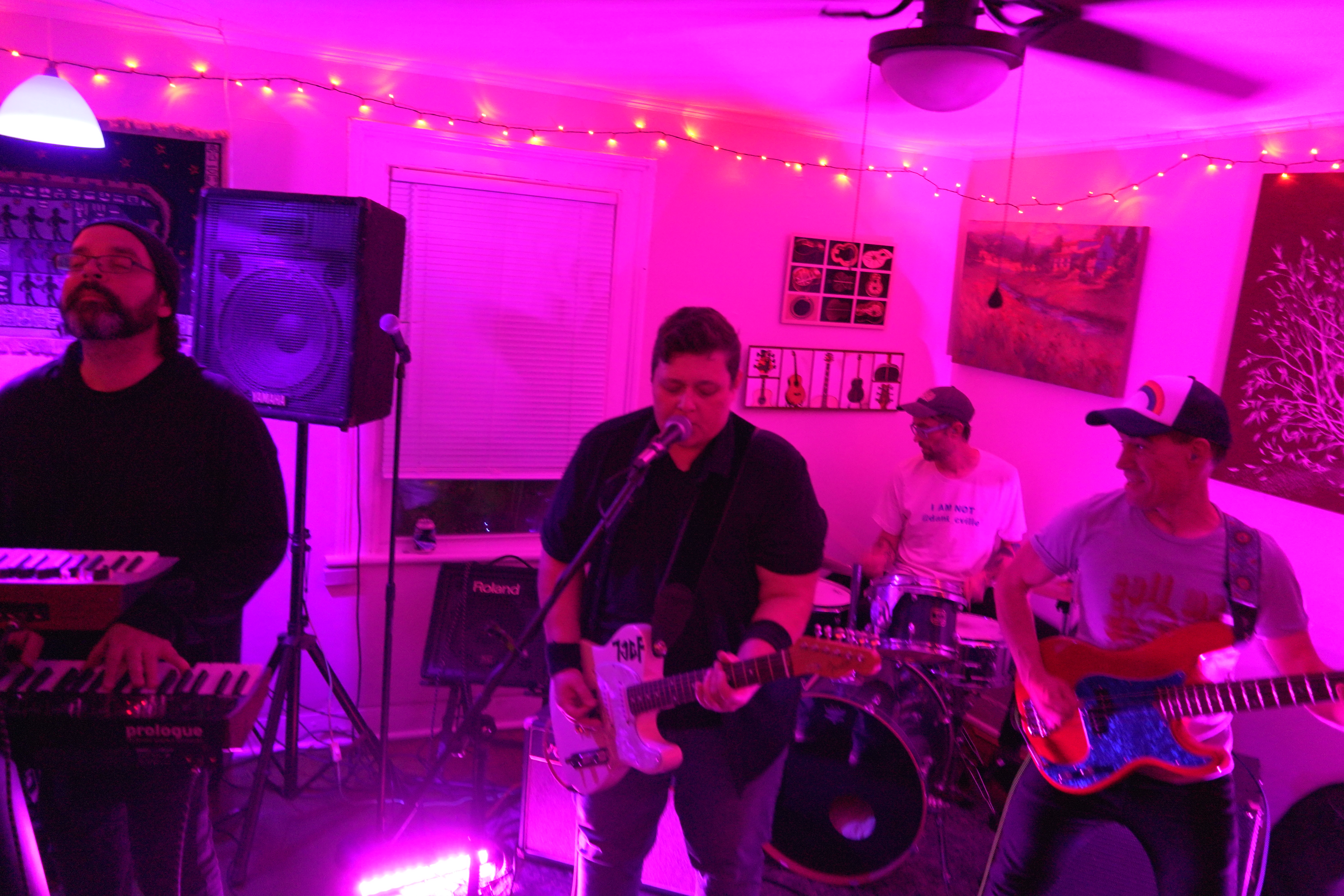
- 7th Grade Girl Fight

Background information
- Origin: Charlottesville, Virginia
- Genres: Indie rock, pop-punk
- Website: 7thgradegirlfight.com

7th Grade Girl Fight is a rock music group based in Charlottesville, Virginia.

Lead vocalist Debra Guy established the band in early 2018.

In 2021 the band released its self-titled debut album which contained songs they had recorded and performed in the past few years. They had begun compiling the album in 2020 during the COVID pandemic.

== Band members ==
- Debra Guy - Vocals, Guitar
- Drew Pompano - Bass
- JJ Williams - Keys
- Brian Wiltz - Drums

== Discography ==
Studio albums

- 7th Grade Girl Fight (2021)

EPs

- Jump Back (2019)
- Summer Is Over (2018)
- Someone Will Be With You Shortly (2023)

Singles

- In Between (2020)
- Demands (2020)
- D3C3MB3R (2024)
- We Don't Raise Our Voices In This House (2025)
- Sea Captain (2026)
