= Don Kiraly =

American linguist

Prof. Donald C. Kiraly (born November 3, 1953, in Charlottesville, Virginia), is an American linguist who specializes in foreign language teaching and translator training.

== Biography ==
Kiraly studied political science at the Cleveland State University and obtained a bachelor of arts degree in June 1976, followed by a master of arts degree in international relations at Florida State University, which he completed in August 1977. Afterwards, from September 1977 until June 1980, he worked as an English teacher at the National Institute of Applied Sciences in Lyon (France) and from September 1981 to July 1982 at the Lawton School in Gijón (Spain). Between June 1980 and June 1981, he earned a master of arts degree in the teaching of French at the University of Illinois. From January 1983 to June 1983, he worked as an English teacher at the International Chamber of Commerce in Roanne, France.

Since January 1985, Kiraly has been employed as a researcher and lecturer at the School of Translation, Linguistics and Cultural Studies of the University of Mainz in Germersheim, Germany. From 1984 to 2008, Kiraly also worked as a freelance translator in the specialised fields of business and economics, viticulture, tourism, and public administration.

In January 1990, he received a Ph.D. degree with his dissertation entitled "Toward a Systematic Approach to Translation Skills Instruction" from the University of Illinois. From August to November 1999, he was a visiting professor at the Monterey Institute of International Studies in Monterey (California), and, from September 2008 to August 2012, he held a visiting professor's position at the École Supérieure d'Interprètes et Traducteurs of the University of Paris III, where he taught French-English, Spanish-English and German-English translation, among other subjects. Since 1990, Kiraly has published a number of articles, two monographs, a co-authored book and two edited volumes in the areas of foreign language teaching and translator training.

In 2017, Kiraly was named Professor without Chair (außerplanmässiger Professor) by the University of Mainz on the basis of his research and teaching record.

== Awards ==
In the winter semester 2012/2013, Kiraly was awarded the Teaching Award of the Johannes Gutenberg University Mainz.

== Selected publications ==
- 'Translation into a Non-mother Tongue: From Collaboration to Competence', In Grosman, M., Kovacic, I. Snell-Hornby, M. (Eds.) Translation into Non-mother Tongues - In Professional Practice and Training. Tübingen: Stauffenburg Verlag, 117–123. 2000.
- 'From Teacher-Centered to Learning-Centered Classrooms in Translator Education.' Across Languages and Cultures 1 (2), (239-244). 2000.
- 'Summary of Discussion: Collaboration, Teamwork and Groupwork', (Innovation in Translator and Interpreter Training. Report on an On-Line Symposium). Across Languages and Cultures 1 (2), (263-269). 2000.
- 'From Instruction to Collaborative Construction: a Passing Fad or the Promise of a Paradigm Shift in Translator Education?', in Arango-Keith, F., Baer, B., Bell, S., Koby, G. (Eds). Beyond the Ivory Tower: Rethinking Translation Pedagogy, Kent, Ohio: Kent State University Press, 3–32. 2000.
- 'Eine Reise auf verschlungenen Pfaden hin zu einer Didaktik des Übersetzens', in Pöckl, W. (Ed.), Übersetzungswissenschaft Dolmetschwissenschaft: Wege in eine neue Disziplin. Vienna: Edition Prasens. 169-178. 2004.
- 'Preparing students today to meet market demands tomorrow', in Forstner M. & Lee-Jahnke, Hannelore (Ed.) Marktorientierte Translationsausbildung, Frankfurt: Peter Lang. 101-118. 2004.
- 'Situating Praxis in Translator Education', in Krisztina Karoly & Ágota Fóris (eds.) New Trends in Translation Studies–Festschrift für Kinga Klaudy. Budapest: Akademiai Kiado. 117-138.2005.
- "Project-Based Learning: A Case for Situated Translation," META (50,4), (1098-1111).2005.
- 'Beyond Social Constructivism: Complexity Theory and Translator Education', Translation and Interpreting Studies. (6,1) 68-86. 2006.
- 'Sprachmittlung in einer komplexen Welt: Die Übersetzerausbildung im Wandel', in Quo vadis Translatologie? Ein halbes Jahrhundert universitäre Ausbildung von Dolmetschern und Übersetzern in Leipzig. Rückschau, Zwischenbilanz und Perspektiven aus der Außensicht. Wotjak, Gerd (Ed.) Berlin: Frank und Timme. 191-204. 2006.
- 'Transcultural relating: An example of project-oriented translator education', Studia Universitatis Babeş-Bolyai – Philologia. (3/2008), (5-10). 2008.
- 'Acknowledging Learning as Enaction: Moving Beyond Social Constructivism Towards Empowerment in Translator Education', in Laplace, Colette, Marianne Lederer, Daniel Gile (Ed.), La Traduction et Ses Métiers. Cahiers Champollion No. 12, Caen: Lettres Modernes Minard. 179-191. 2009.
- 'Emergence in the language classroom: An experiment in facilitated language acquisition', in Hannelore Lee-Jahnke and Erich Prunç (Eds.), Am Schnittpunkt von Philologie und Translationswissenschaft, Festschrift zu Ehren von Martin Forstner. Bern: Peter Lang. 109-119. 2010.
- 'Growing a Project-Based Translation Pedagogy: A Fractal Perspective,' Meta 57(1). pp. 82–95. 2012.
- 'Skopos Theory Goes to Paris: Purposeful Translation and Emergent Translator Competence'. Risku, Hanna/Christina Schäffner/Jürgen Schopp (eds.): Special Issue of mTm to Commemorate Hans J. Vermeer (mTm – A translation Journal). Athens: Diavlos. pp. 119–144. 2012.
- Das Kultivieren einer Translationsdidaktik – Eine fraktale Perspektive,' in Hansen-Schirra, Silvia and Don Kiraly (eds.) Projekte und Projektionen in der translatorischen Kompetenzentwicklung. Frankfurt: Peter Lang. 11-32. 2013.
- 'Towards A View of Translator Competence as an Emergent Phenomenon: Thinking Outside the Box(es) in Translator Education,' in Kiraly, Don / Hansen-Schirra, Silvia & Maksymski, Karin (eds.) New Prospects and Perspectives for Educating Language Mediators. Translationswissenschaft, Band 10. 197-224. 2013.
- 'Förderung autopoietischer Fremdsprachenbildung – von der holistischen Sprachbegegnung zur autonomen Aneignung von fortgeschrittenen fremdsprachlichen Fertigkeiten,' in Gutenberg Lehrkolleg der Johannes Gutenberg-Universität Mainz (eds.) Gute Lehre – von der Idee zur Realität. Innovative Lehrprojekte an der JGU. Bielefeld: Universitätsverlag Webler. 121-134. 2013.
- Kiraly, Don; Graham, Anne-Marie. 'European Graduate Placement Scheme – an education partnership developing global translation graduates,' in Proceedings of the Future of Education Conference. June 2013.
- Kiraly, Don; Piotrowska, Maja. 'Curriculum Development Model for the European Graduate Placement Scheme,' in Proceedings of the 4th Future of Education Conference, Florence, Italy. June 2014.
- 'From Assumptions about Knowing and Learning to Praxis in Translator Education' in: Piotrowska, Maria, Tyupa, Sergiy (eds.) inTRAlinea Special Issue: Challenges in Translation Pedagogy. 2014.
- 'Language Acquisition in the Classroom: from Tasks to Enaction' in: Krings, Hans. P, Kuehn, Bärbel (eds.) Fremdsprachliche Lernprozesse: Erträge des 4. Bremer Symposions zum autonomen Fremdsprachenlernen. Bochum: AKS Verlag. 2015.
- 'Occasioning Translator Competence: Moving Beyond Social Constructivism Towards A Postmodern Alternative to Instructionism,' in Translation and Interpreting Studies 10:1, 8–32. 2015.
- 'Authentic Project Work and Pedagogical Epistemologies: A Question of Competing or Complementary Worldviews?,' in Towards Authentic Experiential Learning in Translator Education. V&R Press, 53–66. 2015.
- Kiraly, Don; Hofmann, Sascha. 'Towards a Post-positivist Curriculum Development Model for Translator Education,' in Towards Authentic Experiential Learning in Translator Education. V&R Press, 67–88. 2015.
- Kiraly, Don; Rüth, Lisa, Wiedmann, Marcus. 'Enhancing Translation Course Design and Didactic Interventions with E-Learning, ' in Towards Authentic Experiential Learning in Translator Education. V&R Press, 175–198. 2015.
- 'Beyond the Static Competence Impasse in Translator Education,' in Thelen, Marcel; van Egdom, Gys-Walt;Verbeeck, Dirk;Bogucki, Lukasz; Lewandowska-Tomaszczyk (eds). Translation and Meaning New Series Vol 1. Frankfurt: Peter Lang. 129-142. 2016.
