= The Hook (newspaper) =

Defunct newspaper in Charlottesville, Virginia

- February 22, 2007, edition
- Type: Alternative weekly
- Format: Tabloid
- Founder: Hawes Spencer
- Publisher: Better Publications LLC
- Founded: February 7, 2002
- Ceased publication: September 26, 2013
- City: Charlottesville, Virginia
- Free online archives: readthehook.net/archives

The Hook was a weekly newspaper published in Charlottesville, Virginia, and distributed throughout Central Virginia and the Shenandoah Valley. It was founded in 2002 by a number of former employees of another Charlottesville weekly, C-ville Weekly, including its co-founder and editor Hawes Spencer. The Hook went out of business in 2013.

== History ==
In 2007, 2009, and again in 2013, The Hook won the Virginia Press Association Award for Journalistic Integrity and Community Service, the VPA's highest honor.

The Hook features included the "HotSeat" (in which Charlottesville notables answered questions about everything from what is in their refrigerator to their most embarrassing moments), "4BetterOrWorse" (an often humorous summary of local and national news items), and the "Culture Calendar". The Hook's webcam showed the streetscape of Charlottesville's Downtown Mall, a pedestrian promenade that includes the local Ice Park and Jefferson and Paramount theaters.

In addition to print, The Hook branched out into other media in 2006 with the launch of its blog and weekly podcast.

== Archives ==
In June 2022, its 22,000 stories were removed from the internet. The Washington Post subsequently reported speculation that the deletion of the archives may have been a catch and kill operation. Following journalism about the removal of the articles, a "mysterious benefactor named F" presented an archive and committed to keep the content available. The "website appears to be complete, including links to all issues of The Hook, but the site's internal search engine appears to be disabled." A new archive website was created by former Hook reporter Dave McNair using links preserved by the Internet Archive.
