= Wendy Repass =

American singer-songwriter

- Born: Wendy Repass
- Origin: Charlottesville, VA, United States
- Genres: Folk rock
- Occupation: Singer-songwriter
- Instrument(s): Vocals, acoustic guitar
- Years active: 1990–present
- Labels: Motherstone

Wendy Repass is an American folk singer-songwriter located in Charlottesville, Virginia.

== Artists worked with ==
Eddie from Ohio, Anton Chenko, producer of Suzanne Vega's "Solitude Standing", Daemon recording artist Kristen Hall, The Marshall Tucker Band, Indigo Girls, and Matthew Sweet, Dave Matthews Band, former US Poet Laureate Rita Dove, John McCutcheon, producer Kevin McNoldy, drummer Stuart Gunter of Clare Quilty, bass by Andy Waldeck of Earth to Andy and violin by former National Symphony Orchestra member Ann Marie Simpson.

== Discography ==
1. Chapter 1: The Coming of Age (1995)
2. Motherstone (2005)

== Awards ==
"Chapter 1: The Coming of Age" voted the Best Independent CD of 1995 by Music Monthly.
