= Hawes Spencer =

American journalist

Hawes Spencer is the founder and editor of The Hook, the weekly newspaper in Charlottesville, Virginia and the Shenandoah Valley. He is also a founder of Charlottesville's other alternative newsweekly C-ville Weekly and owned and operated Charlottesville's Jefferson Theater from 1992 to 2006.

== Career ==
Spencer covered Charlottesville news for 23 years. He founded The Hook on February 7, 2002, with Bill Chapman and Rob Jiranek. Here he worked as the editor-in-chief. He is the author of Summer of Hate, a book about the violence surrounding the Unite the Right rally, the white nationalist rally in Charlottesville in August 2017.

== Sources and external links ==
- The Hook
- The Jefferson Theater
- Cavalier Daily article on first weeks of the Hook
- Summer of Hate: Charlottesville, USA
