= Burley High School (Charlottesville, Virginia) =

Former segregated school in Virginia, US

Coordinates: 38.0398°N 78.4865°W

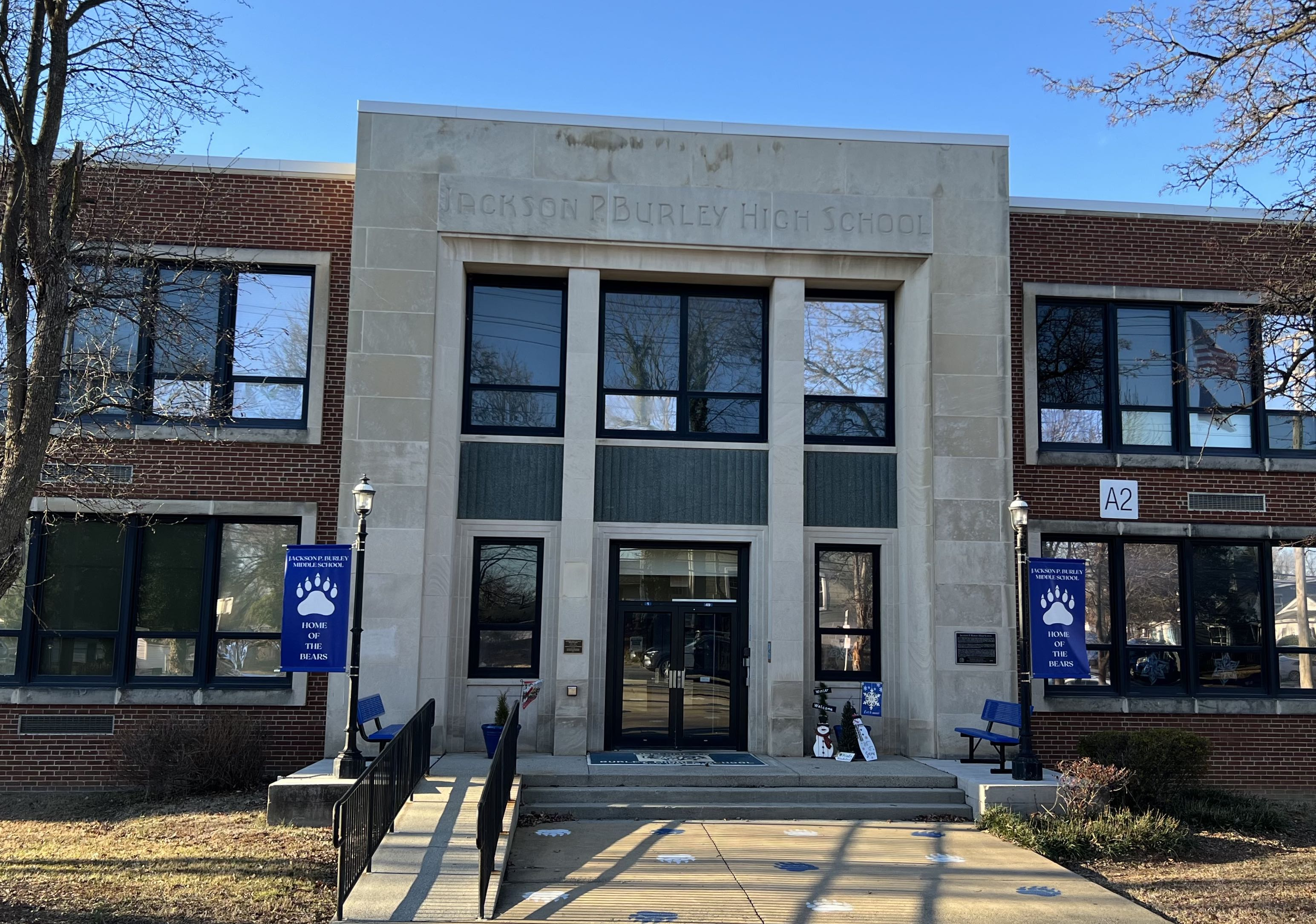
Burley High School

Jackson P. Burley High School was a segregated school for African American students in Charlottesville, Virginia. Located on Rose Hill Drive, it opened in 1951 to serve students from both the City of Charlottesville and Albemarle County. It graduated its final class of seniors in 1967, and soon after, the city's interest in the school was purchased by Albemarle County. In 1974 it reopened as Jackson P. Burley Middle School.

The school was built on a seventeen-acre tract of land purchased from a prominent African American community member, Jackson P. Burley. In November, 2020, the school was listed on the National Register of Historic Places.

== Curriculum ==
A 1965 yearbook shows an all-black faculty, designated in the following fields: English, Social Studies, French, Mathematics, Science, Biology, Chemistry, Physics, Music, Art, Home Economics, Vocational Education, Practical Nursing, Business Education, Mechanical Drawing, and Physical Education.

=== Practical nursing training course ===
The Jackson P. Burley High School and the University of Virginia created a training course in practical nursing in 1951. In 1957, the program consisted of two years of training. The first year was offered at the high school and included courses on 1. body structure; 2. group living; 3. community health; 4. feeding the family; 5. meeting emergency needs; 6. care of the newborn, mother; 7. children and the aged nursing; 8. nursing principles and skills; and 9. personal and vocational relations and conditions of illnesses. The second year of the program took place at the University of Virginia Hospital. The second year of training consisted of 44-hours of instruction with 4 hours of classroom and 40 hours of clinical teaching focusing on condition of illnesses; personal and vocational relationships, and supervised nursing procedures. The subjects were taught by Mrs. Lucy Johnson, a registered nurse who served as clinical instructor of practicing nursing at the University of Virginia from the inception of this program. Applicants to the program had to be senior high school students, at least 16 years of age and of good moral character. In addition, applicants were required to demonstrate evidence of good physical, mental, and dental health care. Adults with two years of high school were also eligible for enrollment with the same requirements for good health and moral character.

== Student life ==
The school yearbook was titled the Jay Pee Bee. The student paper was the Burley Bulletin and the school literary magazine was the Quill and Scroll. The school song was "Ode to Burley" written by Mildred Jones. "Our Hearts Were Young and Gay" by Cornelia Otis Skinner was the first three act play presented by a senior class in 1954.

The Student Council of Burley was founded in September 1951 with the goal of giving students a voice in the administration of the school. The council was made up of one representative from each homeroom with a president and vice-president elected by the student body. All other officers were elected by the council itself.

The senior trip for the class of 1957 was to Baltimore, MD and Washington DC on May 17, 1957.

The auditorium had a seating capacity of 900 and hosted community functions as well as school activities.

== Band life ==
In 1953, the Burley High School band was officially organized as a club. Mr. Elmer Sampson was band director of the Burley band during the years 1956 - 1959. The band was supported by a "Band Sponsors' Group" consisting of community members interested in supplying many of the needs of the band.

In 1957, the Burley Band participated in the Apple Blossom Festival Parade, in Winchester, VA.

== Athletics ==
The school's mascot was the Burley Bears and the school colors were kelly green and old gold. Sports programs for boys included football, track, and basketball. The football program began under the leadership of coach Robert Smith, who had previously coached multiple sports at Jefferson High School. Under Smith, the football team "compiled a 41-12-5 record, won five district championships and won 28 consecutive games from 1955-58. His 1956 team not only won the VIA state title, but did not allow a point the entire year."

== Segregation and massive resistance ==
Burley High School students were important actors in the fight over school integration in Charlottesville following the 1954 decision of Brown v. Board of Education. In 1958, the NAACP filed a lawsuit on behalf of Burley students who sought the opportunity to transfer to all-white Lane High School. This resulted in the city joining the massive resistance strategy that was being used throughout the Commonwealth. Despite students being admitted to attend Lane High School as early as 1962, some students chose to attend Burley instead, such as football player Garwin DeBerry, who would not have been allowed to play the sport at Lane High School due to his race.
