= 2011 Super Outbreak =

Largest tornado outbreak in recorded history

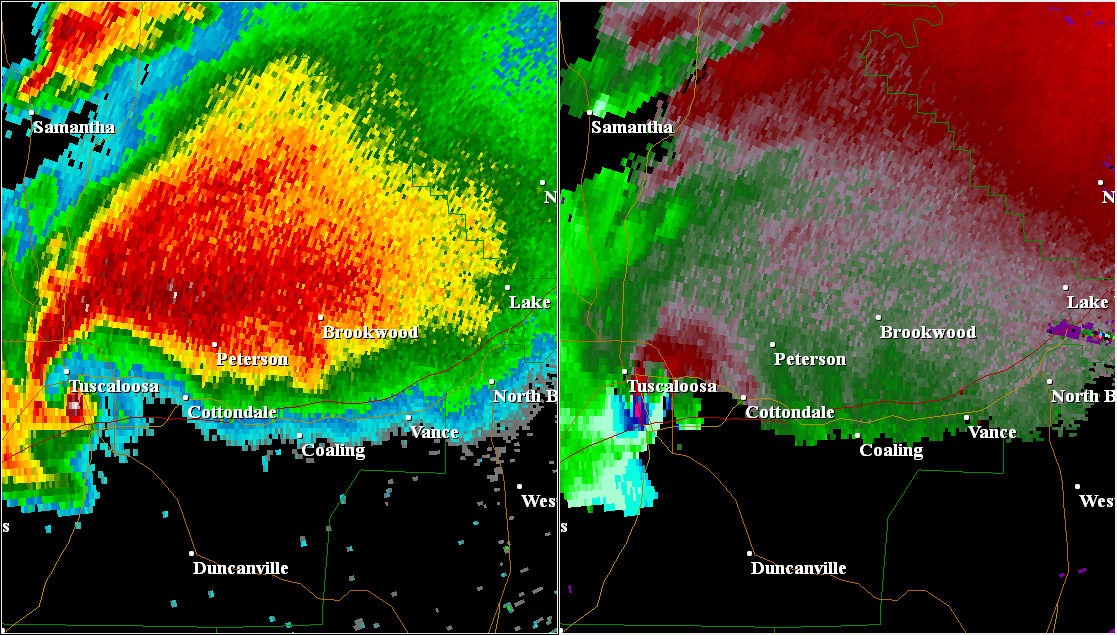
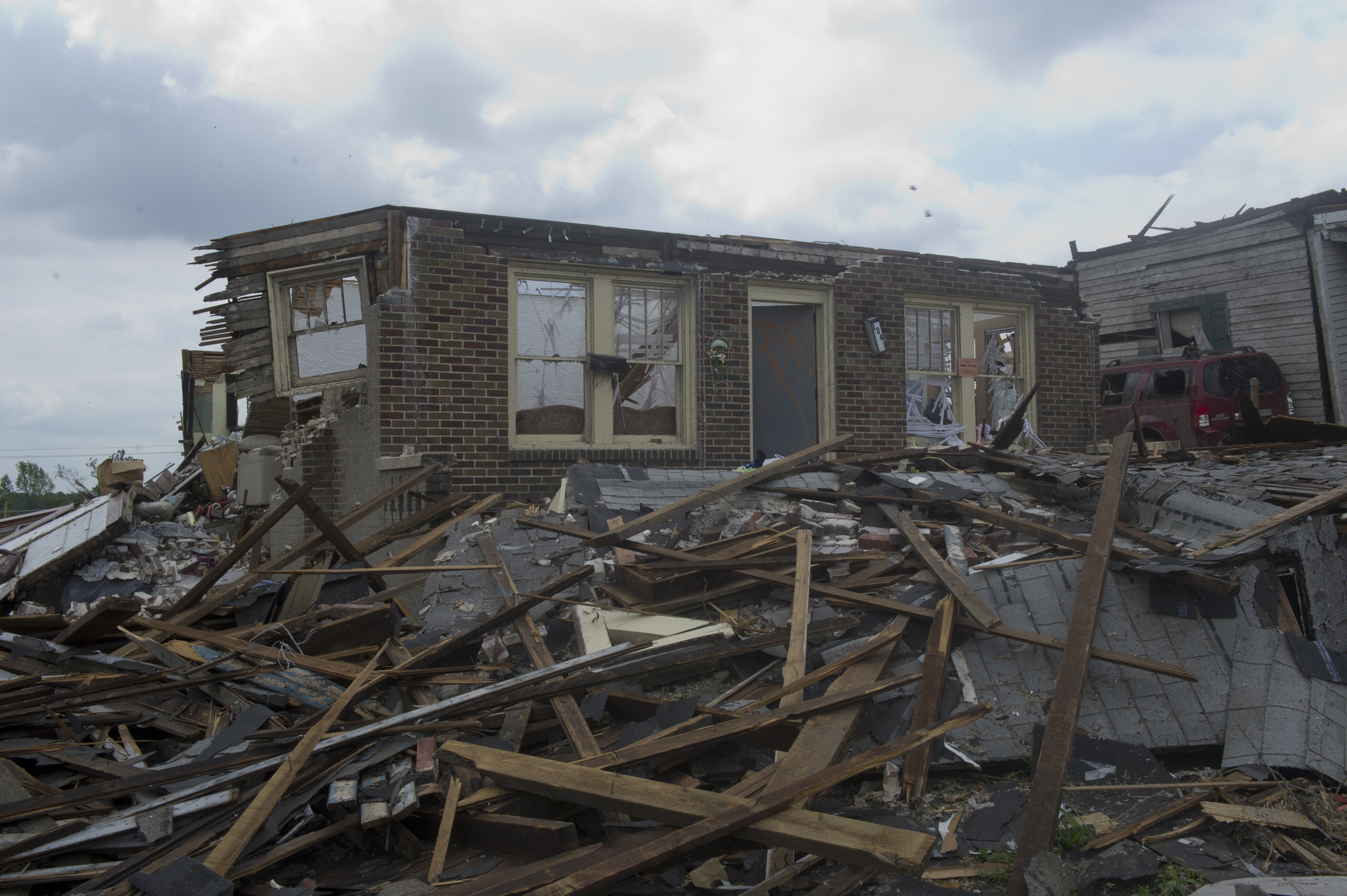
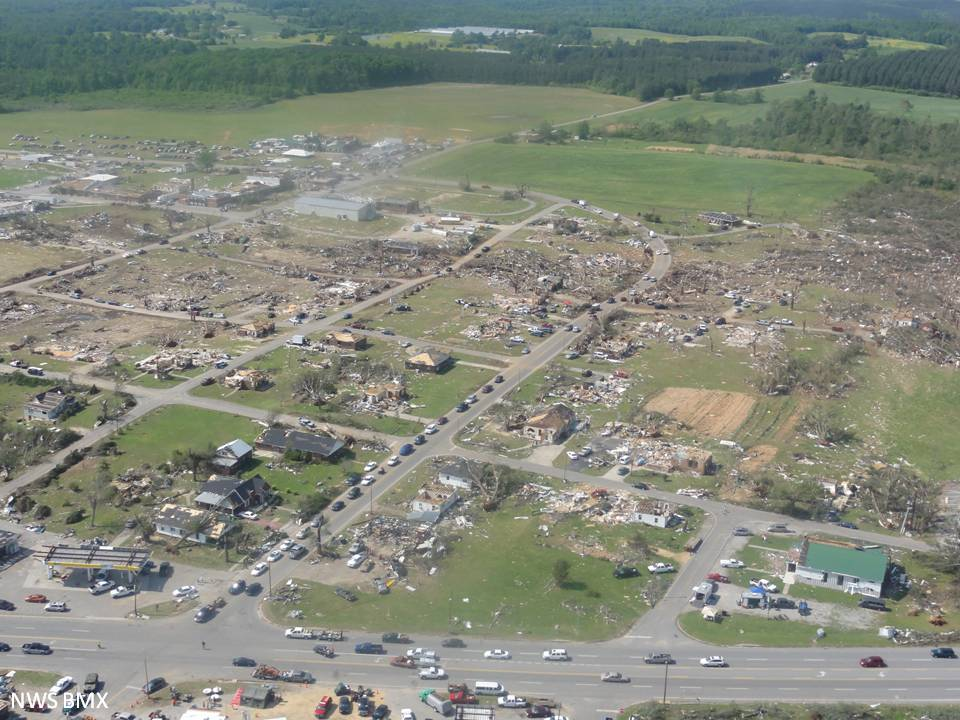
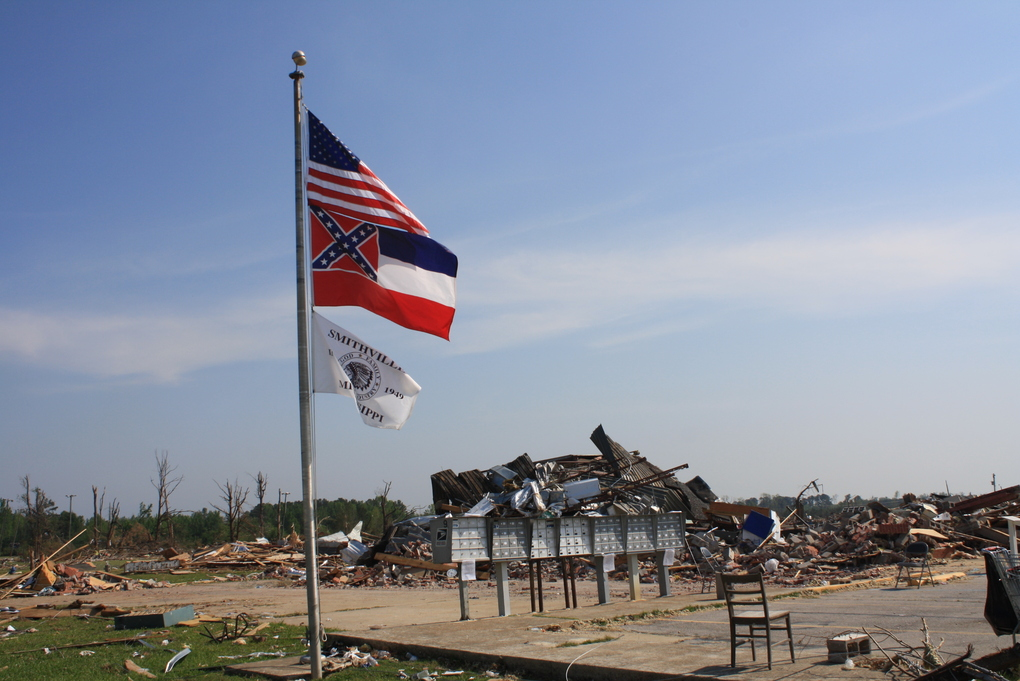
- Clockwise from top: The storm system responsible for the outbreak on April 27, heavy damage to buildings in Tuscaloosa, Alabama after an EF4 tornado, flags raised above a post office in Smithville, Mississippi after an EF5 tornado hit the town, an aerial view of EF5-rated tornado damage in Hackleburg, Alabama after a violent tornado moved through the town, a visible hook echo that would produce a violent tornado in Tuscaloosa

Meteorological history
- Duration: April 25–28, 2011

Tornado outbreak
- Tornadoes: 368 confirmed (Record for a continuous outbreak)
- Max. rating: EF5 tornado
- Duration: 3 days, 7 hours, 18 minutes
- Highest winds: Tornadic – 210 mph (340 km/h) (Hackleburg–Phil Campbell, AL EF5 on April 27)
- Highest gusts: Non-tornadic – 113 mph (182 km/h) (near Bay, AR on April 27)
- Largest hail: 4.5 in (11 cm) in Saltville, Virginia on April 27

Extratropical cyclone
- Lowest pressure: 990 hPa (mbar); 29.23 inHg
- Max. rainfall: 19.26 in (48.9 cm) in Springdale, Arkansas
- Max. snowfall: 6 inches (15 cm) in Bayfield County, Wisconsin

Overall effects
- Fatalities: 324 (+24 non-tornadic)
- Injuries: 3,100+
- Damage: $10.2 billion (2011 USD) $14.6 billion (2025 USD) (Second-costliest tornado outbreak on record; costliest on record when accounting for inflation)
- Areas affected: Southern, Midwestern, & Eastern United States
- Part of the tornado outbreaks of 2011

The 2011 Super Outbreak was the largest and costliest (Note: When adjusted for inflation. The tornado outbreak of March 13–16, 2025 caused $11 billion in damages, however the 2011 Super Outbreak remains the costliest when adjusted.) tornado outbreak ever recorded, taking place in the Southern, Midwestern, and Northeastern United States from April 25 to 28, 2011, leaving catastrophic destruction in its wake. Over 175 tornadoes struck Alabama, Mississippi, and Tennessee, which were the most severely damaged states. Other destructive tornadoes occurred in Arkansas, Georgia, Kentucky, Louisiana, New York, and Virginia, with storms also affecting other states in the Southern and Eastern United States. In total, 368 tornadoes were confirmed by NOAA's National Weather Service (NWS) and Government of Canada's Environment Canada in 21 states from Texas to New York to southern Canada. Widespread and destructive tornadoes occurred on each day of the outbreak. April 27 was the most active day, with a record 224 tornadoes touching down that day from midnight to midnight CDT (05:00–05:00 UTC). Four of the tornadoes were rated EF5, which is the highest ranking on the Enhanced Fujita scale; typically these tornadoes are recorded no more than once a year, and may not be recorded for several consecutive years.

In total, 348 people were killed as a result of the outbreak, including 324 tornado-related deaths across six states and 24 fatalities caused by other thunderstorm-related events such as straight-line winds, hail, flash flooding or lightning. In Alabama alone, 238 tornado-related deaths were confirmed by the Storm Prediction Center (SPC) and the state's Emergency Management Agency. April 27's 316 fatalities were the most tornado-related fatalities in the United States in a single day since the "Tri-State" outbreak on March 18, 1925 (when at least 751 people were killed). Nearly 500 preliminary local storm reports were received for tornadoes over four days, including 292 in 16 states on April 27 alone. This event was the costliest tornado outbreak in United States history, with total damage reaching $10.2 billion (equivalent to $15 billion in 2025). In 2023, tornado expert Thomas P. Grazulis created the outbreak intensity score (OIS) as a way to rank various tornado outbreaks. The 2011 Super Outbreak received an OIS of 383, making it the second most intense tornado outbreak in recorded history behind only the 1974 Super Outbreak.

== Meteorological synopsis ==
=== Setup during April 25–27 ===
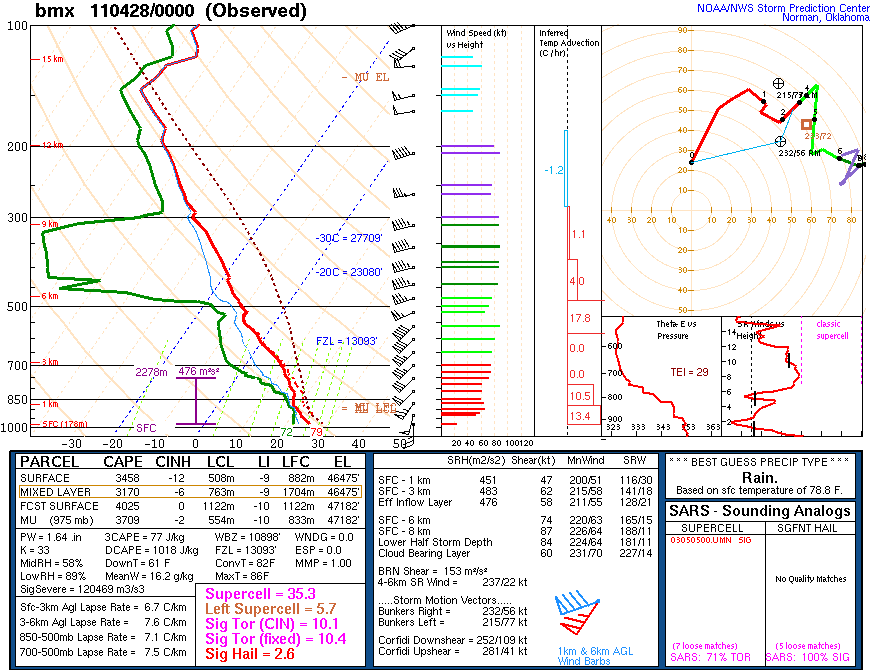
The 0000z atmospheric sounding, taken from Birmingham, Alabama on April 27

The outbreak was caused by a vigorous upper-level trough that moved into the Southern Plains states on April 25. An extratropical cyclone developed ahead of this upper-level trough between northeastern Oklahoma and western Missouri, and moved northeastward. Conditions were similar on April 26, with a predicted likelihood of severe thunderstorms, including an extended threat of strong to violent long-track tornadoes throughout the afternoon and evening; mixed-layer CAPE values were forecast to be around 3000–4000 J/kg, around east Texas, Louisiana, and Arkansas. The storm mode on April 26 was predicted to include mostly discrete tornadic supercells during both the afternoon and the early evening, shifting over to a mesoscale convective complex, with more of a threat of damaging winds and hail during the nighttime.

Storm Prediction Center outlooks on April 27, 2011

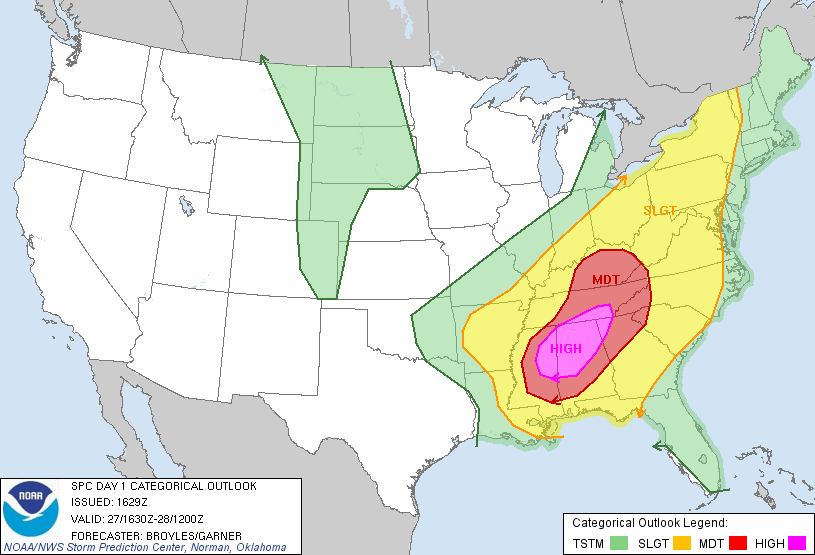
SPC Outlook shows a High Risk of Severe Weather within the southern U.S

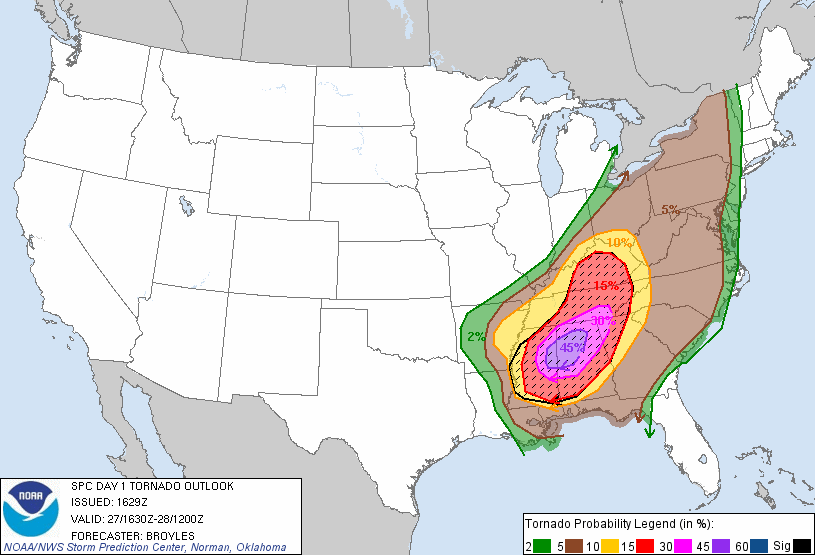
SPC Outlook at 16:30 UTC showing a 45% chance for tornadoes in the southern U.S

As the storm system moved eastward toward the Ohio, Mississippi, and Tennessee Valleys on April 27, a very powerful 80–100 knot mid-level jet stream moved into the Ohio and Tennessee Valleys behind the trough and created strong wind shear, along with a low pressure center moving quickly northeastward across those areas on April 27. During the afternoon of April 27, CAPE values were estimated to be in the range of 2000–3000 J/kg across Louisiana and southern Mississippi, with the moderate instability moving northeastward across the southern Tennessee Valley; additionally, temperatures across the southeastern United States ranged from the 70s °F (mid-20s °C) to the lower 90s °F (near 35 °C). Helicity levels ranged from 450 to 600 m^{2}/s^{2}, which supported some significant tornadic activity and strong to violent long-track tornadoes. At 06:10 UTC, the SPC issued a second-consecutive, high risk day-one outlook, featuring a 30% hatched risk of tornadoes centered over northern Alabama. At 16:30 UTC (11:30 AM CDT) this region was expanded to include portions of eastern Mississippi, southern Tennessee, and northwest Georgia. Additionally, a rare, 45% hatched risk of tornadoes was introduced along a corridor from Meridian, Mississippi, to Huntsville, Alabama.

=== Overview ===
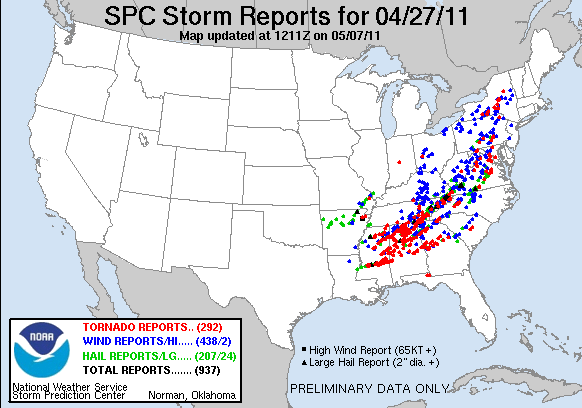
SPC Storm Reports for April 27

A total of 56 severe weather watches were issued by the Storm Prediction Center (SPC) over those four days in the outbreak area. This included 41 tornado watches—10 of which were particularly dangerous situation (PDS) watches—and 15 severe thunderstorm watches. The SPC assigns numbers to each severe weather watch issued starting at the beginning of each year; the organization accidentally skipped over two of their allocated watch numbers during this outbreak (numbers 208 and 209). The Storm Prediction Center received 292 reports of tornadoes in the preceding 24 hours. In addition to setting the record for most tornadoes in a calendar day (223; midnight to midnight CDT (05:00 – 05:00 UTC)), it also broke the record for the most tornado touchdowns in any 24-hour period with 226 from 12:40 a.m. to 12:40 a.m. CDT (05:40 – 05:40 UTC) April 27–28, breaking the old 24-hour record of 148 set by the 1974 Super Outbreak. Of those 226 tornadoes, 59 touched down in Alabama and 83 began in Tennessee, accounting for 62.8 percent of the tornadoes that touched down on April 27. On April 27 alone, the National Weather Service in Huntsville, Alabama, issued 92 tornado warnings, 31 severe thunderstorm warnings, and seven flash flood warnings. The National Weather Service in Birmingham, Alabama issued 49 tornado warnings, and 24 severe thunderstorm warnings. In total, 449 tornado warnings were issued on April 27

== Confirmed tornadoes ==
Daily statistics during the 2011 Super Outbreak
| Date (Note: All dates are based on the local time zone where the tornado touched down; however, all times are in Coordinated Universal Time and dates are split at midnight CST/CDT for consistency.) | Total | EF-scale rating | | | | | | Deaths | Injuries |
| Date | Total | EF0 | EF1 | EF2 | EF3 | EF4 | EF5 | Deaths | Injuries |
|---|---|---|---|---|---|---|---|---|---|
| April 25 | 42 | 17 | 20 | 4 | 1 | 0 | 0 | 5 | 59 |
| April 26 | 55 | 31 | 19 | 4 | 1 | 0 | 0 | 0 | 4 |
| April 27 | 224 | 72* | 81 | 36 | 20 | 11 | 4 | 316 | 2,986+ |
| April 28 | 47 | 18 | 23 | 5 | 1 | 0 | 0 | 3 | 51 |
| Total | 368 | EF0 138* | EF1 143 | EF2 49 | EF3 23 | EF4 11 | EF5 4 | 324 | 3,100+ |

* One tornado touched down in Ontario, Canada on April 27 and was rated as an F0. It is counted as an EF0 in this table.

- Map of the damage tracks of tornadoes that occurred during the 2011 Super Outbreak. (Interactive map, click or tap to view in detail); View mapdata (all), View mapdata (EF3+) Key EF0 65–85 mph (105–137 km/h); EF1 86–110 mph (138–177 km/h); EF2 111–135 mph (179–217 km/h); EF3 136–165 mph (219–266 km/h); EF4 166–200 mph (267–322 km/h); EF5 ≥201 mph (323 km/h)

A record 368 tornadoes touched down over the span of four days, 37 of which were EF3+ tornadoes. Four tornadoes were rated EF5 – behind only the 1974 Super Outbreak (7 F5s). Several of the strong to violent tornadoes that formed were exceptionally long-tracked, with six tornadoes on April 27 tracking over 60 miles (97 km). Many tornadoes on the afternoon of April 27 were spawned from a collection of supercells that moved across Mississippi, Alabama, Tennessee, and Georgia.

The period from 2:28 p.m. CDT (1928 UTC) to 9:10 p.m. CDT (0210 UTC) represented nearly seven hours of continuous tornado activity during the height of the outbreak of April 27, during which 94 tornadoes touched down. All fifteen violent EF4+ tornadoes occurred continuously during this time, beginning with the Philadelphia, Mississippi EF5 tornado at 2:30 p.m. CDT (1930 UTC) and concluding with the dissipation of the Lake Martin, Alabama EF4 tornado at 9:09 p.m. CDT (0209 UTC). Several tornadoes from the outbreak were exceptionally long-tracked. Three tornadoes on April 27 travelled over 100 miles (160 km), with a fourth traversing 97 miles (156 km). Seven tornadoes–the Vilonia tornado on April 25 and six tornadoes on April 27–stayed on the ground for over an hour. The long-track Mississippi-Alabama EF4 was down from 2 hours, 53 minutes, the longest duration for a tornado in the outbreak.

=== Ferndale–Vilonia, Arkansas ===
Ferndale–Vilonia, Arkansas
- The tornado, seen near Vilonia

Meteorological history
- Formed: April 25, 2011, 6:48 p.m. CDT (UTC−05:00)
- Dissipated: April 25, 2011, 7:59 p.m. CDT (UTC–05:00)
- Duration: 1 hour, 11 minutes

EF2 tornado
- on the Enhanced Fujita scale
- Highest winds: 130 mph (210 km/h)

Overall effects
- Casualties: 4 fatalities, 16 injuries

The first tornado of the outbreak to cause more than one death was this long-tracked, extremely large, and destructive high-end EF2 wedge tornado that struck the small town of Vilonia in Faulkner County, Arkansas, around 7:30 p.m. CDT (00:30 UTC) on April 25. A tornado warning was issued for the area roughly 30 minutes prior to the tornado's arrival, and the relatively low loss of life was attributed to this lead time. A tornado emergency was declared at 7:24 p.m. CDT (00:24 UTC) for the city shortly before the tornado struck. Four people were killed in the town and many more were injured. The tornado touched down northwest of Ferndale in Pulaski County at 6:48 p.m. CDT (23:48 UTC), downing trees and transmission towers at EF1 intensity. It continued northeast of Natural Steps, severely damaging a small church and downing numerous trees, one of which landed on a house. The tornado continued to knock down trees as it passed near Roland, several of which landed on homes. The tornado reached EF2 strength as it crossed into Faulkner County and passed southeast of Mayflower, downing numerous trees and power lines and damaging homes and outbuildings. Past Mayflower, it continued towards Vilonia and struck a mobile home park, where numerous mobile homes were destroyed and the four fatalities occurred. Two of the fatalities occurred when a couple attempted to take shelter in a cargo container, which was thrown 150 yards (140 m) and deposited near a pond. Several other people were injured in this area as well. The tornado maintained EF2 intensity as it moved directly through Vilonia, damaging numerous homes and businesses and flipping several semi-trucks. The American Red Cross indicated that approximately 34 site-built houses and 62 mobile homes were destroyed, 91 site-built homes and 41 mobile homes suffered major damage, 145 site-built houses and 43 mobile homes had minor damage, and 53 site-built houses and 38 mobile homes were affected in some other way in the Vilonia area. One of the mobile homes was picked up and flipped, and the home's two bathtubs were found over a hill about 40 yards (37 m) away. The lone occupant of the mobile home sustained major injuries. After moving through Vilonia, the tornado weakened to EF1 strength as it moved into White County and passed west of El Paso, where trees were blown over onto houses (damaging several roofs), barns and outbuildings were destroyed, an RV and the trailer portion of a tractor-trailer were overturned, and hundreds of trees were downed. The tornado finally dissipated north of Joy at 7:59 p.m. CDT (00:59 UTC), after having travelled just over 51 miles (82 km). At its widest point, the tornado was 1.64 miles (2.64 km) wide. Following the tornado, 85 members of the U.S. National Guard were deployed to assist in search and rescue, debris clearing, security and traffic control.

On April 27, 2014, three years and two days after this tornado, a violent EF4 tornado touched down west of Ferndale and moved along almost the same path as this tornado, causing 16 fatalities and many injuries. However, it affected more of Mayflower than this tornado did and caused greater damage all along the path, especially in Vilonia, before lifting near El Paso.

=== Philadelphia–Kemper County, Mississippi ===
Philadelphia–Kemper County, Mississippi
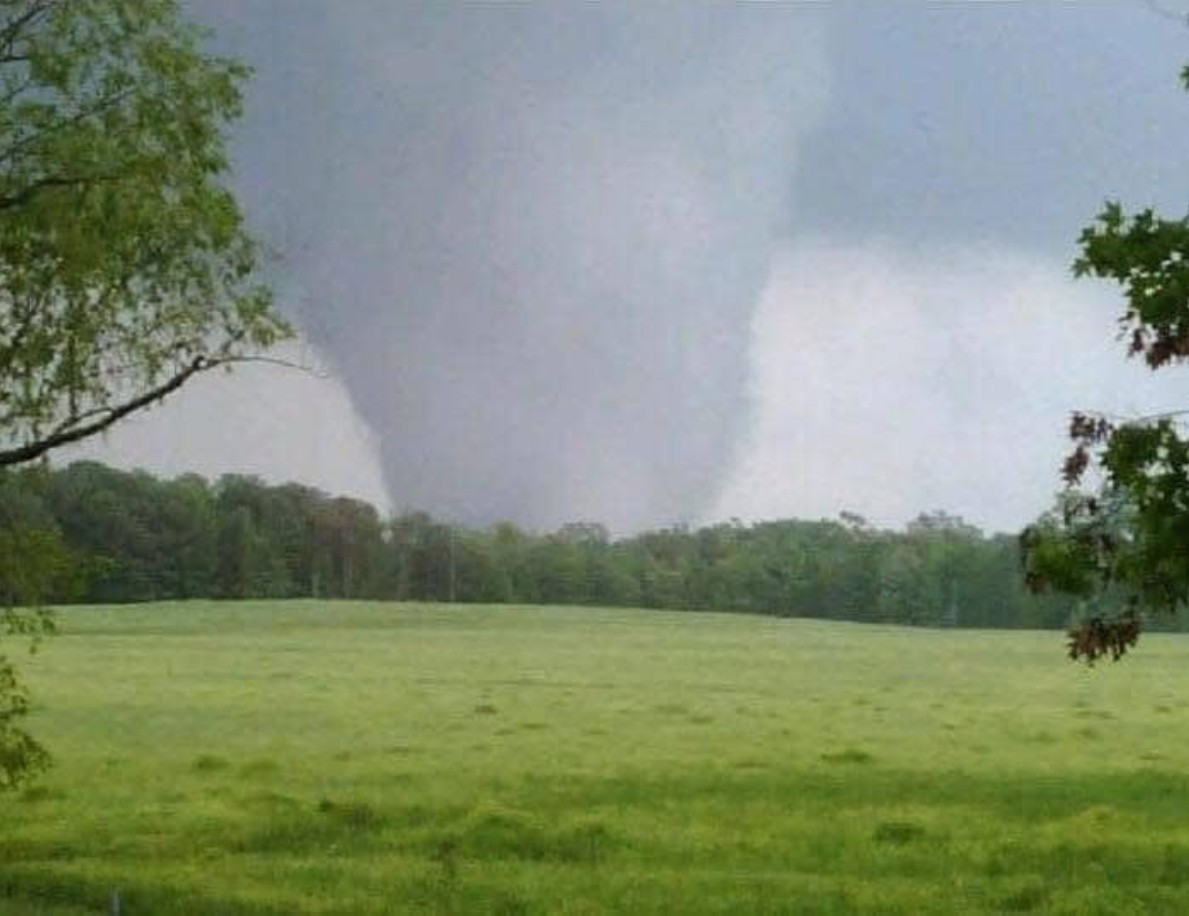
- The tornado seen northeast of Philadelphia

Meteorological history
- Formed: April 27, 2011, 2:30 p.m. CDT (UTC−05:00)
- Dissipated: April 27, 2011, 3:00 p.m. CDT (UTC−05:00)
- Duration: 30 minutes

EF5 tornado
- on the Enhanced Fujita scale
- Highest winds: 205 mph (330 km/h)

Overall effects
- Casualties: 3 fatalities, 8 injuries

This violent, fast moving and destructive tornado, which became the first EF5 tornado of the outbreak, touched down near the city of Philadelphia, Mississippi, on April 27. The tornado touched down at 2:30 p.m. CDT (19:30 UTC) and traveled for nearly 29 miles (47 km) through Neshoba, Kemper, Winston, and Noxubee Counties, reaching a maximum width of a 1/2-mile (0.80 km). The tornado killed three people, injured eight others, and caused $1.1 million in damage across its path.

The supercell thunderstorm that produced this tornado formed around 1:00 p.m. CDT south of Jackson, Mississippi. Traveling briskly to the northeast, it warranted a severe thunderstorm warning within 25 minutes and was deemed potentially tornadic by 1:36 p.m. CDT. A tornado finally touched down at 2:30 p.m. CDT just east of the Philadelphia Municipal Airport. It quickly intensified and began producing EF5 damage by 2:38 p.m. CDT; extreme ground scouring, up to 1.6 feet (0.49 m) deep in places, occurred in northeastern Neshoba County. After crossing into Kemper County, the tornado obliterated a mobile home, killing all three inside. It reached EF5 strength a second time near the Kemper–Winston county line where extreme ground scouring again took place and pavement was scoured. Extreme tree damage took place along the track and it ultimately dissipated at 3:00 p.m. CDT about 6 miles (9.7 km) north of Mashulaville.

This was the first tornado to cause F5/EF5 damage in Mississippi since the Candlestick Park tornado on March 3, 1966. Additionally, the tornado was the first to be rated EF5 since 2008.

=== Cullman–Arab, Alabama ===
Cullman–Arab, Alabama
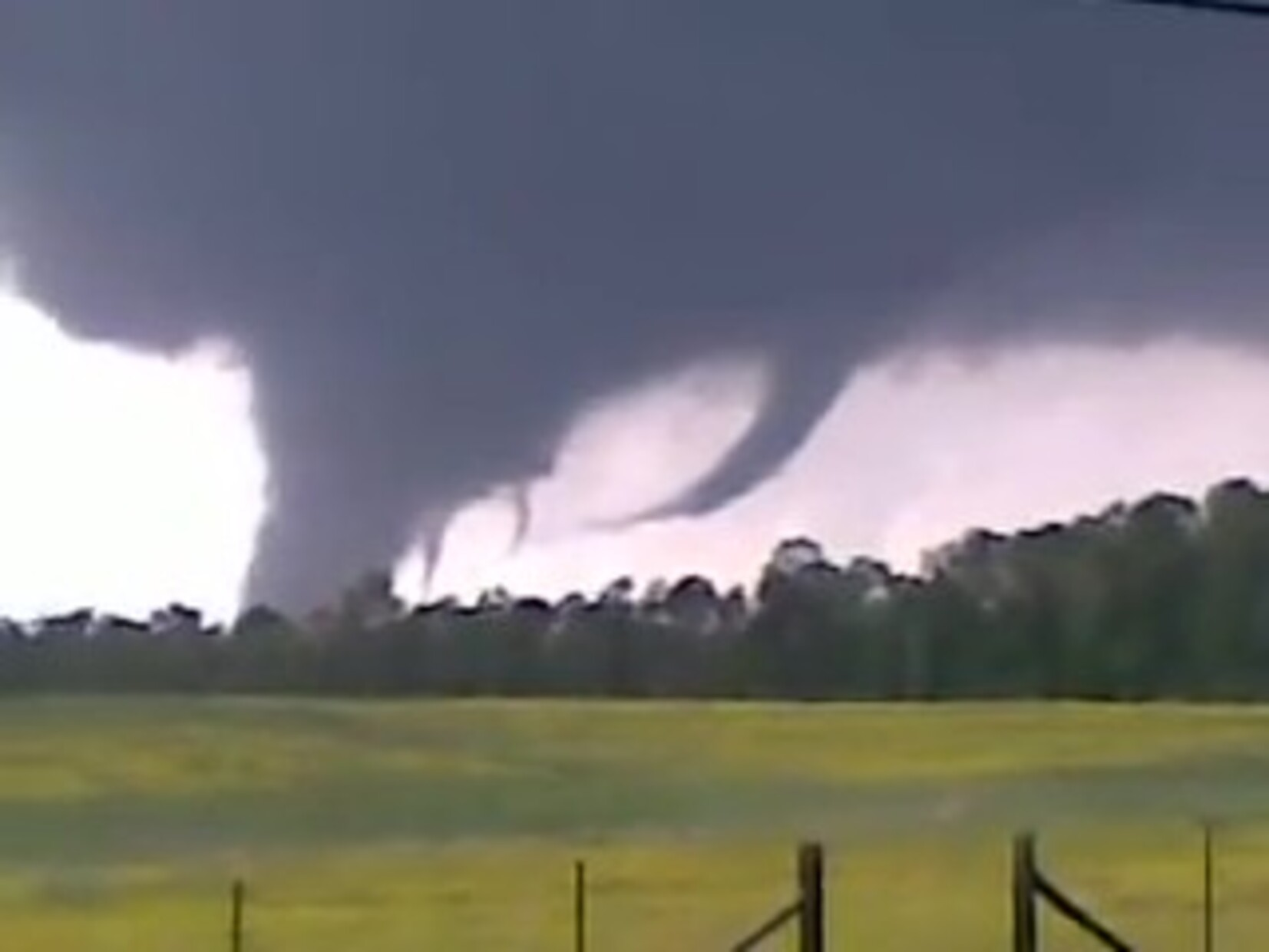
- The tornado producing a large horizontal vortex as it approached Cullman.

Meteorological history
- Formed: April 27, 2011, 2:40 p.m. CDT (UTC−05:00)
- Dissipated: April 27, 2011, 3:38 p.m. CDT (UTC−05:00)
- Duration: 58 minutes

EF4 tornado
- on the Enhanced Fujita scale
- Highest winds: 190 mph (310 km/h)

Overall effects
- Casualties: 6 fatalities, 48+ injuries

Rated as a high-end EF4, this highly visible multiple-vortex tornado tracked directly through downtown Cullman. The tornado touched down at 2:40 p.m. CDT (19:40 UTC) on April 27 and tracked a 47-mile (76 km) damage path through Cullman, Morgan, and Marshall Counties, causing six deaths. The Cullman tornado first touched down on the north side of Lewis Smith Lake and caused light structural damage near Crane Hill before intensifying and tracking directly towards Cullman, snapping numerous trees and heavily damaging several homes. The tornado entered Cullman while being tracked and broadcast live via several tower cameras, including those operated by Birmingham Fox affiliate WBRC (channel 6) and ABC affiliate WBMA-LD/WCFT-TV/WJSU-TV (channels 58, 33, and 40 - "ABC 33/40"), for several minutes. In all, a total of 867 residences and 94 businesses within the city of Cullman were damaged or destroyed.

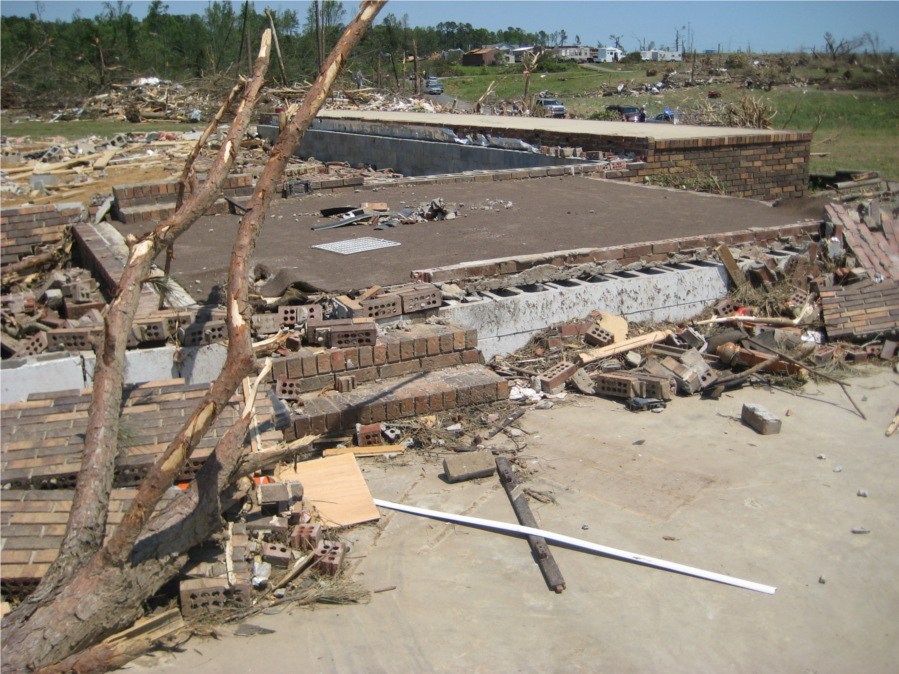
High-end EF4 damage to a home northwest of Arab, where five fatalities occurred.

The tornado then passed just north of Fairview at EF4 intensity, completely destroying homes and debarking numerous hardwood trees. Pieces of debris were found speared through vehicles in this area. In Ruth, just north of Arab, a large but poorly anchored brick home was swept completely away in this area, with the debris scattered 100 yards (91 m) from the foundation. Arab's power grid was completely crippled by the tornado's effects, and many roads in the area were obstructed by downed trees and power lines. The tornado damaged and destroyed several other homes, garages, and sheds north of Union Grove before it crossed the Tennessee River just downstream of Guntersville Dam. It snapped numerous trees in a forested area before dissipating southeast of New Hope.

Widespread power outages occurred in the immediate aftermath of the tornado, which were largely centered in Cullman County. Almost 200 power poles in and around Cullman were leveled, and 4,000 volunteers from the Tennessee Valley Authority helped to restore power, although some residents were still without power a week after the tornado. The State of Alabama gave $5,989,728 (2011 USD) to the City of Cullman to aid with recovery efforts, and a further $1,294,892 (2011 USD) to Cullman County. A plan was also set in place by the University of Alabama to help fund recovery efforts. Six people were killed by the tornado; five in Ruth and one in rural Cullman County. The five deaths in Ruth occurred when the tornado directly impacted a well-constructed home at EF4 intensity, leveling the building and killing all of the residents of the home; all were in the same family. The sixth death as a result of the tornado took place in Cullman County, in the tornado's early stages. Storm chaser Dan Whittaker, who was observing the tornado as it moved through Cullman near him, stated that "this is not like any tornado I've seen anywhere."

=== Anchor–Okolona–New Wren, Mississippi ===
Anchor–Okolona–New Wren, Mississippi
- The tornado as seen near New Wren, Mississippi.

Meteorological history
- Formed: April 27, 2011, 2:48 p.m. CDT (UTC-05:00)
- Dissipated: April 27, 2011, 3:38 p.m. CDT (UTC-05:00)
- Duration: 50 minutes

EF3 tornado
- on the Enhanced Fujita scale
- Highest winds: 150 mph (240 km/h)

Overall effects
- Casualties: 4 fatalities, 25 injuries

This intense and long tracked EF3 tornado tore a 37.75 mile (60 km) path across northeast Mississippi, resulting in over $2.27 million in property damage (2011 USD), as well as 4 fatalities and 25 injuries.

The tornado first touched down at 2:48 p.m. CDT (7:48 UTC) in Webster County just southeast of the town of Slate Springs, quickly uprooting multiple trees before crossing into Calhoun County. One home sustained major damage, and a barn was destroyed. The tornado would then move into Chickasaw County, where a nearly fully constructed home would have its roof completely torn away. The tornado continued northeast, and rapidly entered and hit the community of Anchor. In Anchor, one death would occur, and several homes would end up completely destroyed by the tornado. Two mobile homes adjacent to each other on County Road 98 were both completely destroyed, with one of them being thrown into uprooted and snapped trees. The tornado would then track south of the city of Houston, where an additional two deaths would occur, and another seventy-four homes would end up completely destroyed, and another ninety-two home sustained major damage. Multiple homes near The Sonora Community would also sustain major damage, with one single-story home reduced to only one interior wall. Numerous mobile homes would also end up completely destroyed by the tornado. Numerous trees and power lines were also knocked down in the area.

A radar image of the tornado south of Houston

The tornado would enter mainly wooded areas within Natchez Trace Parkway, where many trees were snapped, uprooted or debarked, with the worst of the damage being noted between mileposts 204 and 212 The tornado continued its track, and entered Monroe County, and quickly began to approach the town of Okolona. Numerous homes in the town of Okolona were completely destroyed, with some potentially being completely swept away in the neighborhood of Chapel Grove. A truck driver in Okolona was killed when his truck was picked up and carried for 1.7 miles (2.7 km) from Highway 45 and dropped behind a home in the Daren community.

The tornado would then continue into the communities of New Wren and Wren, where many more homes would sustain major damage, and numerous trees would end up debarked. The tornado would dissipate around 3:38 p.m. CDT (8:38 UTC).

=== Hackleburg–Phil Campbell–Tanner–Harvest, Alabama ===
Hackleburg–Phil Campbell–Tanner–Harvest, Alabama
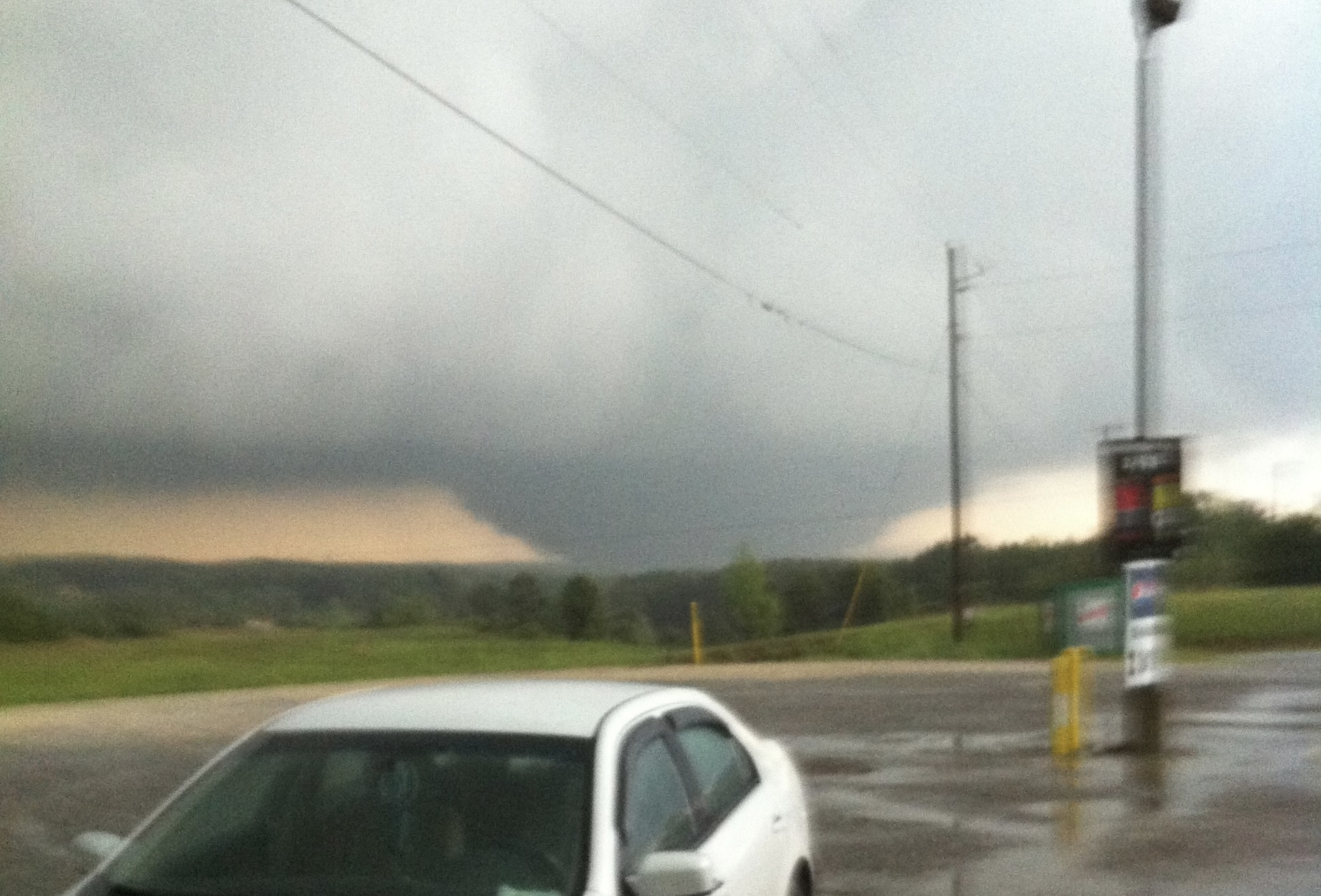
- Photo of the tornado shortly after exiting Phil Campbell

Meteorological history
- Formed: April 27, 2011, 3:05 p.m. CDT (UTC−05:00)
- Dissipated: April 27, 2011, 4:50 p.m. CDT (UTC−05:00)
- Duration: 1 hour, 45 minutes

EF5 tornado
- on the Enhanced Fujita scale
- Highest winds: 210 mph (340 km/h)

Overall effects
- Casualties: 71 fatalities, 145+ injuries

This devastating, long-tracked and violent EF5 wedge tornado was the deadliest of the outbreak. It first touched down in Marion County, Alabama, about 5 miles (8.0 km) west-southwest of Hamilton around 3:00 p.m. CDT (21:00 UTC) on April 27, leaving massive damage along its track. The storm would eventually reach the Hackleburg area, completely leveling many homes and businesses, including a large Wrangler, Inc. factory. Most of the structures in downtown Hackleburg were badly damaged and Hackleburg High School was destroyed. Well-built homes were wiped cleanly from their foundations, extensive wind-rowing of debris occurred, trees were completely debarked, and cars were thrown hundreds of yards. According to the American Red Cross, 75 percent of the town was destroyed. While initially rated as an EF3, the rating was increased to EF5 after further analysis of the damage, making it the first F5/EF5 tornado in Alabama since the Birmingham tornado of April 8, 1998.

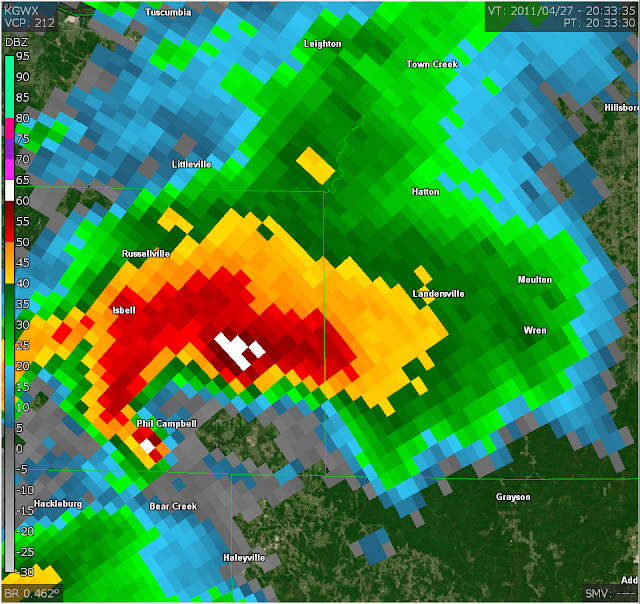
Radar image of the tornado as it neared the town of Phil Campbell, Alabama, with a debris ball evident

Soon after crossing into Franklin County, the town of Phil Campbell experienced significant devastation of the same magnitude as Hackleburg. Numerous homes, some of which were well-constructed, were swept away as the tornado tore through town. At least three churches along the path sustained significant damage, with one church in the town being completely destroyed and having only the foundation slab remaining. Mobile homes throughout the path were completely destroyed, and their mangled frames were tossed at least 25 to 50 yards (23 to 46 m). Cars were tossed and destroyed throughout the path of the tornado, with one car wrapped around a debarked tree. A 25-foot (7.6 m) section of pavement was torn from a road in this area as well. The most intense damage along the path occurred northeast of Phil Campbell in the rural community of Oak Grove, where vehicles were carried long distances and mangled beyond recognition, large trees were completely debarked, and large brick homes with extensive anchoring were obliterated with the debris wind-rowed hundreds of yards away. The tornado continued into Lawrence County, impacting the Mount Hope community, where significant devastation was incurred to single-family homes and a restaurant. Nothing but the foundation and a pile of debris remained at the restaurant site, and a small portion of the restaurant's foundation slab buckled.

The tornado moved northeast, producing EF3 damage in and around Langtown. The tornado re-intensified to EF4 strength as it passed near Moulton and Trinity, debarking trees, mangling, and leveling homes. It then continued through the northwest corner of Morgan County, crossed Wheeler Lake, and moved into Limestone County, coming within 2 miles (3.2 km) of Browns Ferry Nuclear Power Plant. The tornado caused power outages in the area, and the plant had to be shut down. The tornado continued towards the small community of Tanner. Tanner experienced a large swath of EF4 damage and a narrow corridor of "high-end EF4 to near-EF5 damage". The storm "completely wiped clean" several well constructed homes with anchor bolting. As the storm crossed US 72 in eastern Limestone County, the tornado destroyed a Doppler radar operated by Huntsville NBC affiliate WAFF (channel 48) and continued into East Limestone, a heavily populated area of Limestone County where homes in subdivisions were damaged or destroyed at high-end EF3 strength.

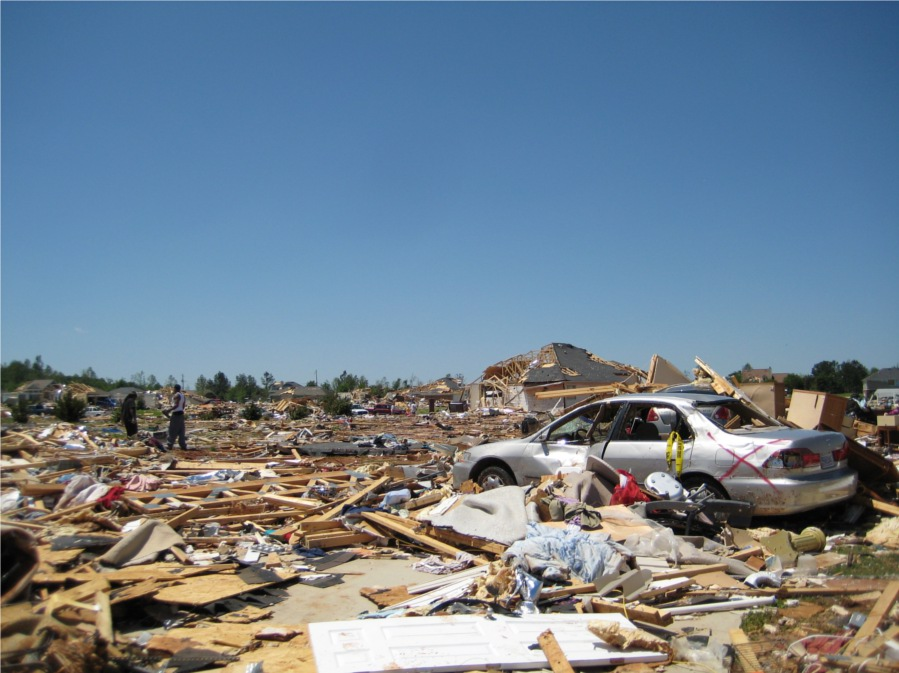
A destroyed neighborhood in Toney, Alabama.

As the storm crossed into Madison County, it approached the densely populated suburban communities of Harvest and Toney, where it either damaged or destroyed hundreds of homes, especially in the Anderson Hills and Carter's Gin subdivisions. Many homes were reduced to rubble, and the damage in this area was rated mainly EF3 with a small pocket of EF4 damage in Harvest. The tornado completely destroyed a Piggly Wiggly grocery store in Harvest and severely damaged a convenience store and local bank, which was shut down for months following the event. The storm progressed across Pulaski Pike in northwest Madison County, damaging many homes, and dissipated soon afterwards. In all, hundreds of homes received moderate to major damage along the path from Limestone to Madison County with many of these being total losses.

Initially, the tornado was thought to have continued into Tennessee. However, updates to the Damage Assessment Toolkit (DAT) and analysis by damage surveyors, including a 2022 re-analysis of the outbreak by the National Oceanic and Atmospheric Administration (NOAA) and National Severe Storms Laboratory (NSSL), determined that the Hackleburg tornado lifted after Madison County and assessed the portion in Tennessee to be a separate EF3 tornado.

In total, this tornado killed 71 people. This made it the deadliest single tornado ever to strike the state of Alabama as well as (at the time) the deadliest in the United States since the 1955 Udall, Kansas, tornado that killed 80 people. In addition to being the deadliest, this tornado also had one of the longest tracks of any tornado in the outbreak, with its path extending 102 miles (164 km) across Northern Alabama.

In response to the damage in Phil Campbell, one of the hardest hit communities, writer Phil Campbell organized a fundraising and relief effort composed of 20 people with the name Phil Campbell or variations thereof. They traveled to the community from places as far away as Australia to aid in the cleanup effort. Many of these people had planned to attend a convention in June 2011 to commemorate the 100th anniversary of the city's incorporation.

=== Reform–Oakman–Cordova–Blountsville, Alabama ===
Reform–Oakman–Cordova–Blountsville, Alabama
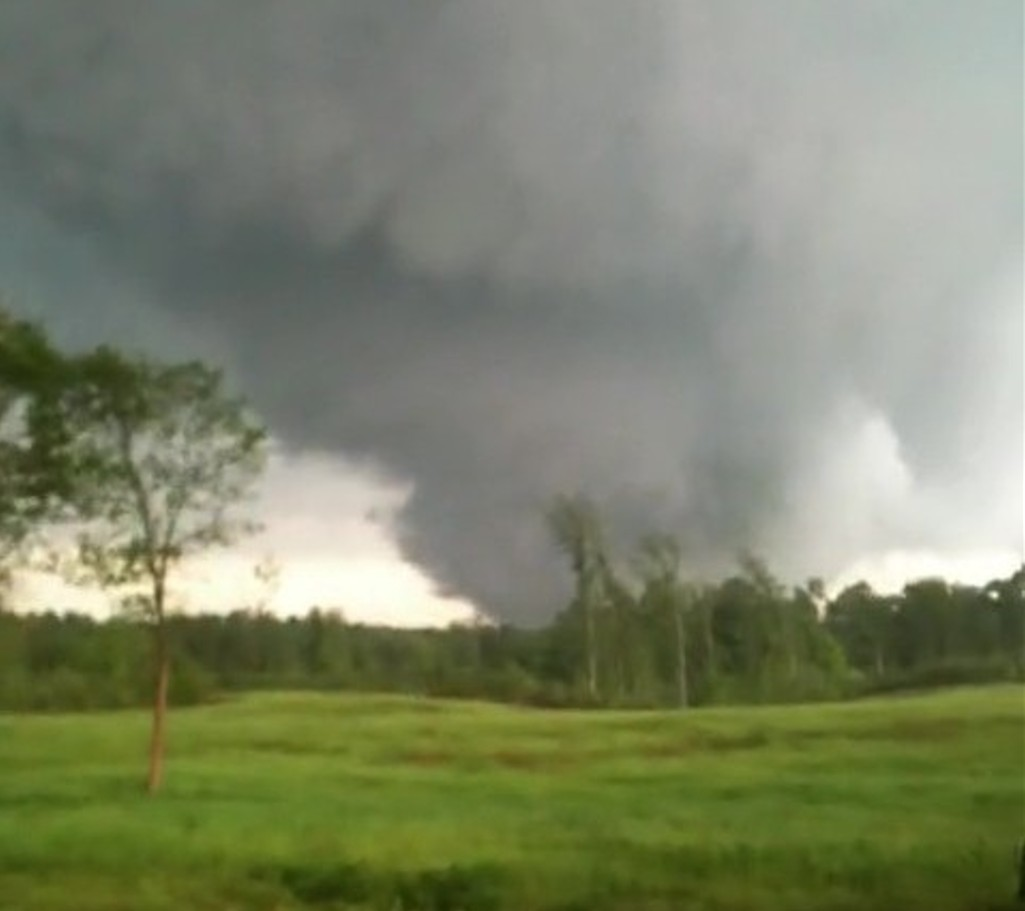
- The tornado at EF4 intensity near Sipsey, Alabama.

Meteorological history
- Formed: April 27, 2011, 3:40 p.m. CDT (UTC−05:00)
- Dissipated: April 27, 2011, 5:56 p.m. CDT (UTC−05:00)
- Duration: 2 hours, 16 minutes

EF4 tornado
- on the Enhanced Fujita scale
- Highest winds: 170 mph (270 km/h)

Overall effects
- Casualties: 13 fatalities, 54+ injuries

This violent and extremely long-tracked EF4 tornado touched down at 3:40 p.m. CDT (20:40 UTC) in northeastern Pickens County, Alabama, where it strengthened while impacting structures at EF0 and EF1 intensity, moving past several smaller towns. As the tornado moved into Cordova it reached EF3 intensity and heavily damaged the town. The tornado continued to strengthen as it moved across Alabama, reaching EF4 intensity as it passed northwest of Sumiton. The tornado retained this intensity as it caused sporadic damage across rural Alabama, destroying numerous homes and debarking trees. It dissipated south of Red Hill, lifted south-southwest of Guntersville at 5:56 p.m. CDT (22:56 UTC). Thousands of trees were downed along the tornado's path. This tornado was on the ground for two hours and sixteen minutes, tracking for 127.8 miles (205.7 km) across seven counties making it the longest track tornado of the outbreak. It was rated as a low-end EF4 with winds of 170 mph (270 km/h). In total, 13 people were killed and 54 others were injured.

Cordova was devastated by the tornado, which was the second major tornado to hit the community on April 27. Several businesses and other buildings were destroyed or heavily damaged in and outside of the town, and four were killed in the downtown area. The city of Cordova was awarded $5,098,515 (equivalent to $7,297,000 in 2025) to aid with recovery efforts after the tornado; Blount County was awarded $758,572 (equivalent to $1,086,000 in 2025). Recovery efforts continued for months after the tornadoes. In the weeks and months after the tornado, numerous fires started in downtown Cordova within the rubble, which further damaged structures and temporarily stunted recovery efforts.

=== Smithville, Mississippi/Hodges, Alabama ===
Smithville, Mississippi/Hodges, Alabama
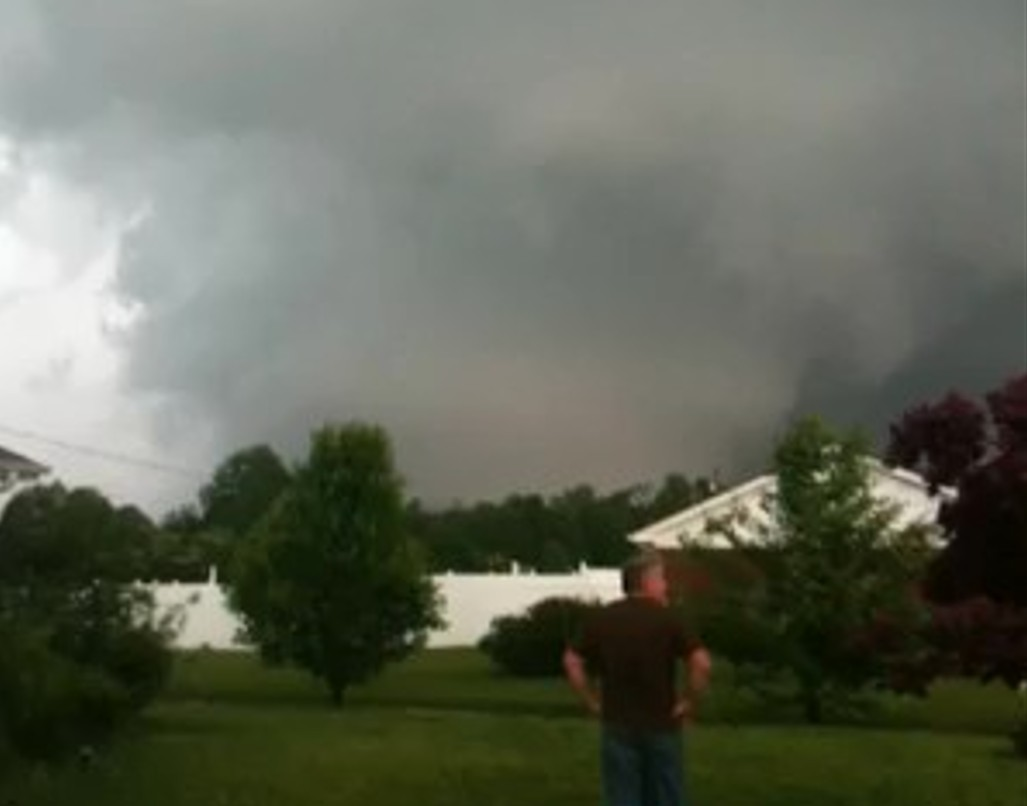
- The tornado at peak intensity in northern Smithville.

Meteorological history
- Formed: April 27, 2011, 3:42 p.m. CDT (UTC−05:00)
- Dissipated: April 27, 2011, 4:23 p.m. CDT (UTC−05:00)
- Duration: 41 minutes

EF5 tornado
- on the Enhanced Fujita scale
- Highest winds: 205 mph (330 km/h)

Overall effects
- Casualties: 23 fatalities, 137 injuries

This extremely violent and fast moving EF5 wedge tornado, with estimated winds of up to 205 mph (330 km/h), struck the town of Smithville, Mississippi, at 3:47 p.m. CDT (20:47 UTC) on April 27, resulting in catastrophic damage and numerous fatalities. The tornado began 3 miles (4.8 km) west-southwest of Smithville along the Tennessee–Tombigbee Waterway near the Glover Wilkins Lock at 3:42 p.m. CDT (20:42 UTC), snapping numerous trees near the Smithville Recreation Area. The tornado then rapidly intensified as it approached town, reaching EF5 intensity. As the storm crossed Davis Road South, the ground was deeply scoured in a nearby field. The tornado swept away numerous homes and structures as it moved northeast, following MS 25. A semi-truck was thrown a considerable distance and destroyed in this area, and at one residence that was swept away, part of the concrete foundation slab was pulled up and dislodged slightly. Multiple well-anchored brick homes were completely swept away, and a large brick funeral home was reduced to a bare slab as the tornado exited at the northeast side of town, with the debris scattered and wind-rowed into an adjacent wooded area. Nearby granite tombstones were blown over in the opposite direction of the tornado's passage. Overall, the tornado destroyed 117 structures in Smithville and damaged 50 others, killing 16 people. The tornado weakened as it continued through rural areas northeast of town and moved into Itawamba County, where it downed numerous trees and power lines and caused roof damage to a house before exiting the county.

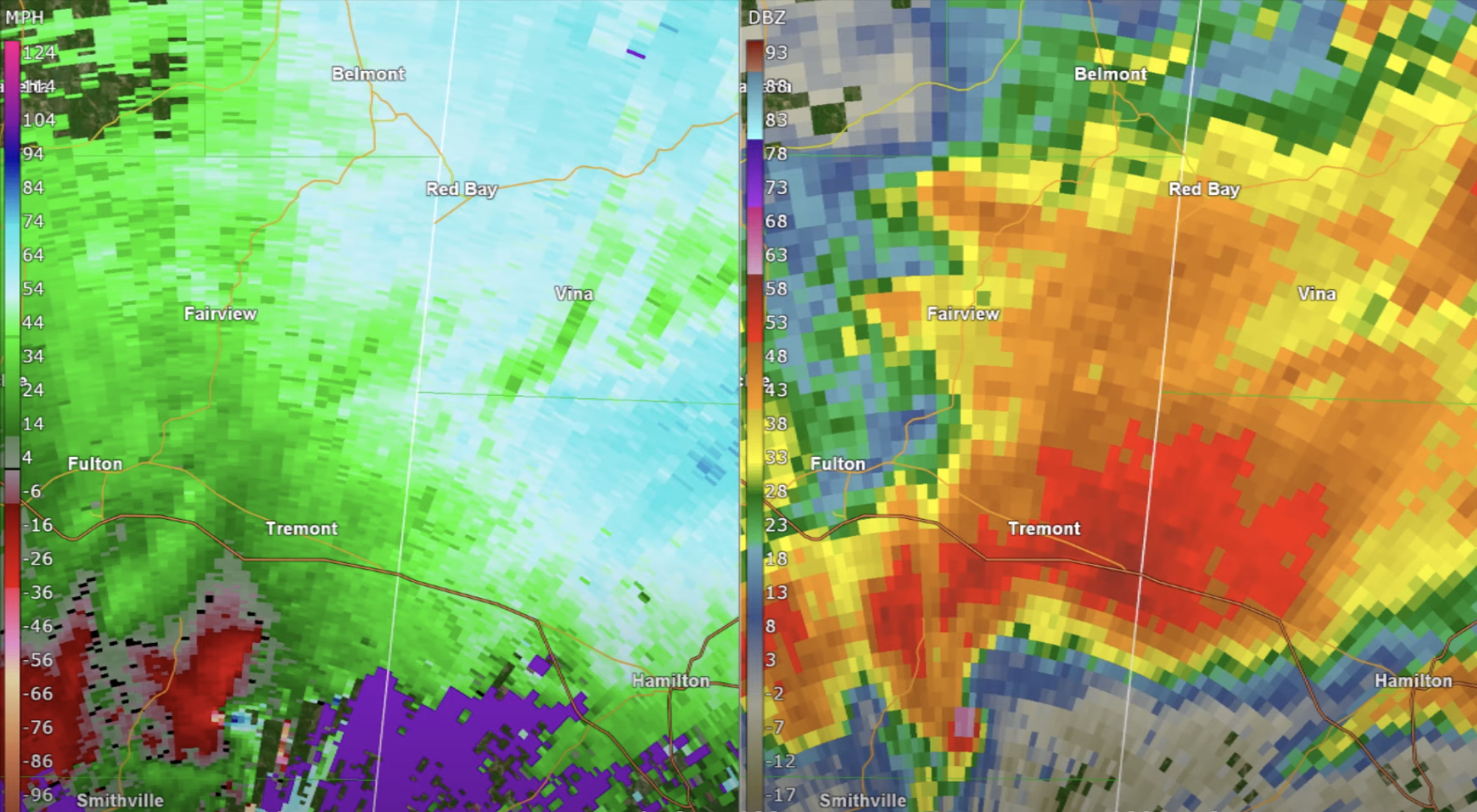
Radar image showing the supercell and hook echo of the storm that produced the Smithville tornado.

The tornado continued across the Alabama state line into Marion County, where it caused EF1-strength damage near Bexar. Continuing northeast, the tornado re-intensified as it struck the rural community of Shottsville at high-end EF3 intensity, where homes and mobile homes were destroyed and seven people were killed, and it produced additional high-end EF3 damage as it continued north of Hamilton. More structures were impacted as the tornado approached and crossed into Franklin County. The tornado then dissipated near the town of Hodges at 4:23 p.m. CDT (21:23 UTC). The damage path was 37.3 miles (60.0 km) long and 3/4 mile (1.2 km) wide at its widest point, and it killed a total of 23 people along its path. 137 other people were injured.

=== Pisgah–Flat Rock–Higdon, Alabama/Trenton, Georgia ===
Pisgah–Flat Rock–Higdon, Alabama/Trenton, Georgia
- The tornado at EF4 intensity north of Pisgah, Alabama, seen from Mentone, Alabama

Meteorological history
- Formed: April 27, 2011, 4:01 p.m. CDT (UTC−05:00)
- Dissipated: April 27, 2011, 5:57 p.m. EDT (UTC−04:00)
- Duration: 56 minutes

EF4 tornado
- on the Enhanced Fujita scale
- Highest winds: 190 mph (310 km/h)

Overall effects
- Casualties: 14 fatalities, 50+ injuries

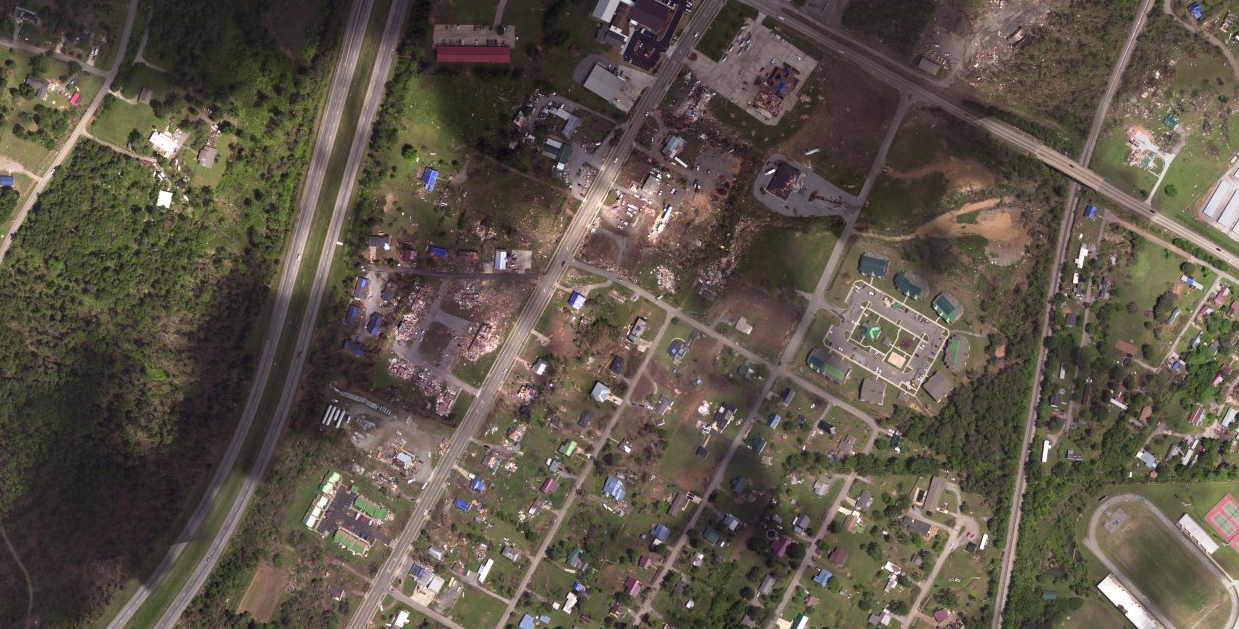
An aerial view of the damage in Trenton, Georgia by the tornado.

This multiple-vortex EF4 tornado that originated from the Cullman supercell, with maximum sustained winds of up to 190 mph (310 km/h), devastated portions of Jackson and DeKalb counties in Alabama, as well as Dade and Walker counties in Georgia along a 47-mile-long (76 km) path at times up to 1,260 yards (1,150 m) wide, killing 14 people and injuring at least 50 others.

The tornado touched down north of Section, initially producing EF0 to EF1 tree damage. The tornado rapidly intensified to low-end EF4 strength as it passed northwest of Pisgah and Rosalie, destroying numerous mobile homes and block foundation homes, scattering the debris hundreds of yards and killing three people. Thousands of trees were snapped and debarked, vehicles were thrown up to 50 yards (46 m) in different directions, and barns and chicken houses were heavily damaged, along with the roof of a church. As it passed near Flat Rock and Higdon, the tornado reached high-end EF4 strength, mowing down thousands of trees in this rural area. The tornado later crossed into Georgia and crossed I-59 as it struck Trenton at EF3 intensity, killing two people. Dozens of homes in Trenton were either completely destroyed or sustained major damage, and tens of thousands of trees were downed in the area. A grocery store, two apartment complexes, and a funeral home were destroyed as well.

The tornado weakened to EF2 strength as it struck Flintstone further to the northeast, but still resulted in major damage. Numerous trees and power lines were downed, 7 homes were destroyed, 26 sustained major damage, and 35 sustained minor damage in the Flintstone area. The tornado continued northeast, weakening to EF0 strength before finally dissipating near Fort Oglethorpe.

=== Tuscaloosa–Birmingham, Alabama ===
Tuscaloosa–Birmingham, Alabama
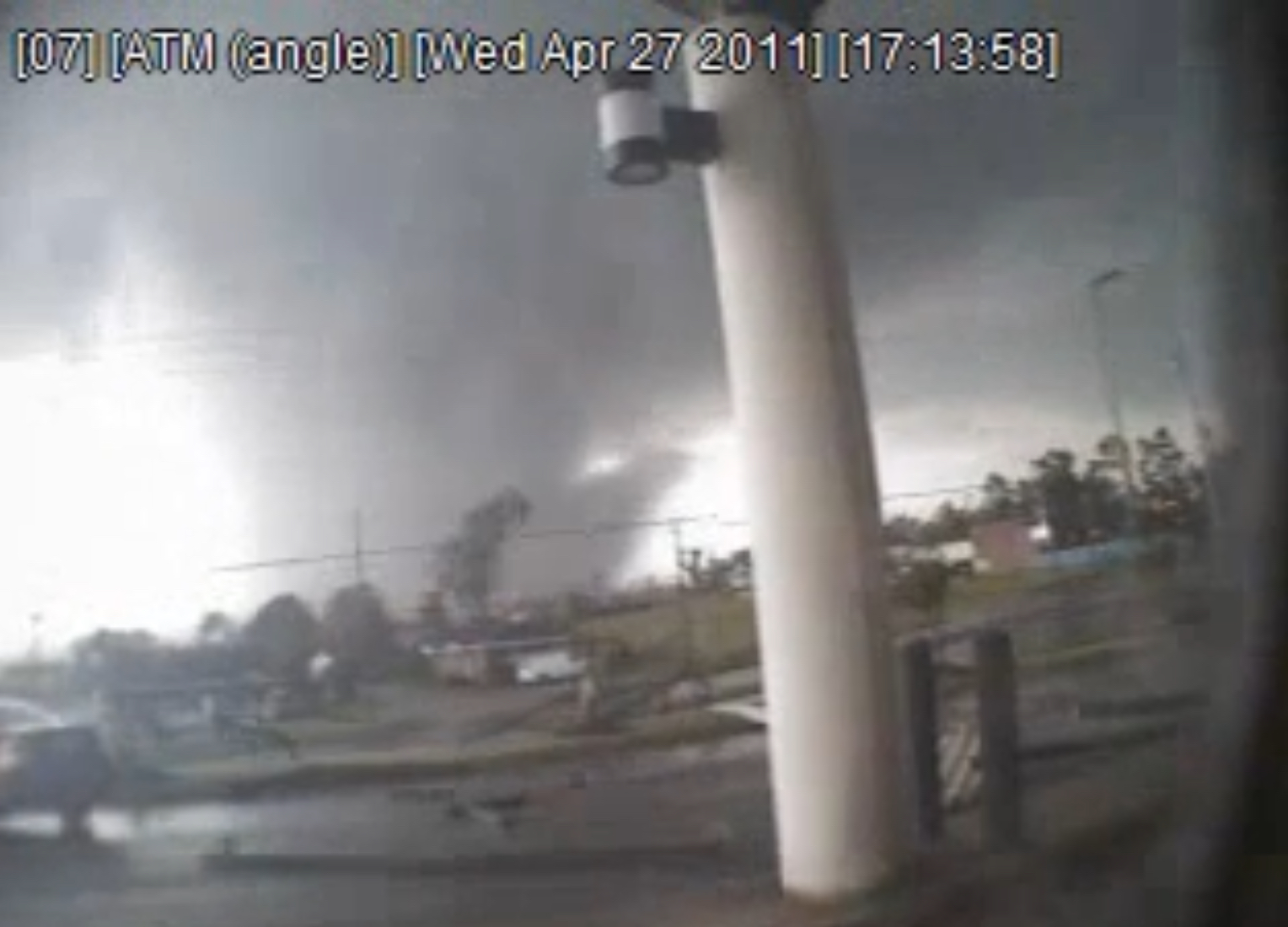
- A CCTV still of the tornado in downtown Tuscaloosa.

Meteorological history
- Formed: April 27, 2011, 4:43 p.m. CDT (UTC−05:00)
- Dissipated: April 27, 2011, 6:14 p.m. CDT (UTC−05:00)
- Duration: 1 hour, 31 minutes

EF4 tornado
- on the Enhanced Fujita scale
- Highest winds: 190 mph (310 km/h)

Overall effects
- Casualties: 64 fatalities, ~1,500 injuries

This large and catastrophic multiple-vortex wedge tornado touched down in rural Greene County, Alabama, and tracked across neighboring Tuscaloosa County, including the southern and eastern portions of Tuscaloosa at around 5:10 p.m. CDT (22:10 UTC) on April 27. Debris from the tornado was reported to be falling from the sky across Birmingham over 20 miles (32 km) away in Jefferson County. Skycams operated by Tuscaloosa television station WVUA-CA (channel 7) as well as Birmingham Fox affiliate WBRC (channel 6), ABC affiliate WBMA-LD/WCFT-TV/WJSU-TV (channels 58, 33, and 40), and CBS affiliate WIAT (channel 42) captured live footage of the tornado as it struck Tuscaloosa; WIAT received awards, including a regional Edward R. Murrow Award for "Outstanding Live Coverage" of the event. As the tornado traveled east to 35th Street and Kauloosa Avenue, the Tuscaloosa Environmental Services and Cintas facilities suffered severe damage. Numerous homes and apartment buildings in the Rosedale and Forest Lake neighborhoods, as well as a P&P Grocery store in Rosedale, were devastated. Several stores and restaurants in a business district at the intersection of McFarland Boulevard and 15th Street, near the DCH Regional Medical Center, were reduced to rubble. Buildings on 35th Street, between I-359/US 11/SR 69 and Martin Luther King Jr. Boulevard, were also completely destroyed. The Alberta City neighborhood in eastern Tuscaloosa sustained catastrophic damage as numerous homes, apartment buildings, and a shopping center were completely leveled. Additional low-end EF4 damage occurred in the Tuscaloosa suburb of Holt further to the northeast, as several homes were leveled or swept away in that area. The tornado then exited the Tuscaloosa area and moved through dense forest towards Birmingham, downing and debarking thousands of trees at low-end EF3 intensity.

The University of Alabama shut down its campus briefly during the course of the storm itself, resuming regular activities within minutes. Upon realizing the extent of the storm damage immediately off-campus, including areas of off-campus student housing, the university shut down all academic and extracurricular activities for the remainder of the day, and then, still later, for the remaining ten days of the academic semester. All final exams were cancelled, with all registered students receiving a final grade based on their grade as of the day of the storm. Spring commencement ceremonies were postponed until August 6. The university itself was undamaged by the storm, though six students enrolled at the university were later discovered to have perished.

Many stations, including WIAT, WBMA/WCFT/WJSU, WTVY (channel 4) in Dothan and WSFA (channel 12) in Montgomery, showed television cameras capturing the event as the tornado moved east-northeast across the western and northern suburbs of Birmingham around 6:00 p.m. CDT (23:00 UTC). It rapidly intensified to its maximum intensity and grew to its maximum width as it approached the area. Several suburbs in the area were severely damaged by the massive tornado as it tore through the west side of Birmingham, resulting in fatalities. The suburbs of Concord and Pleasant Grove were devastated by the high-end EF4 tornado as it moved northeast, flattening entire neighborhoods. The tornado then weakened, but still caused heavy EF2 damage to the community of McDonald Chapel. As the tornado entered the Birmingham city limits, it impacted the Pratt City neighborhood while still at EF2 strength, damaging numerous homes and apartment buildings. The tornado then struck the suburb of Fultondale, causing additional EF2 damage to homes and businesses before rapidly weakening and dissipating north of Tarrant.

The National Weather Service determined the path length of this violent tornado to be 80.7 miles (129.9 km) with a maximum damage path width of 1.5 miles (2.4 km). The tornado's most intense damage indicated peak winds of around 190 mph (310 km/h); therefore, it was given a final rating of EF4. Reports from Tuscaloosa indicated 44 people were killed, with an additional 20 deaths in Birmingham. Overall this tornado killed 64 people and injured more than 1,500. President Barack Obama and First Lady Michelle Obama visited Tuscaloosa on April 29, taking a ground tour of some of the affected areas. Obama was quoted as saying that he had "never seen devastation like this". He stated further that he had already declared a federal state of emergency in Alabama.

=== Fackler–Stevenson–Bridgeport, Alabama/Haletown, Tennessee ===
Fackler–Stevenson–Bridgeport, Alabama/Haletown, Tennessee
- The tornado as it moved through Bridgeport.

Meteorological history
- Formed: April 27, 2011, 5:05 p.m. CDT (UTC−05:00)
- Dissipated: April 27, 2011, 5:31 p.m. CDT (UTC−05:00)
- Duration: 26 minutes

EF4 tornado
- on the Enhanced Fujita scale
- Highest winds: 180 mph (290 km/h)

Overall effects
- Casualties: 1 fatality

This EF4 tornado, with winds of up to 180 mph (290 km/h), touched down in the community of Fackler at 5:05 p.m. CDT (22:05 UTC) on April 27, initially causing minor damage to mobile homes and downing trees. The tornado then moved northeast toward Stevenson, where large trees were downed, several roofs were damaged, a trailer was tipped over, and a shed was partially destroyed. It then reached EF3 intensity, and 24 metal high-tension truss towers were twisted and flattened northeast of Stevenson Airport. In this area, a mobile home was obliterated, and a site-built house collapsed. Two other homes sustained structural damage, two mobile homes were rolled on their side, and a metal barn was destroyed as well. The tornado then continued to the northeast and reached EF4 strength, with the most significant damage being located near the intersection of County Roads 255 and 256. Here, a home was reduced to its foundation, a concrete slab at the front of the home was pulled up, and a set of concrete stairs was ripped from the foundation. A compact car was thrown about 50 yards (46 m) as well.

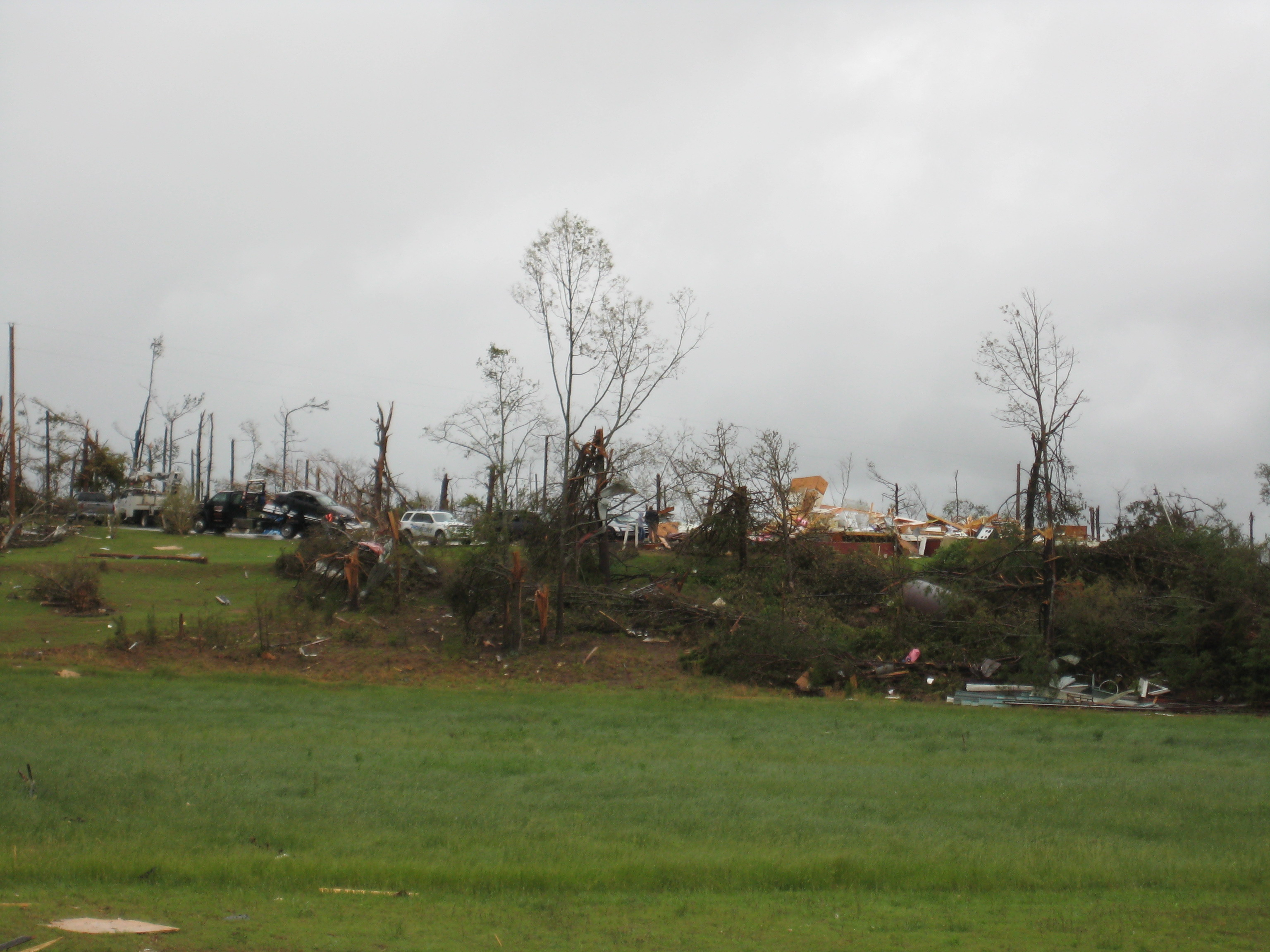
Low-end EF4 damage to a home near Stevenson.

Continuing, the tornado reduced two more well-built and well-anchored homes to their block foundations and threw another car approximately 50 yards (46 m). Several large trees were snapped off just above the ground, a third home was left with no walls standing, and a mobile home was completely demolished and strewn along County Road 256 as well. The tornado continued northeastward, destroying a cinder block garage and damaging a mobile home along 6th Street, just southeast of the city of Bridgeport. It then crossed the Tennessee River, producing significant tree damage as it passed a couple miles to the northwest of Bryant before moving into Marion County, Tennessee. The tornado entered Tennessee along Lakeview Drive near Moore Crossing and Nickajack Dam. It crossed SR 156 near the dam and proceeded to cross Nickajack Lake three times near I-24 at EF2 strength, downing numerous trees before dissipating in a bend of the Tennessee River northeast of Haletown at 5:31 p.m. CDT (22:31 UTC).

The tornado travelled 30.24 miles (48.67 km) through Jackson and Marion Counties and had a peak width of 1,320 yards (1,210 m). One person was killed by the tornado in Jackson County, a teenager near Bridgeport.

=== Pikeville–Haleyville, Alabama ===
Pikeville–Haleyville, Alabama
- The rain-wrapped tornado seen behind a line of trees.

Meteorological history
- Formed: April 27, 2011, 5:10 p.m. CDT (UTC−05:00)
- Dissipated: April 27, 2011, 5:47 p.m. CDT (UTC−05:00)
- Duration: 37 minutes

EF3 tornado
- on the Enhanced Fujita scale
- Highest winds: 150 mph (240 km/h)

Overall effects
- Casualties: 25 injuries

This large, long-tracked intense tornado first touched down along US 43 just southeast of Pikeville in Marion County at 5:10 p.m. CDT. Moving northeastward, the tornado snapped and downed hundreds of trees as it moved through forested areas and crossed CR 37. The tornado then crossed Corridor X/US 78/SR 4, continuing to snap and down trees as it crossed CR 74 and CR 42. As the tornado neared CR 45, it quickly intensified to its peak intensity of mid-range EF3 as it moved along the roadway, impacting six well-built brick homes. Three were left with only interior walls, another lost its second story, roughly half of another home was destroyed, and the last one was unroofed. One mobile home was blown away and never found, another one was rolled and destroyed, and many trees were downed. After crossing SR 253, the tornado continued to cause EF2 tree damage as it moved northeastward before reaching its peak intensity of mid-range EF3 a second time just south of US 278/SR 74. Several outbuildings, including two barns, along with a well-built home on a cinderblock foundation, were obliterated and swept away, with nearby trees snapped and debarked. Several injuries occurred in this area. The tornado then weakened back to EF1 intensity as it crossed US 278/SR 74, mainly snapping and downing trees as it crossed SR 241 and SR 129.

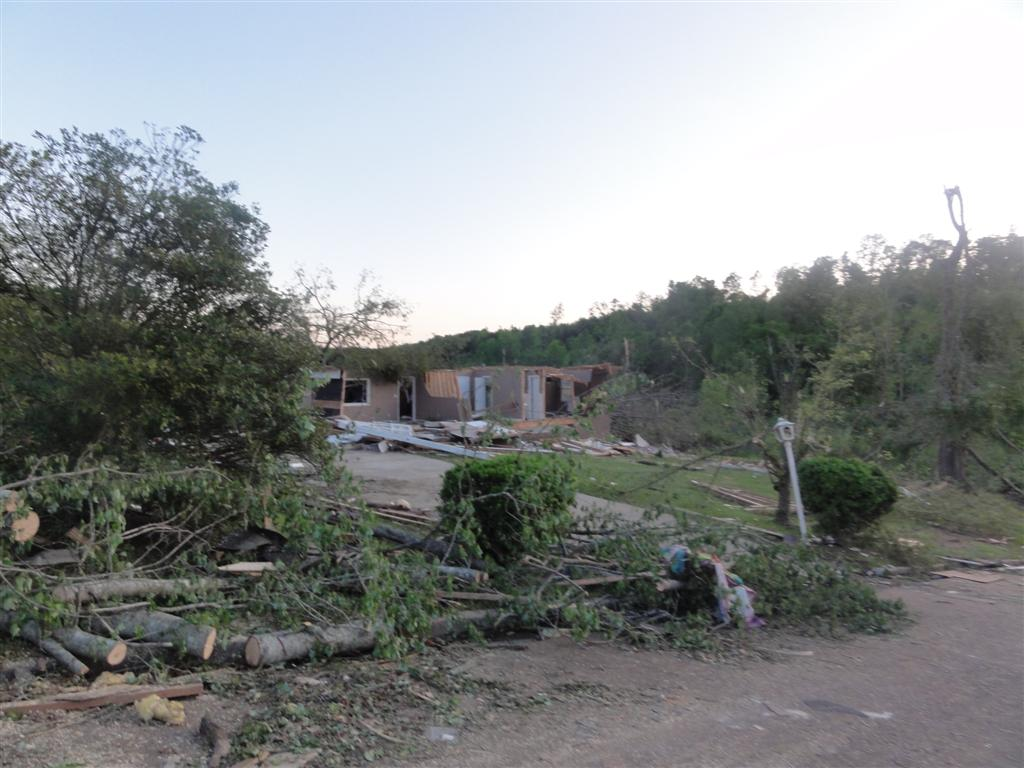
Extensive damage to a home and trees on the south side of Haleyville.

As it approached the Winston County line, the tornado began to intensify again and reached EF3 intensity again as it crossed the county line and struck the south side of South Haleyville. Near the intersection of CR 75 and Dolphin Rd, the tornado destroyed Winston Furniture Company, the Fontaine Trailer Company, and other businesses. The tornado then reached its peak intensity of mid-range EF3 for the final time as it crossed SR 5 and struck a residential neighborhood on the south side of Haleyville. Many homes were extensively damaged or destroyed, with roofs removed and exterior walls knocked down; several homes were deemed to be uninhabitable after the tornado. Large trees were snapped in this area as well. Northeast of there, a home was shifted 10 feet (3.0 m) off its foundation, and a concrete pole was snapped. The tornado then steadily weakened as it continued northeastward, damaging more trees as it moved into William B. Bankhead National Forest and crossed SR 195 and SR 243 before dissipating just before reaching the Lawrence County line.

The tornado was on the ground for 37 minutes, tracked 31.84 mi (51.24 km), and had a maximum width of 1,320 yd (1,210 m). It caused $17 million (2011 USD) in damage and injured 25 people.

=== Sawyerville–Eoline, Alabama ===
Sawyerville–Eoline, Alabama
- The tornado, seen near Forkland at EF2 or EF3 intensity.

Meteorological history
- Formed: April 27, 2011, 5:30 p.m. CDT (UTC−05:00)
- Dissipated: April 27, 2011, 6:55 p.m. CDT (UTC−05:00)
- Duration: 1 hour, 25 minutes

EF3 tornado
- on the Enhanced Fujita scale
- Highest winds: 145 mph (233 km/h)

Overall effects
- Casualties: 7 fatalities, 52+ injuries

This strong and long-tracked EF3 wedge tornado touched down in extreme southwest Greene County to the west-southwest of Tishabee, near the Sumter County border, at 5:30 p.m. CDT (22:30 UTC) and moved northeast. After having touched down in a rural area on the east side of the Tombigbee River, the tornado quickly intensified to high-end EF2 strength along County Road 69. Moving northeast, the tornado damaged a barn and destroyed two small churches and at least four mobile homes. Two people sustained minor injuries in Greene County as the tornado continued along a primarily rural path northeast, moving across the Black Warrior River and into Hale County.

Leaving behind six fatalities and forty more injuries, the tornado maintained its intensity as it moved into the Talladega National Forest. It downed a significant number of trees before moving into Bibb County north of SR 25. In Bibb County, the tornado continued moving northeastward through the Talladega National Forest at EF3 intensity, with thousands more trees being knocked down and partially debarked. Almost immediately after exiting the national forest, the tornado directly impacted the small community of Eoline along US 82, northwest of Brent and Centerville. Around one dozen mobile homes and single-family site-built homes were destroyed.

Northeast of Eoline, the tornado weakened to EF2 intensity, continuing to cause significant damage as it crossed County Road 9, SR 5, and County Road 26, south of West Blocton. Several mobile homes and site-built homes were either destroyed or sustained major damage. Along the path, thousands of trees were downed. The tornado continued to weaken as it moved to the east of West Blocton, continuing to knock down trees. More trees were downed as the tornado crossed the Cahaba River and lifted just northeast of Marvel at 6:55 p.m. CDT (23:55 UTC), not far from the Shelby County border.

The tornado was rated as an EF3, with maximum sustained winds of 145 mph (233 km/h). It remained on the ground for almost an hour and a half, traversing 72.13 miles (116.08 km), being, at times, about one mile (1.6 km) wide. In total, seven people were killed and at least 52 others were injured.

=== Raleigh–Rose Hill–Enterprise, Mississippi/Yantley–Uniontown, Alabama ===
Raleigh–Rose Hill–Enterprise, Mississippi/Yantley–Uniontown, Alabama
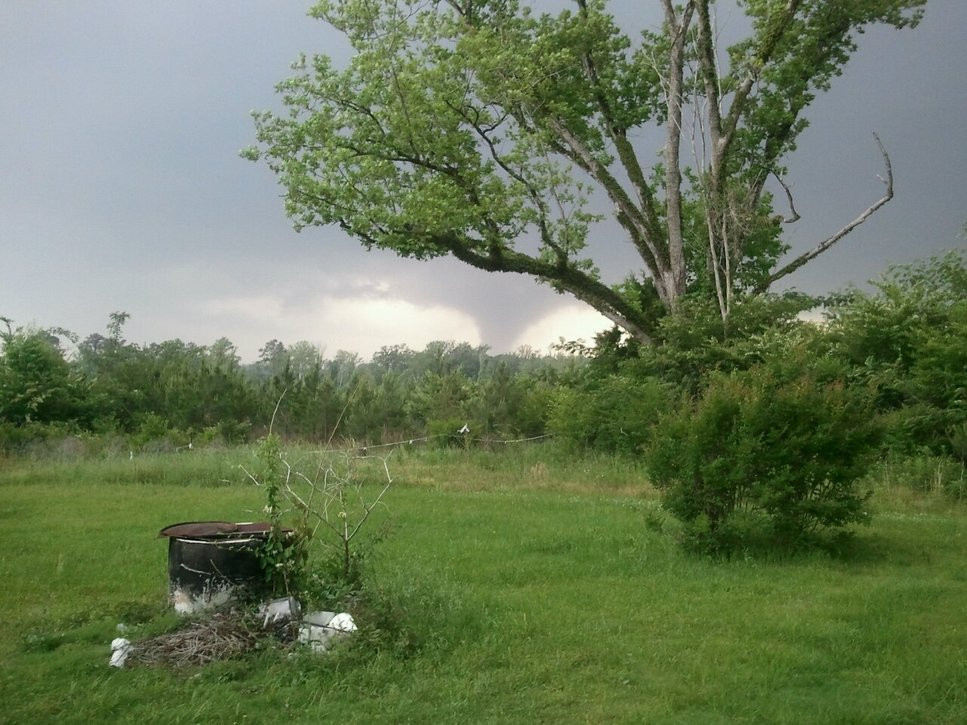
- The EF4 Enterprise tornado, as it was in southeast Mississippi.

Meteorological history
- Formed: April 27, 2011, 5:42 p.m. CDT (UTC−05:00)
- Dissipated: April 27, 2011, 8:35 p.m. CDT (UTC−05:00)
- Duration: 2 hours, 53 minutes

EF4 tornado
- on the Enhanced Fujita scale
- Highest winds: 175 mph (282 km/h)

Overall effects
- Casualties: 7 fatalities, 17 injuries

This extremely long-tracked and violent EF4 tornado touched down near Raleigh, Mississippi, in Smith County at 5:42 p.m. CDT (22:42 UTC), and continued into the Uniontown, Alabama, area before dissipating. The tornado initially downed trees, blew skirting from mobile homes, and tore shingles from roofs. The tornado intensified as it moved northeast across Smith County and produced up to EF2 and EF3 damage. One mobile home was picked up, bounced a couple times, and thrown into a tree line, where it was torn apart and debris was scattered up to a mile away, including the frame. The tornado mowed down a stand of pine trees and destroyed two frame houses, with major damage to the interior walls, and the exterior walls completely destroyed. Many power poles were snapped, a mobile home was annihilated, and a large shop building was completely destroyed as well. It then moved into Jasper County and snapped and debarked many pine trees. The first area of EF4 damage was observed near Louin as a frame home and several mobile homes were completely destroyed, with parts of the mobile homes being thrown long distances, and some of the frame home foundation being swept clean. The tornado caused significant damage to a poultry farm and cattle ranch before it weakened briefly. It then destroyed two mobile homes and caused extensive tree and power line damage. The tornado then produced a relatively narrow path of EF1-strength tree and power line damage for several miles, until re-intensifying near to EF3 strength near Rose Hill.

Southeast of Rose Hill, the tornado removed most of the roof of a frame home and caused heavy damage to the exterior walls, took a large section of roof off another frame home, completely destroyed a large mobile home, and caused extensive tree damage. The tornado then weakened again and entered Clarke County as an EF0 while only downing a few trees. The tornado strengthened again and downed trees and power lines as it crossed I-59. Several other homes and mobile homes were destroyed as the tornado moved along the south side of Enterprise. At the same time, Sean Casey of Team TIV shot the tornado with his new 3D camera as it was crossing I-59, making this the first tornado ever shot in 3D. Another area of EF4 damage was observed east of Enterprise as a new home undergoing completion was leveled, with the debris swept off the foundation. Many more frame homes were heavily damaged nearby. Many mobile homes were destroyed and trees were downed in this area as well. It then weakened slightly to EF3 strength and produced heavy damage to more houses and mobile homes near Snell and Energy. It also downed many more trees and power lines before moving into Choctaw County, Alabama, southwest of Yantley. The tornado killed seven people and injured fourteen others on its 65-mile (105 km) portion of the path that was in Mississippi.

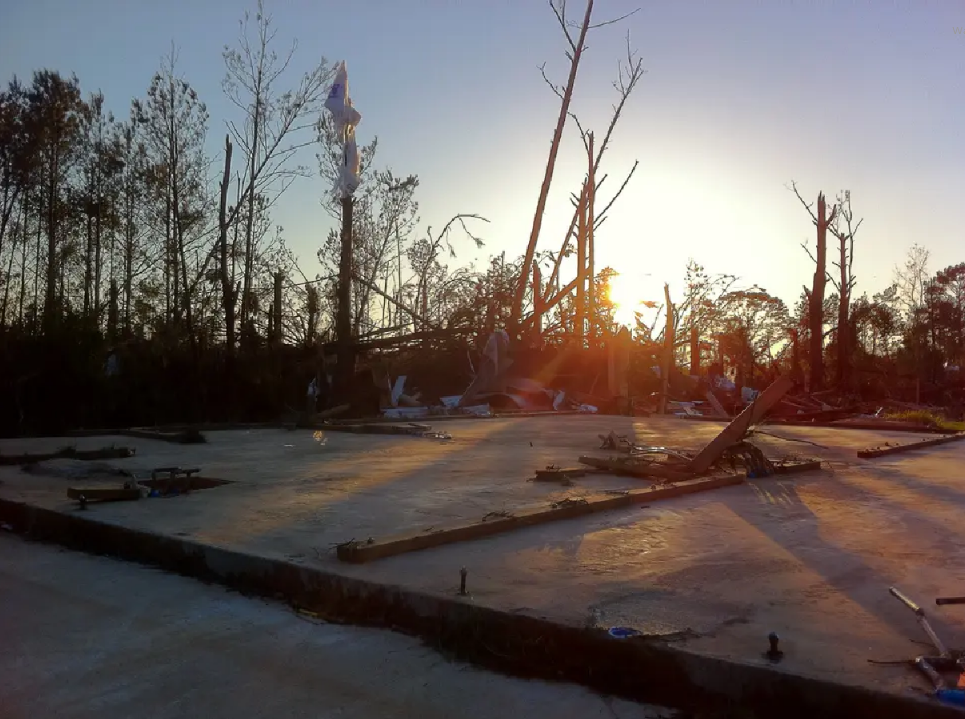
Low-end EF4 damage to a home near Enterprise, Mississippi.

In Choctaw County, the tornado traveled 27.5 miles (44.3 km) as it caused extensive damage to homes (one of which was destroyed at EF3 strength), and numerous other structures. Several mobile homes were destroyed and many trees were either snapped or completely uprooted. The tornado then moved into Sumter County. In Sumter County, the tornado caused significant damage to homes and mobile homes before it crossed the Tombigbee River and moved into Marengo County. It continued causing significant tree damage as well as destroying several homes and outbuildings along a 26.7-mile (43.0 km) path in this county. The tornado then entered Perry County, the final portion of the path, where it damaged two outbuildings and a grain silo as well as causing significant tree damage before lifting just north of Uniontown at 8:35 p.m. CDT (01:35 UTC). The damage in Sumter, Marengo, and Perry Counties was rated EF2.

This tornado was on the ground for nearly three hours, having traveled 122.04 miles (196.40 km) across seven counties in two states. Seven people were killed and another 17 were injured.

=== Fyffe–Rainsville–Sylvania, Alabama/Rising Fawn, Georgia ===
Fyffe–Rainsville–Sylvania, Alabama/Rising Fawn, Georgia
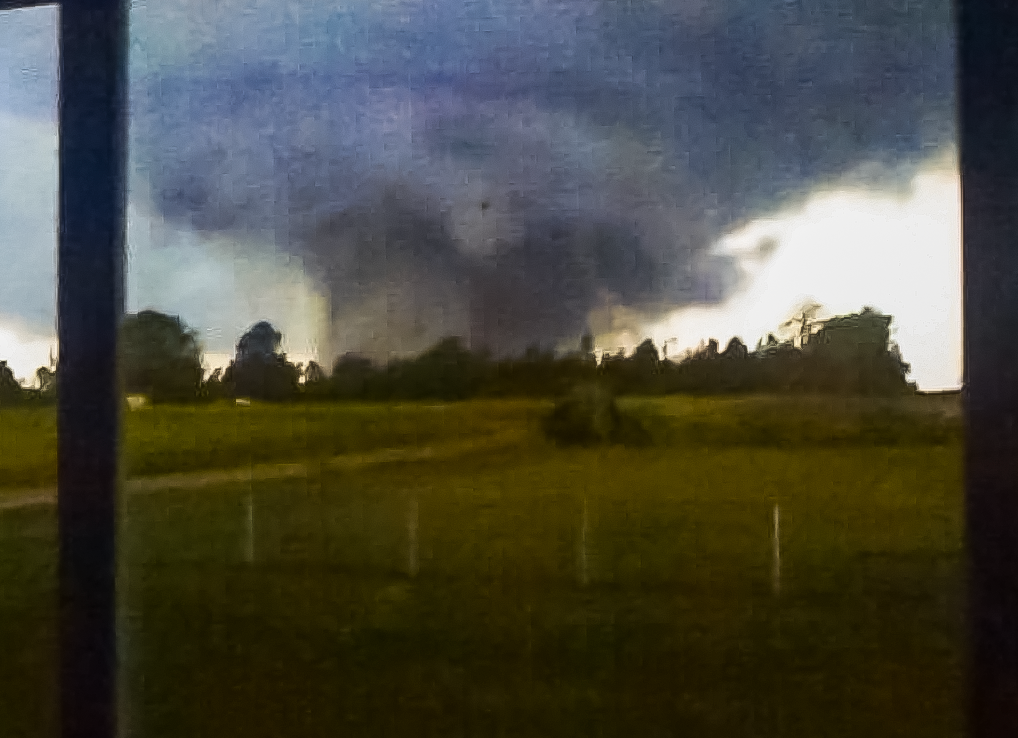
- The Rainsville tornado exiting town at EF5 strength.

Meteorological history
- Formed: April 27, 2011, 6:19 p.m. CDT (UTC−05:00)
- Dissipated: April 27, 2011, 7:55 p.m. EDT (UTC−04:00)
- Duration: 36 minutes

EF5 tornado
- on the Enhanced Fujita scale
- Highest winds: >200 mph (320 km/h)

Overall effects
- Casualties: 25 fatalities, unknown injuries

This violent and devastating multiple-vortex tornado that originated from the Cordova supercell was rated EF5, making it so far the most recent tornado to be rated at that intensity in Alabama. It began in the Lakeview community northeast of Geraldine, Alabama, at 6:19 p.m. CDT (23:19 UTC), during the late afternoon of April 27. The tornado tracked northeastward for 36.63 miles (58.95 km) generally parallel to and just east of SR 75 through Fyffe, Rainsville, and Sylvania and into Georgia, killing 25 people.

Initial damage in Lakeview consisted of structural damage to small buildings and snapped trees. The tornado grew in intensity as it struck Fyffe, where more significant damage occurred. Past Fyffe, the tornado became violent, and its width increased from around 50 yards (46 m) to 0.5 miles (800 m) as it entered eastern Rainsville, reaching EF5 intensity as it destroyed numerous homes and businesses. A Huddle House restaurant, the Rainsville Civic Center, and a credit union were destroyed. Vehicles were also thrown, including a school bus that was completely stripped down to its chassis. Numerous homes in the Rainsville area were swept completely away, with debris strewn up to a mile from the foundations. Some of these homes were connected to their foundations with anchor bolts and foundation straps. Trees were debarked and mobile homes were completely destroyed as well. Damage was particularly intense just northeast of Rainsville, and one well-built stone house in this area was completely obliterated, with the debris strewn well away from the structure. A large supporting cement and stone pillar was ripped completely out of the ground at this residence, pulling up a section of concrete foundation in the process. Scouring and pock-marking of the ground was noted in this area. Numerous homes were swept away along Lingerfelt Road as well. At one house that was swept away in this area, supporting concrete anchors were ripped out of the ground, a concrete porch was ripped off with pieces strewn up to 150 yards (140 m) away, a pick-up truck from the home was found mangled in pieces over 250 yards (230 m) away, and a safe weighing 800 pounds (360 kg) was pulled off its anchorage and thrown into a wooded area 600 feet (180 m) away. When found, the safe's door had been ripped open and completely off. An underground storm shelter in this area had much of its dirt covering scoured away, the occupants of which reported that structure heaved upwards slightly as the tornado passed overhead. Pavement was scoured from several roads in the area, and a concrete porch was torn away and broken in half at another residence that was swept away.

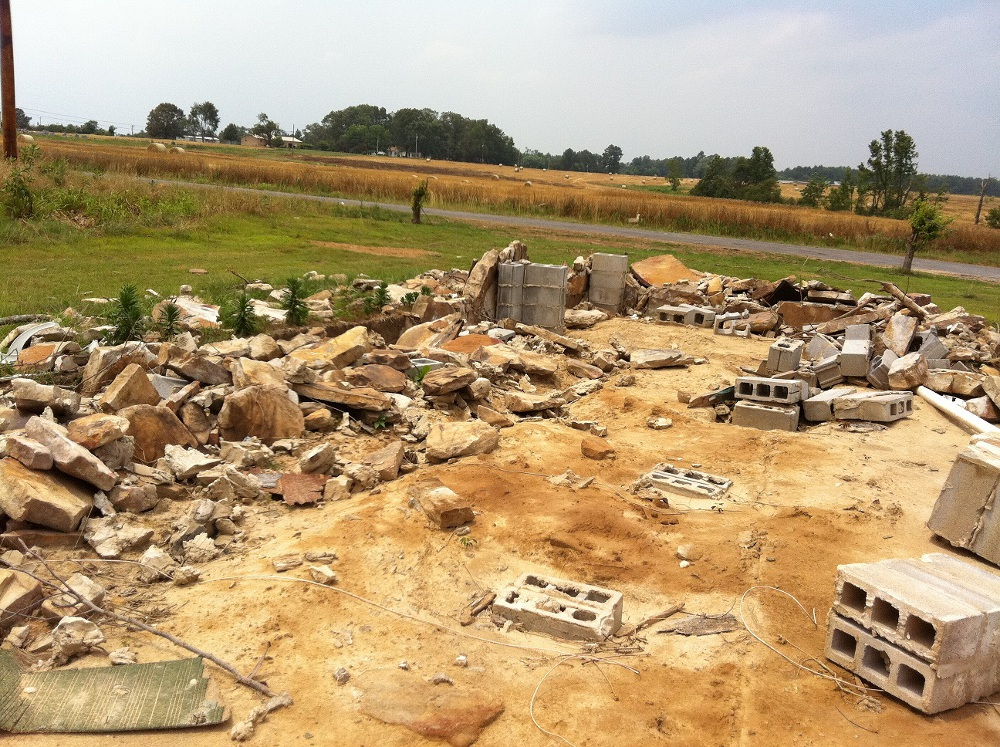
An obliterated home along Skaggs Road.

The tornado continued across the eastern fringes of Sylvania, where a church was completely destroyed, a section of sidewalk was pulled up, and additional homes were swept away and scattered, though it was revealed that these homes were pushed off their foundations with limited anchorage. A high-end EF4 rating was applied in this area as a result. The tornado continued to level additional homes as it passed near Henagar and Ider, at which point it began to closely parallel I-59. It crossed into Georgia near Fox Mountain at EF1 intensity with winds of 110 mph (180 km/h). It tracked three miles (4.8 km) into Georgia, crossing I-59 and moving through Rising Fawn before lifting outside of the community at 6:55 p.m. CDT/7:55 p.m. EDT (23:55 UTC). Damage in Georgia was limited to trees and power lines and minor structural damage to a few homes. This tornado came from the same supercell that produced the EF4 tornado that hit the town of Ringgold, Georgia, about 30 minutes later.

=== Shoal Creek Valley–Ohatchee–Piedmont, Alabama/Cave Spring, Georgia ===
Shoal Creek Valley–Ohatchee–Piedmont, Alabama/Cave Spring, Georgia
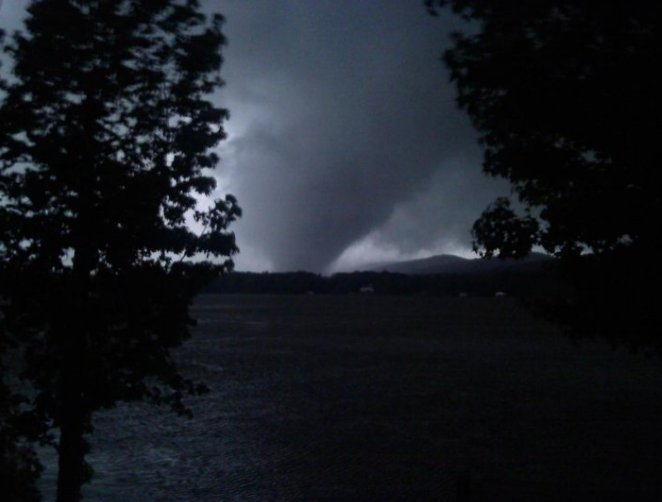
- The Shoal Creek Valley/Ohatchee EF4 tornado.

Meteorological history
- Formed: April 27, 2011, 6:28 p.m. CDT (UTC−05:00)
- Dissipated: April 27, 2011, 9:15 p.m. EDT (UTC−05:00)
- Duration: 1 hour, 47 minutes

EF4 tornado
- on the Enhanced Fujita scale
- Highest winds: 180 mph (290 km/h)

Overall effects
- Casualties: 22 fatalities, 85 injuries

After the Tuscaloosa/Birmingham tornado dissipated, the same supercell produced this EF4 tornado at 6:28 p.m. CDT (23:28 UTC) near Argo, Alabama, in eastern Jefferson County. It went on to devastate the rural community of Shoal Creek Valley, located between Ashville and Ragland in St. Clair County, Alabama.

After touching down southwest of Argo, the tornado continued northeast of Odenville, producing EF0 to EF1 tree damage. Further east, the tornado intensified to EF3 strength and entered the rural community of Shoal Creek Valley, following along County Road 22/Shoal Creek Road for approximately 12.5 miles (20.1 km), with the path and width varying greatly along the road. Many homes were left with only interior walls standing in this area. Some section of this path segment had damage that was much worse on one side of the road than the other, while other areas showed equal devastation on both sides of the road. The tornado reached mid-range EF4 intensity towards the end of the valley as it approached Neely Henry Lake. Additional homes were destroyed in this area, one was swept away, and thousands of trees were mowed down and debarked. The tornado maintained EF4 strength as it crossed the lake and tore across the north edge of Ohatchee, completely leveling or sweeping away numerous waterfront homes. Damage ranged from downed trees and roof damage to total destruction as the tornado roared through this area at 50–60 mph (80–97 km/h), packing winds of over 180 mph (290 km/h). The official count of homes destroyed or heavily damaged in Shoal Creek Valley and Ohatchee was 256. Most phone lines, power lines and poles were destroyed, and water lines were severed by uprooted trees. Entire homes were leveled, and in some cases completely removed by the storm, leaving only brick steps, a fireplace and chimney, or a slab behind. Barns, vehicles, tractors and heavy farming equipment were shredded and thrown up to 0.5 miles (0.80 km) away from where they originated. Livestock were thrown and killed, and the initial human death toll of 13 would eventually rise to 15 in the area.

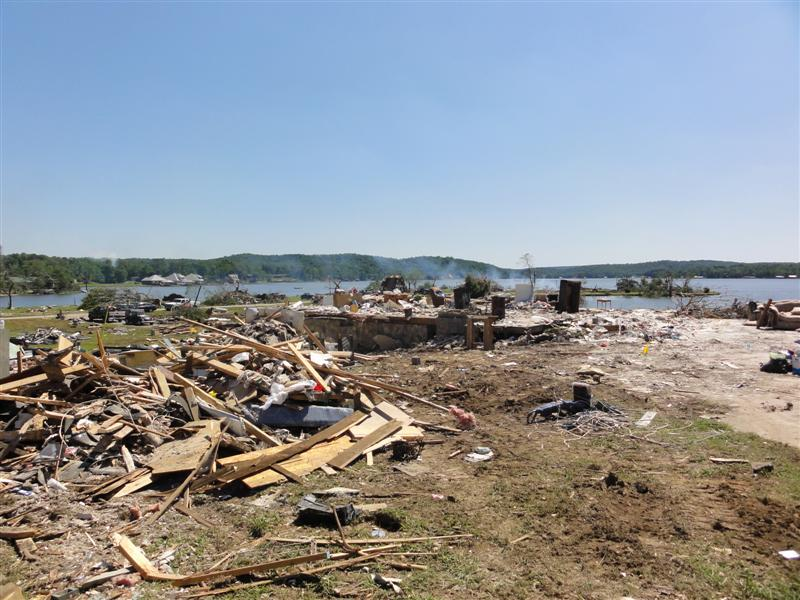
A home swept off its foundation along Robins Mill Road.

The tornado caused mainly EF3 damage to homes as it passed north of Wellington, though a small pocket of EF4 damage occurred in the small rural community of Webster's Chapel, where a church and several homes were completely leveled or swept away, trees were reduced to stumps, and many other homes were left with only interior walls standing. The Silver Lakes Golf Course also sustained major damage in this area, where at least 50,000 trees were flattened and buildings were damaged or destroyed. Continuing northeast, the tornado produced high-end EF3 damage north of Piedmont, destroying mobile homes, snapping numerous trees, and leveling a house. Additional homes were leveled at high-end EF3 intensity near The Indian Mountain Tract before it continued across rural areas into Georgia. Many outbuildings and homes were destroyed, and many trees were downed across Polk, Floyd, and Bartow counties. Severe damage was noted near Cave Spring where chicken houses and homes were damaged or destroyed, and several people were injured. The damage in Georgia was rated EF2. The tornado finally dissipated near Kingston, Georgia, after having travelled for 97.33 miles (156.64 km) over the span of an hour and 47 minutes.

This tornado's final death toll, combining fatalities in both St. Clair and Calhoun counties in Alabama, would eventually come to 22.

=== Ringgold, Georgia/Apison, Tennessee ===
Ringgold, Georgia/Apison, Tennessee
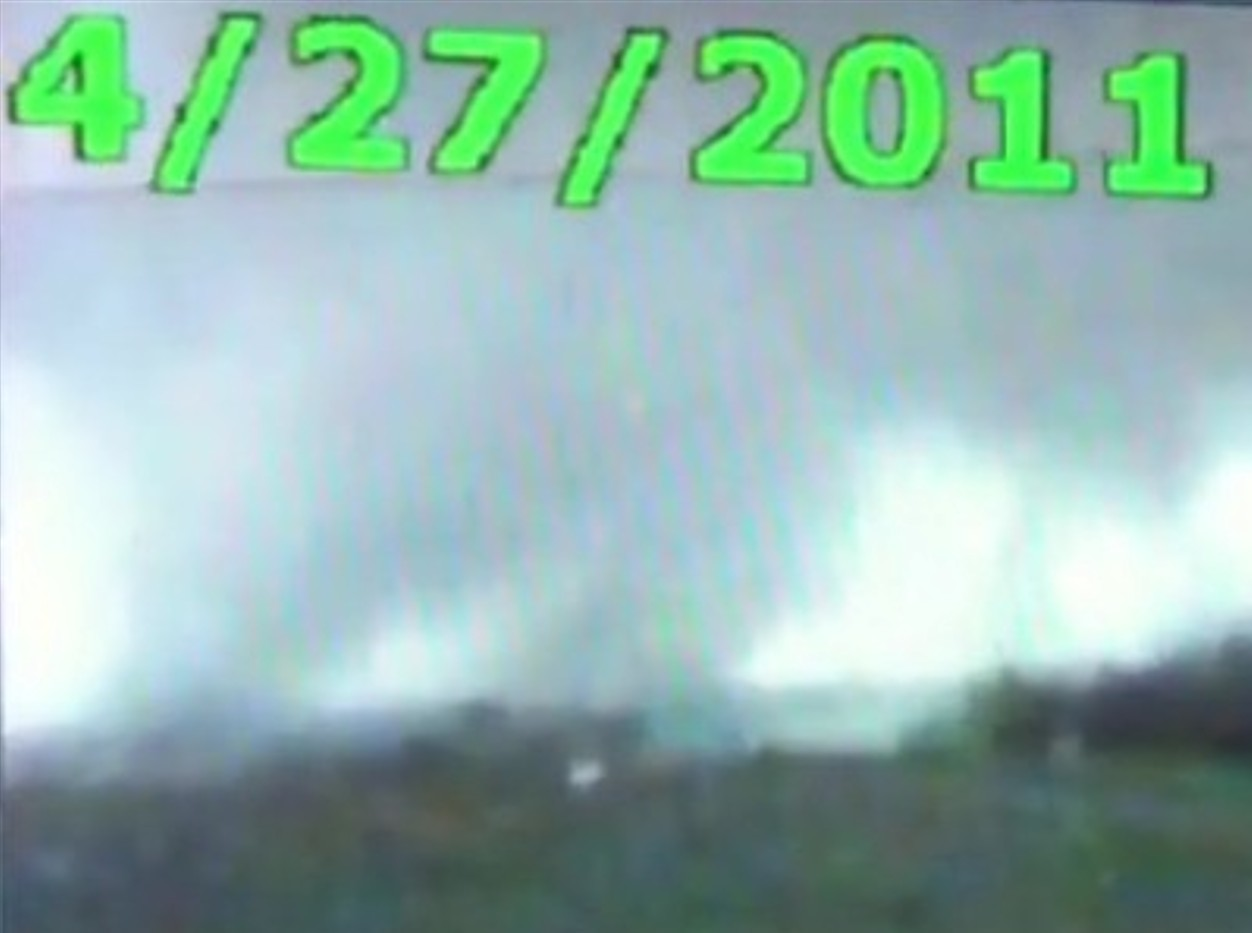
- A CCTV still of the tornado near Ringgold.

Meteorological history
- Formed: April 27, 2011, 8:15 p.m. EDT (UTC−04:00)
- Dissipated: April 27, 2011, 9:07 p.m. EDT (UTC−04:00)
- Duration: 52 minutes

EF4 tornado
- on the Enhanced Fujita scale
- Highest winds: 190 mph (310 km/h)

Overall effects
- Casualties: 24 fatalities, 335 injuries

From the same supercell that spawned the EF5 tornado that struck Rainsville, this violent multiple-vortex tornado struck portions of extreme northern Georgia and southeast Tennessee during the mid-evening of April 27. It touched down along Davis Ridge Road in Catoosa County, Georgia, and moved through the town of Ringgold at EF3 strength, destroying numerous homes and businesses. A Baymont Inn & Suites, located near I-75 was partially destroyed by the tornado, along with a McDonald's, a Taco Bell, and several gas stations located on SR 151 in Ringgold at the I-75 interchange (exit 348). The Catoosa County Department of Family and Children Services and other businesses on Nashville Street in downtown Ringgold were also heavily damaged. The Kellerhals Center for Visual Arts Education at Ringgold High School was destroyed (RHS itself had minor damage), and Ringgold Middle School was heavily damaged. Past downtown Ringgold, the tornado reached EF4 intensity as it tore through a subdivision along Cherokee Valley Road at the north edge of town. Twelve homes were completely obliterated and swept away at that location (though they were not well-built). Several trees were denuded and debarked in this area as well. There were 74 destroyed homes and/or businesses, 60 with major damage, and 118 with minor damage for a total of 252 affected structures in the Ringgold area. Eight people were killed, mainly at the subdivision along Cherokee Valley Road.

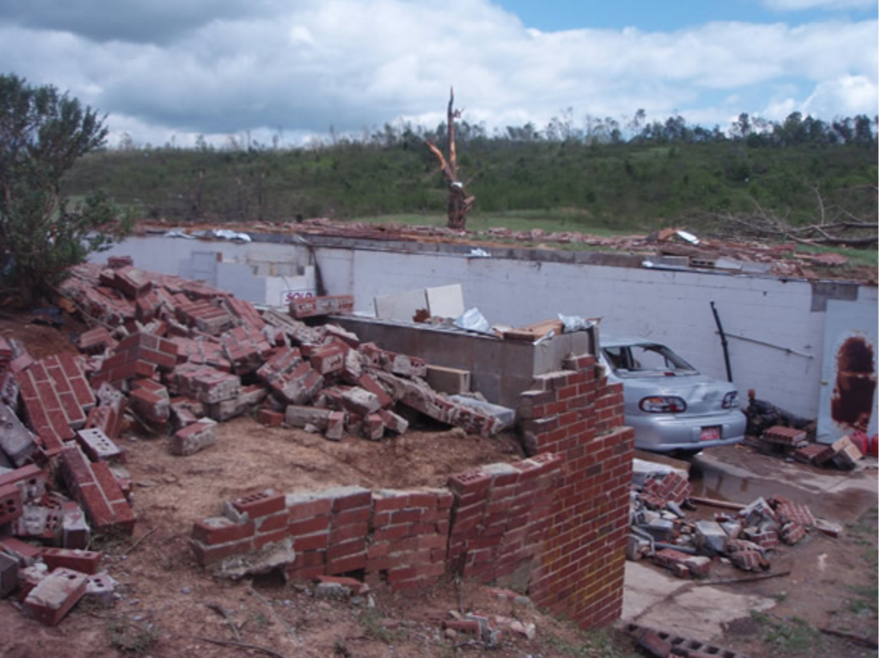
EF4 damage to a large brick home in Apison, Tennessee.

The storm then crossed the Tennessee state line at 8:28 p.m. EDT (00:28 UTC), and moved into Hamilton County, Tennessee, striking the small town of Apison at high-end EF4 strength, where large homes were leveled or swept away, 150 others were damaged, and thousands of trees were snapped and uprooted. The tornado then crossed into Bradley County at low-end EF4 strength, moving across the southern and eastern fringes of Cleveland and affecting mainly residential areas, though a few businesses were damaged or destroyed as well. Subdivisions in the southern part of the city sustained major damage, with numerous houses destroyed and a few that were leveled. Four people were killed in Cleveland, and many others were injured. Several trees were felled in Polk County as the tornado weakened to EF1-strength, before it crossed into McMinn County. The tornado re-intensified to EF2 and destroyed two houses and a mobile home before lifting south of Athens.

The tornado killed 20 people and injured hundreds more along its 48-mile (77 km) path across Catoosa, Hamilton, Bradley, Polk, and McMinn counties. The tornado was given a rating of EF4 with peak wind speed of 190 mph (310 km/h). The damage path of the tornado was 1/2 mile (0.80 km) wide. This tornado was only the eighth in Georgia to be categorized as an F4/EF4 since 1950, when current official tornado records begin. It would be the last EF4 tornado in the state until March 26, 2021, when Newnan was struck just after midnight.

All roads in and out of Ringgold were closed until the morning of April 29; after roads leading to the affected areas were re-opened, residents and business owners were allowed to return, being allowed entry only by providing identification, and informing police a reason why they were entering into the area, in order to curb looting in the storm-damaged areas.

=== Dunlap–New Harmony–Graysville, Tennessee ===
Dunlap–New Harmony–Graysville, Tennessee
- Damage in Pitts Gap, Tennessee

Meteorological history
- Formed: April 27, 2011, 8:06 p.m. CDT (UTC-05:00)
- Dissipated: April 27, 2011 9:41 p.m. EDT (UTC-05:00)
- Duration: 35 minutes

EF4 tornado
- on the Enhanced Fujita scale
- Highest winds: 190 mph (310 km/h)

Overall effects
- Casualties: 4 fatalities, 12 injuries

This long tracked and violent tornado carved a 40.2 mile (67.4 km) path across eastern Tennessee, including Sequatchie, Bledsoe, and Rhea Counties. The tornado killed a total of 4 people, and injured 12. The tornado was rated EF4 on The Enhanced Fujita Scale, and cost a total $17.00 Million dollars in damage (2011 USD). This tornado first touched down in Sequatchie County west of Dunlap. The tornado would cause significant damage to trees and powerlines throughout its path in Sequatchie County, including the southern side of Dunlap. Multiple homes suffered minor damage. After exiting Dunlap, the tornado would continue towards the northeast into Bledsoe County, and would begin to rapidly intensify to High-End EF4 intensity as it approached and hit Walden Ridge, and the southern side of Pitts Gap. In both Walden Ridge and Pitts Gap, numerous mobile homes were completely destroyed and ripped away resulting in two fatalities. An additional two fatalities had also occurred when the tornado had struck a camper-trailer, which three people had been residing in at the time, with only one resident of the camper-trailer surviving, yet sustaining major injuries. An apartment made of metal located in Pitts Gap was completely swept off of its concrete foundation. No Fatalities occurred in this apartment. The tornado would continue to destroy over two dozen homes as it tracked into the community of New Harmony, where a 1,000+ acre farm was completely destroyed. The tornado continued to the northeast into Rhea County, where several more homes were completely destroyed at EF4 intensity west of Graysville, and numerous trees and power lines were downed. However, the tornado had begun to rapidly weaken, and the tornado would dissipate as it struck Spring City.

=== Eclectic–Lake Martin–Dadeville, Alabama ===
Eclectic–Lake Martin–Dadeville, Alabama
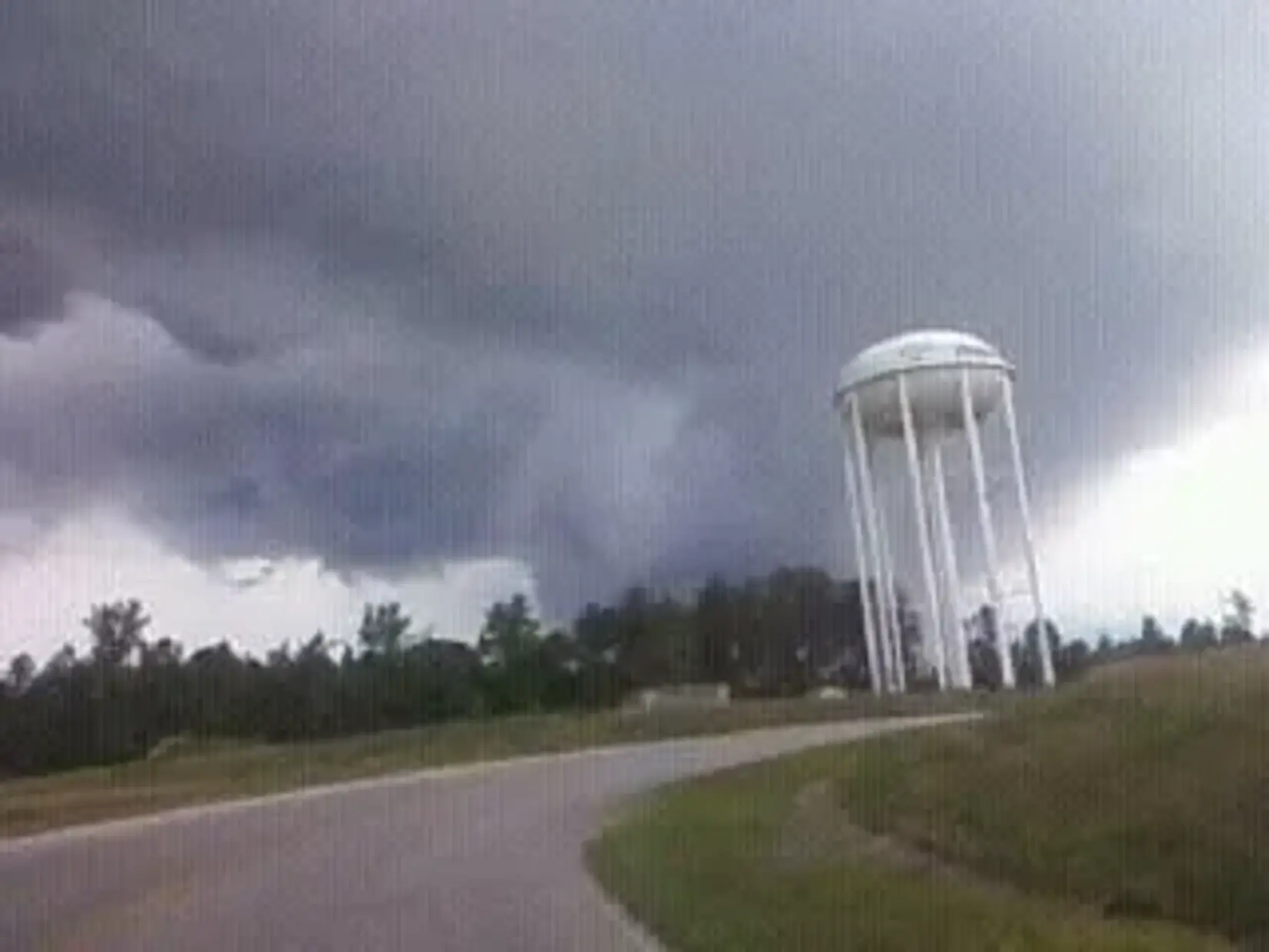
- The tornado being illuminated by lightning as it approached Lake Martin.

Meteorological history
- Formed: April 27, 2011, 8:12 p.m. CDT (UTC–05:00)
- Dissipated: April 27, 2011, 9:09 p.m. CDT (UTC–05:00)
- Duration: 57 minutes

EF4 tornado
- on the Enhanced Fujita scale
- Highest winds: 170 mph (270 km/h)

Overall effects
- Casualties: 7 fatalities, 30 injuries

This long-tracked and violent tornado struck areas around Lake Martin in east central Alabama. The tornado caused large swaths of EF4 damage, particularly to homes on the shores of Lake Martin. Many homes were completely swept off their foundations, and hundreds of trees were uprooted by the tornado. It reached EF3 intensity at least three times, and reached its maximum intensity of low-end EF4 in Lake Martin.

The tornado first touched down north of Wetumpka in Elmore County, south of Charity Lane at approximately 8:12 p.m. CDT (01:12 UTC). It began to track just east of due north along Grier Road (CR 209) at high-end EF1 intensity, snapping trees and blowing out the south facing gable-end of the roof of a home. The tornado then turned northeastward, continuing to snap and uproot trees as it moved through generally unpopulated, rural areas. The tornado then intensified to high-end EF2 intensity with winds of 130 mph (210 km/h) as it passed through the northwest side of Dexter, heavily damaging several homes. One home had its roof removed and a section of an exterior wall knocked down and a mobile home was rolled and obliterated with the debris blown several hundred yards. The residents of the mobile home had seen the tornado warning issued on their TV and went to a neighbor's house for safety before the tornado struck. There was major damage to farm equipment and outbuildings in this area as well.

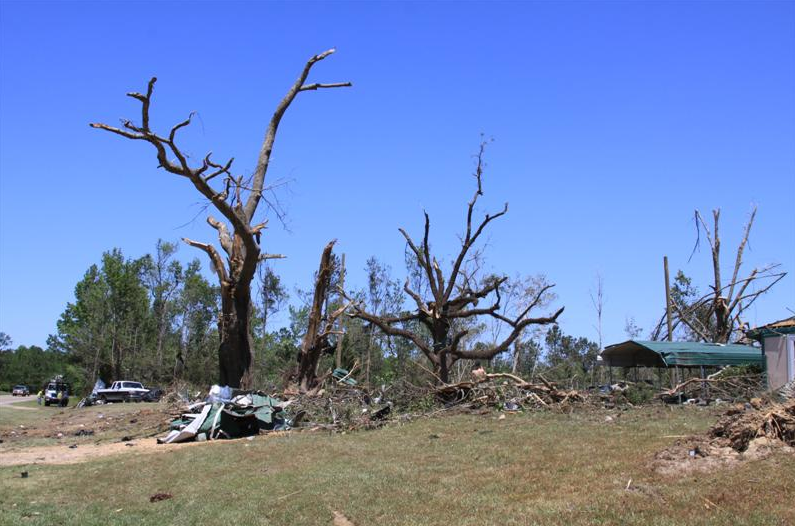
EF2 damage to trees located off AL 9 northeast of Dexter.

The tornado continued northeastward through forested areas, continuing to cause EF2 damage. A home along Powell Road had its roof removed and multiple exterior walls knocked down. Eight people in the home received the warning and took shelter in a hallway before the tornado struck; only one of them was injured. Three barns and several outbuildings and tractors on the property were completely destroyed as well. The tornado then tracked over neighborhoods along SR 9, damaging several homes, and debarking and snapping trees. Another mobile home in this area was rolled and disintegrated with the appliances found 400 yards (370 m) away. The occupants heard warning and sought shelter in the basement of a home across the road before. The tornado then passed south of Central, continuing to cause EF2 damage in densely forested areas.

The tornado then intensified to EF3 strength as it reached Central Road (CR 418). A mobile home along the road was completely destroyed; its two occupants heard the warning, but were unable to get to safe shelter, resulting in them being trapped and seriously injured in the debris of the home. Northeast of there along Old Colley Road (CR 417), several homes had their roofs blown off with one home having exterior walls knocked down. The tornado then crossed the Middle Road and Auction Barn Road intersection and struck a mobile home park, destroying 10 mobile homes and killing four people. A home in the park was struck by the debris from the mobile homes and the exterior and the interior walls in the middle of the home were knocked down. The tornado then weakened to EF2 intensity as it continued to track northeastward through densely forested areas and passed just narrowly south of the town of Falkner, causing mainly tree damage, although one home along Union Road suffered heavy roof and exterior wall damage. The tornado then strengthened to EF3 intensity again as it moved along Mount Hebron Road (CR 80) east of Falkner. Several homes, businesses, including the W W Monument Company, two churches, and an agricultural nursery were completely destroyed in this area. One of the churches (Mount Baptist Church) had sanctuary debris blown 100–200 yards (91–183 m), the second-story of a split level home was removed, and a home along Nero Rock Road was unroofed and had two exterior walls knocked down. The tornado then weakened back to EF2 intensity and passed just north of Jordan, narrowly missing it. As it approached Lake Martin, the tornado uprooted and snapped numerous trees. The tornado then crossed over SR 63 and tracked into the Lake Martin area, maintaining EF2 strength as it crossed over the lake south of the SR 63 bridge. After moving ashore, the tornado regained EF3 intensity as it grew to its peak width of 0.5 miles (0.80 km) and reached Windermere. Numerous trees were snapped and partially debarked, thin electrical transmission towers were crumbled, and numerous homes suffered significant damage.

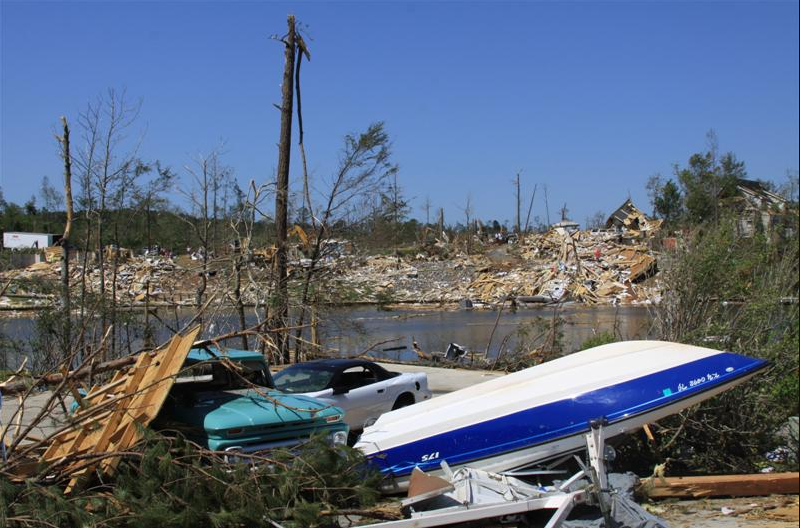
EF4 damage to lakeside homes and boats on Mountain View Way

The tornado then tracked back into Lake Martin and crossed in Tallapoosa County while retaining EF3 intensity. The tornado then became violent, reaching low-end EF4 strength with winds up to 170 mph (270 km/h) as it moved ashore on Stoney Ridge Road. Several well-built multi-story homes were leveled with no walls left standing above the basement level. This included a two-story home located on the northern portion of Sandy Lane that was leveled with debris from the structure thrown into the lake. Four lakeside homes located off Mountain View Way were also leveled. Continuing northeastward, the tornado narrowed to 400 yards (370 m), but remained at low-end EF4 intensity as it crossed SR 49, destroying two homes. One of the homes was a wood-frame house on a CMU stack column pier foundation; this home was completely obliterated and a Ford F-150 pickup truck that was parked in the driveway was thrown over 150–200 yards (140–180 m) and mangled.

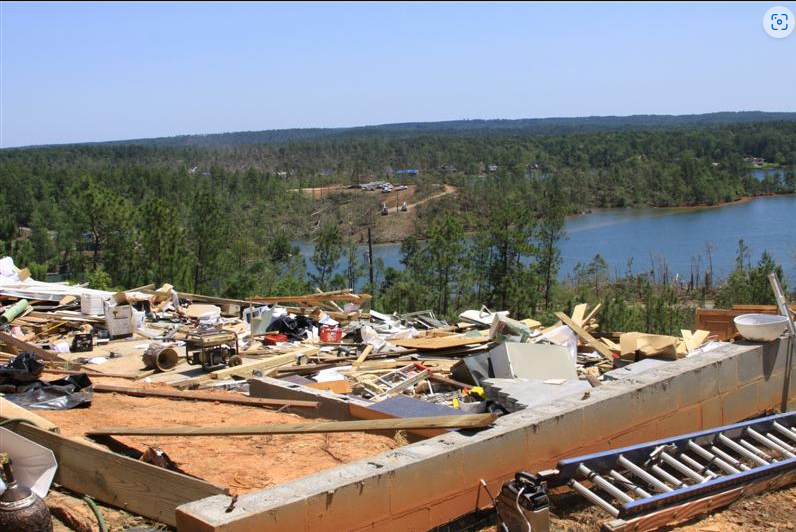
EF4 damage to a two-story house along Lake Martin

Trees were also debarked in the area of the slabbed residence. The tornado then weakened to EF3 intensity as it continued northeastward and tracked through forested areas before moving into the southeastern part of Dadeville. The tornado then crossed US 280 on the east side of town, significantly damaging several homes and businesses. An elderly woman was killed in one of the homes and winds in this area were estimated to be up to 155 mph (249 km/h). The tornado continued northeastward through forested areas, before crossing into Chambers County.

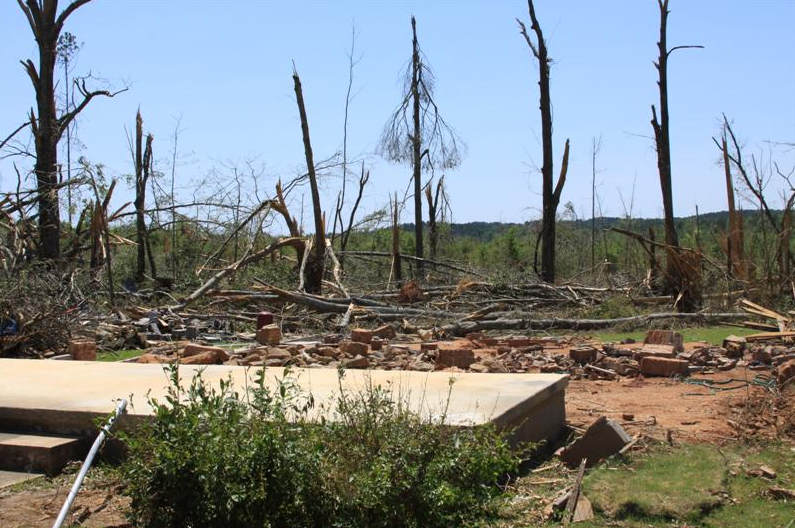
EF3 damage to a 100-year-old home located on County Road 54

The tornado remained at EF3 intensity as it moved into Chambers County and continued its northeastward heading. Along County Road 54, a 100-year-old wood-framed home on a brick column pier raised foundation was completely obliterated; winds in this area were estimated to be up to 150 mph (240 km/h). The tornado then gradually weakened as it continued northeastward through densely forested areas. Trees were snapped or uprooted along this final portion of the path before the tornado dissipated at 9:09 p.m. CDT (02:09 UTC) after tracking 44.18 miles (71.10 km) and reaching a maximum width of 880 yards (800 m). Pilot Charles Moon surveyed the path and drew out an area of "total destruction". Losses totaled $167 million (2011 USD). Seven people were killed by the tornado, and 30 others were injured.

=== Turners Corner–Lake Burton–Mountain City, Georgia ===
Turners Corner–Lake Burton–Mountain City, Georgia
Meteorological history
- Formed: April 27, 2011, 10:39 p.m. EDT (UTC-05:00)
- Dissipated: April 27, 2011, 11:16 p.m. EDT (UTC-05:00)
- Duration: 37 minutes

EF3 tornado
- on the Enhanced Fujita scale
- Highest winds: 165 mph (266 km/h)

Overall effects
- Casualties: 1 fatality

This intense and long tracked EF3 tornado first touched near Turners Corner in Lumpkin County. The tornado would quickly track towards the northeast, tearing a 1.6 miles (2.6 km) long track across Lumpkin County, before moving into White County, tracking towards Whitley Gap Shelter. The tornado primarily tracked through the Chattahoochee National Forest, primarily destroying numerous trees along its path, however, it also struck multiple homes, two of which would sustain major damage, and another six would sustain minor damage. No casualties occurred in White County. The tornado would continue into Habersham County, continuing to track through secluded and forested areas north of Batesville. Numerous trees were snapped and uprooted as the tornado tracked northeast towards Goshen Mountain Rd. About eight homes along Goshen Mountain Rd sustained minor to moderate roof damage, and some snapped trees fell onto vehicles in the area. Other homes had porches completely blown away and a small cabin was destroyed.

The tornado continued into Rabun County, continuing to cause damage to areas along and near Lake Burton. Intense damage occurred near a marina on Wildcat Creek Cove, including the complete destruction of a fire department building. The tornado would then track across Moccasin Creek, where it would continue to intensify and widen to 0.5 miles (0.80 km) wide. Several lake homes were destroyed in this area. One lake home slid off its foundation and fell into Lake Burton. The tornado continued across the Moccasin Creek peninsula and over the main channel of Lake Burton. The tornado continued to cause damage to the northern shore of Timpson Cove, paralleling Meeting House Mountain Rd. Several large luxury homes were destroyed, and several others sustained major damage. One person was killed in one of the destroyed homes in this area. Numerous trees were also blown down in the Lake Burton area. The tornado began to weaken as it crossed Highway 76 northeast of Timpson Cove as it proceeded towards Black Rock Creek Park, continuing to blow down hundreds of trees. After moving through the park, the tornado began to intensify a second time, as it moved into and hit residential areas of Mountain City. A Condominium building had half of its roof blown away, and several nearby homes sustained minor to moderate roof damage. The tornado would dissipate after crossing Highway 441 north of Mountain City.

Overall, the tornado was rated EF3 with winds up to 165 mph (266 km/h), A path length extending for 33.99 miles (54.70 km), and a maximum path width of 900 yards (820 m). This tornado was the first tornado to hit Rabun County since 1983, and was the first tornado to be rated EF3/F3 in the county's history.

=== Clearwater Springs–Barnesville–Blount, Georgia ===
Clearwater Springs–Barnesville–Blount, Georgia
- The nocturnal tornado near Barnesville, Georgia.

Meteorological history
- Formed: April 28, 2011, 12:38 a.m. EDT (UTC-05:00)
- Dissipated: April 28, 2011, 1:17 a.m. EDT (UTC-05:00)
- Duration: 39 minutes

EF3 tornado
- on the Enhanced Fujita scale
- Highest winds: 140 mph (230 km/h)

Overall effects
- Casualties: 2 fatalities, 22 injuries

A house in Barnesville that was destroyed at EF3 intensity

This strong, and long tracked tornado first developed south of Clearwater Springs in Pike County near U.S. Highway 19, or 3 miles (4.8 km) south of Meansville. The tornado quickly began moving northeast through rural Pike County, knocking down several trees and power lines, before tracking into Lamar County. After entering Lamar County, the tornado would begin to rapidly intensify as it approached the town of Barnesville. West of Barnesville along Piedmont Road, three homes were completely destroyed. After entering Barnesville, the tornado would continue to destroy several homes, with many suffering minor to moderate damage. The tornado would kill two people on Grove Street when it would hit and destroy their homes. Both a Chevron Gas Station, and Church in Barnesville were also destroyed by the tornado. After tracking through Barnesville, the tornado would continue northeast while weakening, causing minor EF1 damage to forested areas on the eastern side of Lamar county.

The tornado would continue its track, and cross into Monroe County, where it would strengthen a second time, snapping Softwood Trees at EF2 intensity. After entering Monroe County, the tornado would cross Interstate-75 near mile marker 196. Along the interstate, three 18-wheel tractor-trailers were blown off the interstate. Multiple residents would sustain moderate damage from the tornado. The most major damage to residents in Monroe County occurred in Highland Falls State Park, and the community of Blount, where a home had a large section of its roof completely blown away. After passing through the southern side of Blount, the tornado began to weaken again, before crossing into Butts County, where it would continue to cause minor tree damage before dissipating.

== Non-tornadic effects ==
=== Flooding (April 25–28) ===
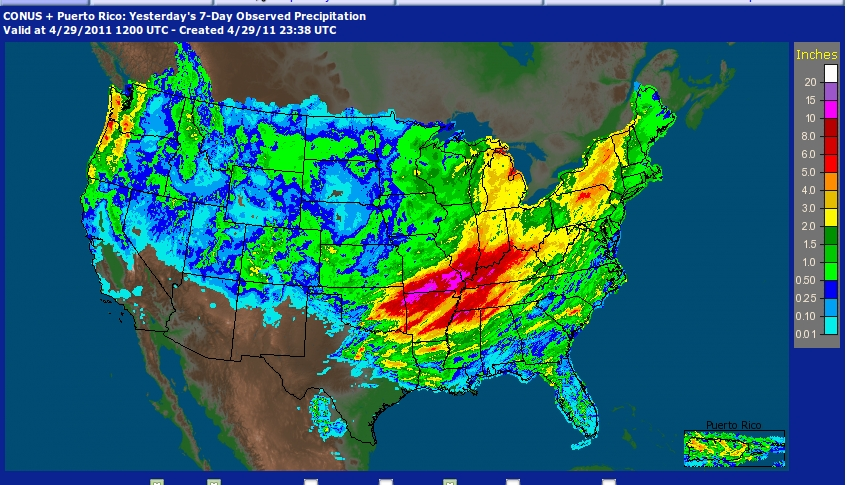
Rainfall totals within the United States for the week ending during the morning of April 29, 2011, which shows the extent of the heavy rain event this cyclone contributed towards.

This storm system prolonged an ongoing heavy rain event, which began across Arkansas and Missouri on April 22. Weekly rainfall totals reached 19.73 inches (501 mm) 6 miles (9.7 km) east-northeast of Springdale, Arkansas, 16.20 inches (411 mm) 4 miles (6.4 km) northwest of Poplar Bluff, Missouri, and 14.96 inches (380 mm) at Westville, Oklahoma. On April 25, 2011, thunderstorms with high winds swept through parts of southern and southeastern Ohio. Straight-line winds estimated at 80 miles per hour (130 km/h) uprooted trees, damaged roofs, and downed power lines through Perry County, Ohio, and Athens County, Ohio. Strong thunderstorms and heavy downpours which led to flooding were also reported in areas across Upstate New York with heavy flooding in the Syracuse area. The rain also saturated hundreds of lakes in the Adirondack Mountains. I-81 was briefly shut down in the downtown area at rush hour and the State University of New York Upstate Medical University also closed briefly due to flooding in the lobby. Heavy rains combined with rapid snowmelt caused widespread flooding across Vermont on April 26–27. Over the two-day period, up to 5 inches (130 mm) of rain fell across the northern third of Vermont, and up to 3 inches (76 mm) elsewhere across the state and extending into western Massachusetts. Numerous roads were closed across Vermont due to flooding, with some roads being completely washed out.

Farther south, flash flooding late on April 26 resulted in two fatalities in Monroe, Louisiana, after an apartment complex was swamped. The flooding there was considered to be worse than the flooding after Hurricane Gustav in 2008. In central and northern Arkansas, up to 10.44 inches (265 mm) of rain was reported during that week. The resulting flash flooding in central Arkansas also resulted in five people losing their lives. Many roads were closed due to the flooding there. The flooding was mitigated somewhat by a significant drought that had existed before the storm.

=== Other effects ===
Severe thunderstorms were reported as far north as Northern Ontario on the evening of April 26. Heavy rains and minor flooding were also reported in Northern Ontario from April 26–28. Windstorms were also reported in Southern Ontario and Southern Quebec which resulted in several injuries and one death, damages and power outages.

Other fatalities due to straight-line winds occurred early on April 26 in McComb, Mississippi and early on April 27 in Moody, Alabama, Vestavia Hills, Alabama, and Franklin, Tennessee, from the squall line with embedded tornadoes.

== Aftermath ==
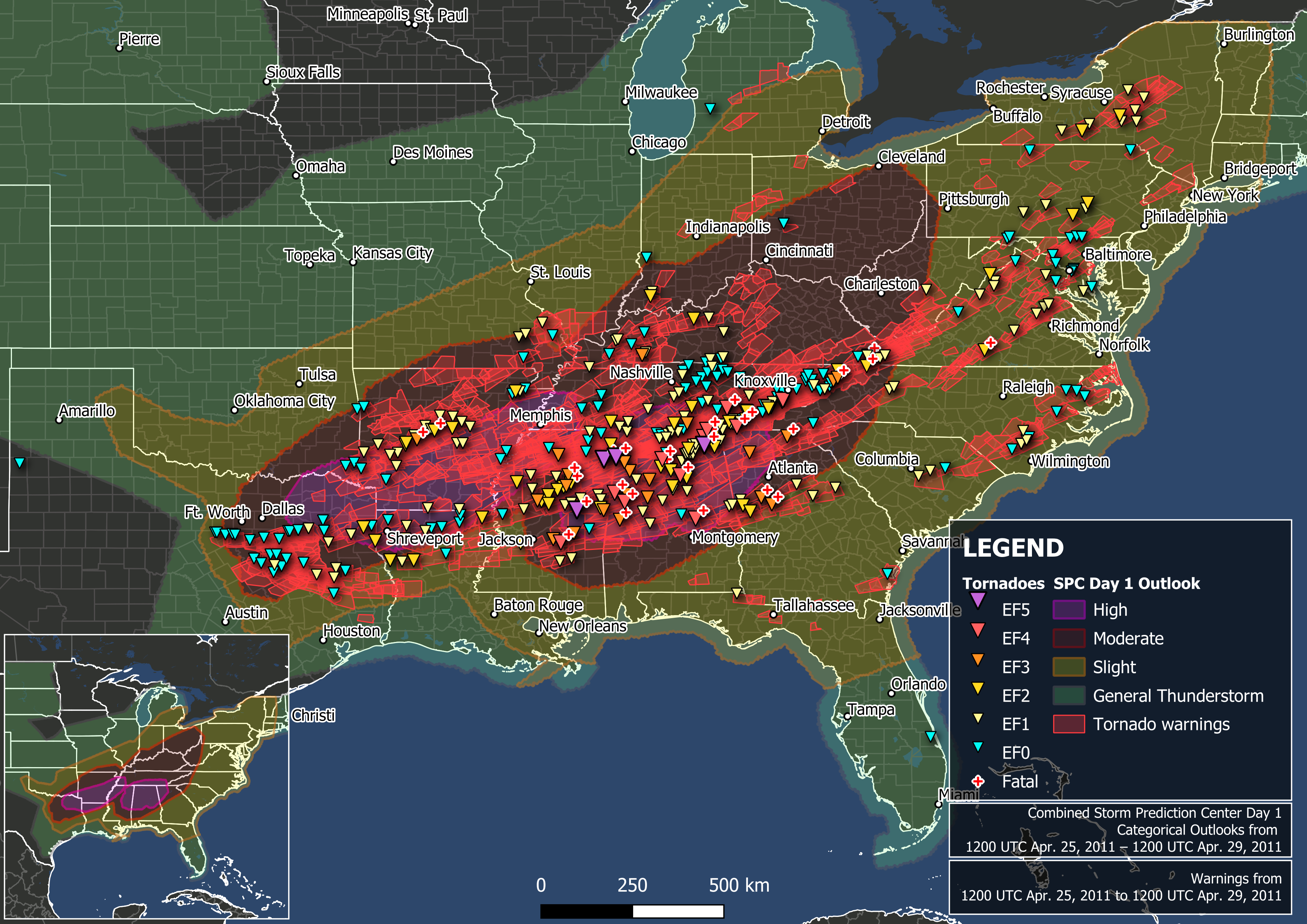
Full map of the 2011 Super Outbreak documenting the amount of tornadoes and tornado warnings issued, along with tornado deaths

=== Summary ===
With 367 confirmed tornadoes and 324 tornadic fatalities, the outbreak ranks as the largest and one of the worst in United States history. More than three dozen tornadoes were confirmed each day of the event, with 42 on April 25, 55 on April 26, a 24-hour record of 223 on April 27, and 47 on April 28. In terms of violent tornadoes, the event ranks third with 15 EF4/5 rated tornadoes, behind the 1974 Super Outbreak and 1965 Palm Sunday outbreak. The outbreak, like 1974, was named a "Super Outbreak" in the aftermath, due to the unprecedented size, intensity and devastation that this outbreak caused across the Southeastern United States.

=== Fatalities ===
Fatalities during the outbreak by U.S. state
| State | April 25 | April 26 | April 27 | April 28 | Total |
|---|---|---|---|---|---|
| Alabama | 0 | 0 | 212 | 20 | 232 |
| Arkansas | 5 | 1 | 1 | 0 | 7 |
| Georgia | 0 | 0 | 7 | 8 | 15 |
| Mississippi | 0 | 1 | 32 | 1 | 34 |
| Tennessee | 0 | 0 | 19 | 11 | 30 |
| Total | 5 | 2 | 271 | 40 | ~318 |

Although the exact number of people killed during the outbreak is a source of debate, the generally accepted number is in the 300–350 range. 271 of those deaths occurred on April 27, the date of peak activity.

The high number of fatalities on April 27 was studied in detail following the event. Despite 92 tornado warnings being issued for Alabama, 271 people were killed, many in poorly built homes. In a study of people killed during the outbreak published by the American Journal of Public Health, it was determined that only 102, or 41.3%, out of the 247 victims studied received a warning. It was determined that the majority of fatalities during the outbreak happened because of a lack of adequate community shelters in rural communities throughout Alabama.

=== Immediate recovery efforts ===
Alabama Governor Robert J. Bentley declared a state of emergency in the state of Alabama on April 27, due to storm damage from severe thunderstorms earlier that day as well as forthcoming severe weather later that day. States of emergency were also declared in Arkansas, Kentucky, Mississippi, Missouri, Tennessee, and Oklahoma because of the flooding and tornadoes. Following the tornado outbreak on the evening of April 27, President Barack Obama granted a federal emergency declaration for the state of Alabama, giving federal assistance, including search and rescue assets, to the affected region.

More than 2,000 National Guard troops were deployed to Alabama, assisting local and state first responders in search and rescue efforts. President Obama visited the affected areas of Alabama on April 29. Also on April 29, he approved a federal disaster declaration for seven Mississippi counties: Clarke, Greene, Hinds, Jasper, Kemper, Lafayette, and Monroe.

=== Electricity outage ===
Storms through the area severely damaged Tennessee Valley Authority (TVA)'s power grid for transmitting electricity throughout the region. More than 300 power transmission towers, 120 to 150 feet (37 to 46 m) tall, were destroyed in the storms, some "twisted like bow ties" according to National Weather Service meteorologist Eric Holweg. The towers supported some 90 transmission lines, a mixture of 500kV and 161kV lines. Those lines provided power from TVA to 128 regional distributors.

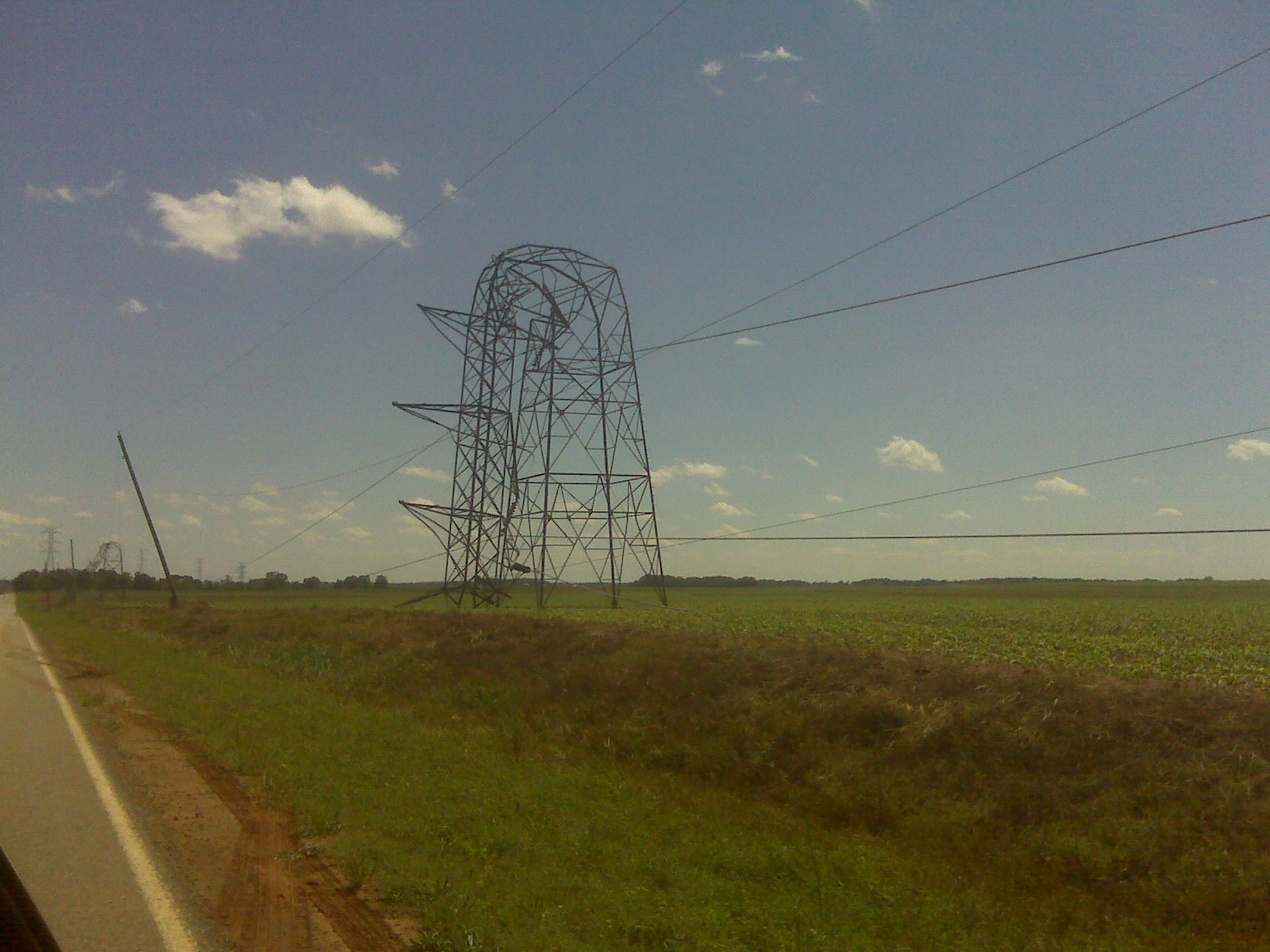
Transmission tower bent near Huntsville, Alabama.

TVA lost the ability to transmit power from both Browns Ferry Nuclear Power Plant and Widows Creek Fossil Plant after the storms on April 27, requiring both to be shut down. The nuclear plant's cold shutdown was supported by diesel generators for four days until a second 161kV line could be restored to the plant. The loss of redundant off-site power required a "notification of unusual event", the lowest of four levels of concern dictated by the NRC. Some 60 percent of the sirens for warning residents of worse problems around Browns Ferry were disabled by the storms, and the plant had to arrange plans to use cars with loudspeakers to warn residents in case of another problem. The Nuclear Regulatory Commission stated at a press conference: "The plants' conditions are stable and are being placed in a cooled-down condition."

Huntsville was the largest city with no electricity from TVA. All the traffic lights were off, a dusk-to-dawn curfew was imposed, students were sent home from United States Space Camp, and the Panoply Arts Festival was canceled. Power was restored gradually to Huntsville, beginning with 3 percent on the morning of May 1. Only localized outages remained eight days after the storm. In addition to traffic and safety issues, the outage caused difficulties with water treatment and distribution and retail of all kinds, including gasoline and food purchases.

Ontario electricity outages were minor, mostly caused by the windstorms of April 28. Although they affected thousands of people at different times throughout the day, all power was restored by the end of the day.

== See also ==
- Tornadoes of 2011
- Weather of 2011
- List of North American tornadoes and tornado outbreaks
- List of F5 and EF5 tornadoes
- List of F4 and EF4 tornadoes
- List of disasters in the United States by death toll
- Tornado records
- List of notable media in the field of meteorology
