= Tuscaloosa County, Alabama =

County in Alabama, United States

- County
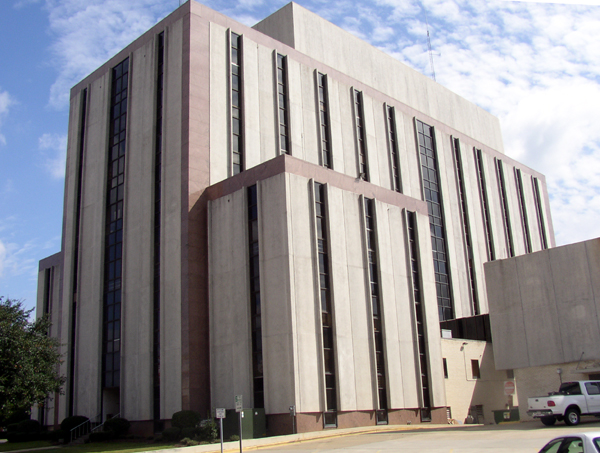
- Tuscaloosa County Courthouse in Tuscaloosa

- Seal

- Location within the U.S. state of Alabama
- Coordinates: 33°12′23″N 87°32′05″W
- Country: United States
- State: Alabama
- Founded: February 6, 1818
- Named for: Tuskaloosa
- Seat: Tuscaloosa
- Largest city: Tuscaloosa

Area
  - Total: 1,351 sq mi (3,500 km^{2})
  - Land: 1,322 sq mi (3,420 km^{2})
  - Water: 30 sq mi (78 km^{2}) 2.2%

Population (2020)
  - Total: 227,036
  - Estimate (2025): 241,368 ▲
  - Density: 171.7/sq mi (66.31/km^{2})
- Time zone: UTC−6 (Central)
  - Summer (DST): UTC−5 (CDT)
- Congressional districts: 4th, 7th
- Website: www.tuscco.com
- County Number 63 on Alabama License Plates; Largest County by population not shuffled to top 05 on Alabama License Plates

Tuscaloosa County is a county in the northwest-central portion of the U.S. state of Alabama and is the center of commerce, education, industry, health care, and entertainment for the region.

As of the 2020 census, its population was 227,036, making it the fifth-most populous county in Alabama. The county seat and largest city is Tuscaloosa. Tuscaloosa County is part of the Tuscaloosa, AL Metropolitan Statistical Area, which also includes Hale and Pickens counties. The community gained international attention in 1993 when it landed Mercedes-Benz's first North American assembly plant, and as of 2021, the company employs over 4,000 people at the facility. Even so, Tier-1 research university the University of Alabama remains the county's largest employer and dominant economic and cultural engine.

== History ==
See also the history of Tuscaloosa, Alabama

=== Early settlement ===
The pace of white settlement in the Southeast increased greatly after the War of 1812 and the Treaty of Fort Jackson and the subsequent availability of land previously settled by Native Americans. A small assortment of log cabins soon arose near the large Creek village at the fall line of the river, which the new settlers named in honor of the sixteenth-century Chief Tuskaloosa. of a Muskogean-speaking tribe and paramount chief of the Mississippian culture. To form the word, they combined the Choctaw words "tushka" or "tashka" ("warrior") and "lusa" ("black").

In 1817, Alabama became a territory. Tuscaloosa County was established on February 6, 1818. On December 13, 1819, the territorial legislature incorporated the town of Tuskaloosa- now Tuscaloosa - one day before Congress admitted Alabama the Union as a state.

From 1826 to 1846, Tuskaloosa was the capital of Alabama. The State House was built at the corner of 6th Street and 28th Avenue (now the site of Capitol Park). In 1831, the University of Alabama was established.

=== Civil War and Reconstruction ===
During the antebellum years, the principal crop was cotton, cultivated and processed by African-American slaves. By 1860, shortly before Alabama's secession from the Union, the county had a total of 12,971 whites, 84 free African-Americans, and 10,145 African-American slaves; the latter comprised 43.7 percent of the total population. The Civil War brought significant changes, including migration out of the county by some African Americans. Some freedmen moved to nearby counties and larger cities for more opportunities and to join with other freedmen in communities less subject to white supervision and intimidation.

Several thousand men from Tuscaloosa County fought in the Confederate armies. During the last weeks of the War, a brigade of Union troops raiding the city burned the campus of the university. The town of Tuscaloosa was also damaged in the battle and shared fully in the South's economic sufferings which followed the defeat. Following Reconstruction, there was violence as whites struggled to regain control of the state legislature. It reached a height in the late 19th and early 20th centuries. Tuscaloosa County had a total of 10 documented lynchings of African Americans, according to a 2015 study by the Equal Justice Initiative.

In the 1890s the construction of a system of locks and dams on the Black Warrior River by the U.S. Army Corps of Engineers improved navigation to such an extent that Tuscaloosa was effectively connected to the Gulf Coast seaport of Mobile. This stimulated the economy and trade, and mining and metallurgical industries were developed in the region. By the advent of the 20th century, the growth of the University of Alabama and the mental health-care facilities in the city, along with a strong national economy, fueled a steady growth in Tuscaloosa which continued unabated for 100 years.

In 1901, the state legislature passed a constitution that disenfranchised most African Americans and tens of thousands of poor whites and followed with Jim Crow laws enforcing racial segregation. Due to this oppression and problems of continued violence by lynchings, many African Americans left Alabama in two waves of the Great Migration in the first half of the 20th century. They went to Northern and Midwestern industrial cities. Their mass departure from Tuscaloosa County is reflected in the lower rates of county population growth from 1910 to 1930, and from 1950 to 1970. (see Census Table).

=== Civil Rights era ===
Blacks by 1960 represented 28.7% of the county population, and they were still disenfranchised throughout the state. African Americans in Tuscaloosa were active in demonstrations and other civil rights activities throughout the 1960s, seeking desegregation of public facilities, including the county courthouse. The university was at the center of significant moments in the civil rights movement, including the admission of Autherine Lucy and the pro-segregation demonstration that followed as well as the Stand in the Schoolhouse Door incident in which then-governor George Wallace attempted to stop desegregation of the institution by denying entrance to two African-American students.

The late 20th century brought positive economic news when Mercedes-Benz announced it would build its first U.S. assembly plant near Vance. The facility opened in 1995 and began assembling the R-Class Grand Sport Tourer in 2005. From 2006 to 2015 it produced the GL-Class vehicles; and since 1998 and 2015 respectively, has produced the GLS-Class and GLE-CLASS. The plant brought thousands of jobs to the area through its own direct hires as well as those of the many component suppliers it attracted.

=== 2000 to Present ===
On April 27, 2011, the city of Tuscaloosa was hit by a half-mile (800 m) wide EF4 tornado, which was part of the 2011 Super Outbreak. It resulted in at least 44 deaths in the city, over 1000 injuries, and massive devastation. Officials at DCH Hospital (alone) in Tuscaloosa reported treating more than 1000 injured people in the first several days of the tornado aftermath. Mayor Maddox was quoted saying that "We have neighborhoods that have been basically removed from the map." On April 29, President Barack Obama, upon touring the tornado damage in Tuscaloosa, said "I have never seen devastation like this".

In the decade since, more than $1 billion in public and private funding has assisted the community in recovery. Former Tuscaloosa City Council President told NPR in 2021, "Black, white, young and old come together and we worked through this thing and made Tuscaloosa what it is today."

According to a police violence tracking website, police have killed directly or indirectly 18 people over the last 21 years in the county, half of them African American.

== Geography ==
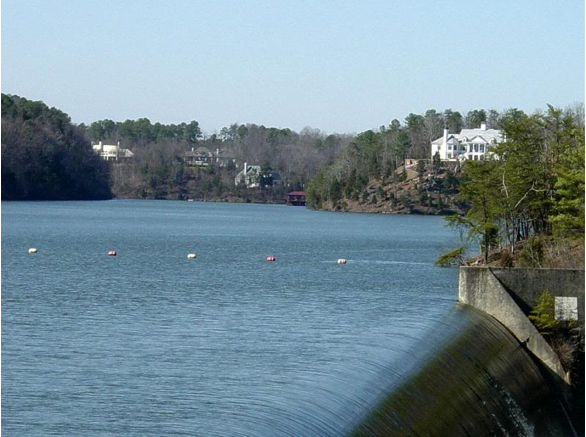
Lake Tuscaloosa

According to the United States Census Bureau, the county has a total area of 1,351 square miles (3,500 km^{2}), of which 1,322 square miles (3,420 km^{2}) is land and 30 square miles (78 km^{2}) (2.2%) is water. It is the second-largest county in Alabama by land area and third-largest by total area. It is located in the west central part of the state, in the region commonly known as West Alabama. The county straddles the boundary between the Appalachian Highlands and the Gulf Coastal Plain and consequently boasts a diverse geography. Tuscaloosa County contains part of the Talladega National Forest, a national protected area.

Adjacent counties are: Walker County (northeast), Jefferson County (east), Bibb County (southeast), Hale County (south), Greene County (southwest), Pickens County (west), and Fayette County (northwest)

== Demographics ==
Historical population
Census	Pop.	Note	%±
1820	8,229		—
1830	13,646		65.8%
1840	16,583		21.5%
1850	18,056		8.9%
1860	23,200		28.5%
1870	20,081		−13.4%
1880	24,957		24.3%
1890	30,352		21.6%
1900	36,147		19.1%
1910	47,559		31.6%
1920	53,680		12.9%
1930	64,153		19.5%
1940	76,036		18.5%
1950	94,092		23.7%
1960	109,047		15.9%
1970	116,029		6.4%
1980	137,541		18.5%
1990	150,522		9.4%
2000	164,875		9.5%
2010	194,656		18.1%
2020	227,036		16.6%
2025 (est.)	241,368	▲	6.3%
U.S. Decennial Census; 2010 2020; 1790–1960 1900–1990; 1990–2000 2010 2020

=== Racial and ethnic composition ===
Tuscaloosa County, Alabama – Racial and ethnic composition Note: the US Census treats Hispanic/Latino as an ethnic category. This table excludes Latinos from the racial categories and assigns them to a separate category. Hispanics/Latinos may be of any race.
Race / Ethnicity (NH = Non-Hispanic)	Pop 2000	Pop 2010	Pop 2020	% 2000	% 2010	% 2020
White alone (NH)	111,367	126,611	134,880	67.55%	65.04%	59.41%
Black or African American alone (NH)	48,135	57,401	68,779	29.19%	29.49%	30.29%
Native American or Alaska Native alone (NH)	348	455	420	0.21%	0.23%	0.18%
Asian alone (NH)	1,506	2,293	3,241	0.91%	1.18%	1.43%
Pacific Islander alone (NH)	19	76	94	0.01%	0.04%	0.04%
Other race alone (NH)	107	136	792	0.06%	0.07%	0.35%
Mixed race or Multiracial (NH)	1,263	1,735	6,532	0.77%	0.89%	2.88%
Hispanic or Latino (any race)	2,130	5,949	12,298	1.29%	3.06%	5.42%
Total	164,875	194,656	227,036	100.00%	100.00%	100.00%

=== 2020 census ===
As of the 2020 census, the county had a population of 227,036. The median age was 32.9 years. 21.1% of residents were under the age of 18 and 13.7% of residents were 65 years of age or older. For every 100 females there were 91.9 males, and for every 100 females age 18 and over there were 89.5 males age 18 and over.

The racial makeup of the county was 60.2% White, 30.4% Black or African American, 0.4% American Indian and Alaska Native, 1.4% Asian, 0.0% Native Hawaiian and Pacific Islander, 2.8% from some other race, and 4.7% from two or more races. Hispanic or Latino residents of any race comprised 5.4% of the population.

68.9% of residents lived in urban areas, while 31.1% lived in rural areas.

There were 89,962 households in the county, of which 28.8% had children under the age of 18 living with them and 33.5% had a female householder with no spouse or partner present. About 31.6% of all households were made up of individuals and 9.3% had someone living alone who was 65 years of age or older.

There were 101,460 housing units, of which 11.3% were vacant. Among occupied housing units, 58.9% were owner-occupied and 41.1% were renter-occupied. The homeowner vacancy rate was 1.9% and the rental vacancy rate was 11.6%.

=== 2010 census ===
As of the 2010 census, there were 194,656 people, 76,141 households, and 46,304 families residing in the county. The population density was 147 persons per square mile (57 persons/km^{2}). There were 84,872 housing units at an average density of 64 units per square mile (25 units/km^{2}). The racial makeup of the county was 66.3% White, 29.6% Black or African American, 0.3% Native American, 1.2% Asian, 0.1% Pacific Islander, 1.5% from other races, and 1.1% from two or more races. Nearly 3.1% of the population were Hispanic or Latino of any race.

There were 76,141 households, out of which 26.4% had children under the age of 18 living with them; 41.6% were married couples living together, 14.9% had a female householder with no husband present, and 39.2% were non-families. 29.2% of all households were made up of individuals, and 7.7% had someone living alone who was 65 years of age or older. The average household size was 2.42, and the average family size was 3.02.

In the county, 21.5% of the population was under the age of 18, 19.7% was from 18 to 24, 25.2% from 25 to 44, 22.9% from 45 to 64, and 10.8% was 65 years of age or older. The median age was 31.2 years. For every 100 females, there were 94.2 males. For every 100 females age 18 and over, there were 95.3 males.

The median income for a household in the county was $42,311, and the median income for a family was $58,756. Males had a median income of $42,424 versus $32,163 for females. The per capita income for the county was $22,546. About 11.3% of families and 19.7% of the population were below the poverty line, including 22.4% of those under age 18 and 10.1% of those age 65 or over.

=== 2000 census ===
As of the 2000 census, there were 164,875 people, 64,517 households, and 41,677 families residing in the county. The population density was 124 persons per square mile (48 persons/km^{2}). The population core of the county lies in Tuscaloosa-Northport conurbation (including Coaling, Coker, and Holt CDP). The combined 2000 Census population of this area (not including their undesignated suburban census areas) is 103,367, accounting for 62.7% of the county in population, while only accounting for 6.9% in area. Consequently, the population density of the central population core is 1,137 persons per square mile (439 persons/km^{2}), while the density of the county outside the central population core is only 44 persons per square mile (17 persons/km^{2}).

There were 71,429 housing units at an average density of 54 units per square mile (21 units/km^{2}). The racial makeup of the county was 68.12% White, 29.31% Black or African American, 0.23% Native American, 0.92% Asian, 0.03% Pacific Islander, 0.56% from other races, and 0.82% from two or more races. Nearly 1.29% of the population were Hispanic or Latino of any race.

According to the 2000 census the largest ancestry groups in Tuscaloosa County were: 31.2% English, 29.31% African, 8.9% Irish, 7% German, 2.9% Scots-Irish and 2% Scottish.

There were 64,517 households, out of which 30.30% had children under the age of 18 living with them; 47.20% were married couples living together, 14.00% had a female householder with no husband present, and 35.40% were non-families. 28.40% of all households were made up of individuals, and 8.30% had someone living alone who was 65 years of age or older. The average household size was 2.42, and the average family size was 3.00.

In the county, 23.40% of the population was under the age of 18, 16.50% was from 18 to 24, 28.10% from 25 to 44, 20.80% from 45 to 64, and 11.30% was 65 years of age or older. The median age was 32 years. For every 100 females, there were 92.80 males. For every 100 females age 18 and over, there were 89.50 males.

The median income for a household in the county was $34,436, and the median income for a family was $45,485. Males had a median income of $34,807 versus $24,128 for females. The per capita income for the county was $18,998. About 11.30% of families and 17.00% of the population were below the poverty line, including 19.50% of those under age 18 and 13.20% of those age 65 or over.

== Culture ==
=== Housing ===
Tuscaloosa County has an overall cost of living that is 12% lower than the national average. The average housing value as of May 2021 was $182,303. Between 2020 and 2021, the Tuscaloosa County Economic Development Authority reported a 31.2% increase in housing sales.

=== Recreation ===
Located in the Appalachian foothills, Tuscaloosa has 177 miles of shoreline for recreational use along its waterways. The county has 35 parks, containing nearly 2,000 acres. Outdoor recreation areas include the 5000-acre Lake Tuscaloosa, Hurricane Creek, and the 250-acre Lake Lurleen in Lake Lurleen State Park.

The University of Alabama Arboretum explores Tuscaloosa's native flora and fauna.

=== Entertainment ===
Tuscaloosa's downtown entertainment district contains several music venues, including Tuscaloosa Amphitheater, which regularly hosts live music performances. The 1938 Bama Theatre, which has a historic train trestle, is also an events venue. Every Friday evening during the summer, the City of Tuscaloosa holds a free live concert series, Live at the Plaza.

=== River market ===
The Tuscaloosa River Market hosts two weekly farmers markets and is open year-round, although only the Saturday market is open year-round.

=== Museums & The Arts ===
Historical museums in Tuscaloosa County include the Alabama Museum of Natural History, The Mildred Westervelt Warner Transportation Museum, and the Paul W. Bryant Museum, which celebrates The University of Alabama's athletics history. There is also The Children's Hands on Museum (CHOM) which showcases the history of Tuscaloosa County.

Kentuck Art Center in historic downtown Northport represents approximately 180 artists from around the country, 60% of whom are local to Alabama. The center also hosts an annual Kentuck Festival of the Arts, which has a yearly attendance of 10,000-20,000.

=== College Sports ===
Football games in Tuscaloosa make a $25.8 million per-game impact. The University of Alabama has 21 varsity SEC teams, including Crimson Tide Football. Alabama teams have achieved 18 recognised national championships, and the Bryant-Denny Stadium, with a capacity of 100,077, is one of the world's largest on-campus football stadiums.

=== Sports Leagues & Wellness ===
Tuscaloosa County Parks and Recreation Authority (PARA) operates seven activity centers that have facilities for basketball, swimming, workouts, and other recreation. PARA also operates youth sports leagues, as does the YMCA. For tennis, there are two country clubs as well as a public facility. The county is also home to many public and private golf courses.

== Economy ==
=== Major Employers ===
Tuscaloosa County's largest employers represent education institutions, quality health-care providers, and enterprises focused on advanced manufacturing for the automotive and other industries. The county's 20 largest employers are: The University of Alabama, Mercedes Benz U.S. International, DCH Regional Medical Center, Tuscaloosa County Board of Education, City of Tuscaloosa Board of Education, Warrior Met Coal, Inc., The City of Tuscaloosa, Michelin/BF Goodrich Tire Manufacturing, Veterans Administration Medical Center, SMP Automotive Systems, Phifer Incorporated, Brose Tuscaloosa, Northport Medical Center, ARD Logistics, Shelton State Community College, Bryce Hospital, Tuscaloosa County, Nucor Tuscaloosa, ZF Chassis Systems Tuscaloosa Axel Systems, and the Alabama Department of Transportation.

=== Workforce ===
Tuscaloosa County has a total labor force of approximately 100,220 that includes many recent graduates of local higher education institutions.

The county partners with West AlabamaWorks, a workforce development organization that connects government, education, and private sector partners throughout a nine-county region. The county also works closely with statewide workforce development resources including Alabama Industrial Development Training (AIDT) and Alabama Technology Network. AIDT is a nationally renowned state agency that provides no-cost career technical program enhancements at the state's community and technical colleges, customizing services to benefit employers and trainees. Alabama Technology Network, part of the Alabama Community College System, is ISO 9001:2008 Certified and connects industry leaders with government and education resources to provide workforce training, technical assistance, and engineering services to existing workers in the following areas:

Tuscaloosa City Schools and the Tuscaloosa County School District both offer technical and career education as part of their standard curriculum. Tuscaloosa Career & Technology Academy, part of Tuscaloosa City Schools, offers instruction in 17 career pathways at its $23-million facility. The Bill Taylor Institute, a collaboration between Mercedes-Benz U.S. International, Inc. and AIDT, offers high school and community apprenticeship courses.

=== Emerging Industries ===
Capitalizing on access to research and development resources of its higher education institutions along with a large workforce, the Tuscaloosa County Economic Development Authority recently identified six target industries for future economic growth and expansion: Research & Development, Healthcare, Corporate Operations, Advanced Manufacturing, Information Technology, and Energy.

== Education ==
=== Higher Education ===
The county is the home to Tier-1 research university The University of Alabama, Shelton State Community College, and private liberal arts school Stillman College, a historically black college founded in 1876. Together, the three schools enroll 43,681 students as of spring 2021.

=== Primary and secondary Education ===
The Tuscaloosa County School System serves students in the county who live outside the city limits of Tuscaloosa. The system has been in operation since 1871. The system is managed by a board of education, composed of 7 members elected by single-member districts by the voters of the county outside the limits of the city of Tuscaloosa. The board appoints a superintendent to manage the day-to-day operations of the system. In school year 2020–21, over 18,700 students (ALSDE Report Card) were enrolled by the system. There are 19 elementary schools, 2 intermediate schools, 7 middle schools and 6 high schools. Children are also served at the Tuscaloosa Regional Detention Center and Sprayberry Regional Educational Center; the latter provides services to at risk, and special needs children. The six county high schools are Brookwood High School (Brookwood), Hillcrest High School (Taylorville), Holt (Holt), Northside (Samantha), Sipsey Valley (Coker), and Tuscaloosa County High School (Northport).

The Tuscaloosa City School System serves students who live in the city of Tuscaloosa. There are approximately 10,000 students enrolled in Tuscaloosa City Schools. Twenty-four schools comprise the district, including 13 elementary schools, 6 middle schools, 3 high schools and 3 campuses dedicated to specialty education: one for students with special needs and those receiving alternative education, a school for students studying performing arts, and a career technical facility for grades 9 – 12. The three high schools are Paul W. Bryant High School, Central High School, and Northridge High School.

== Government and politics ==
United States presidential election results for Tuscaloosa County, Alabama
Year	Republican		Democratic		Third party(ies)	
Year	No.	%	No.	%	No.	%
1824	186	27.11%	382	55.69%	118	17.20%
1828	154	19.47%	637	80.53%	0	0.00%
1832	0	0.00%	428	100.00%	0	0.00%
1836	730	46.47%	841	53.53%	0	0.00%
1840	1,276	57.63%	938	42.37%	0	0.00%
1844	902	48.34%	964	51.66%	0	0.00%
1848	976	58.44%	694	41.56%	0	0.00%
1852	527	52.44%	475	47.26%	3	0.30%
1856	0	0.00%	680	41.14%	973	58.86%
1860	0	0.00%	23	1.02%	2,242	98.98%
1868	1,167	45.76%	1,383	54.24%	0	0.00%
1872	1,363	45.22%	1,651	54.78%	0	0.00%
1876	988	31.15%	2,184	68.85%	0	0.00%
1880	807	30.32%	1,855	69.68%	0	0.00%
1884	807	31.04%	1,776	68.31%	17	0.65%
1888	1,057	32.03%	2,214	67.09%	29	0.88%
1892	708	16.60%	2,212	51.85%	1,346	31.55%
1896	965	29.73%	2,151	66.27%	130	4.00%
1900	650	34.37%	1,173	62.03%	68	3.60%
1904	132	8.29%	1,405	88.20%	56	3.52%
1908	162	7.97%	1,729	85.05%	142	6.98%
1912	87	4.37%	1,695	85.22%	207	10.41%
1916	218	8.05%	2,437	89.99%	53	1.96%
1920	491	12.41%	3,438	86.91%	27	0.68%
1924	247	8.97%	2,363	85.80%	144	5.23%
1928	1,210	30.39%	2,769	69.56%	2	0.05%
1932	302	5.34%	5,322	94.09%	32	0.57%
1936	332	5.19%	6,029	94.31%	32	0.50%
1940	426	6.33%	6,284	93.35%	22	0.33%
1944	584	10.48%	4,939	88.62%	50	0.90%
1948	658	12.06%	0	0.00%	4,797	87.94%
1952	3,872	33.04%	7,677	65.50%	171	1.46%
1956	4,994	36.19%	8,186	59.33%	618	4.48%
1960	5,598	40.01%	8,254	58.99%	140	1.00%
1964	13,227	68.67%	0	0.00%	6,036	31.33%
1968	3,822	13.47%	5,556	19.58%	18,993	66.95%
1972	21,172	70.15%	8,272	27.41%	735	2.44%
1976	16,021	43.29%	20,275	54.79%	710	1.92%
1980	19,750	48.50%	19,103	46.91%	1,867	4.58%
1984	28,075	62.75%	16,066	35.91%	598	1.34%
1988	27,396	59.87%	18,166	39.70%	196	0.43%
1992	27,454	47.27%	23,495	40.46%	7,124	12.27%
1996	27,939	51.38%	23,067	42.42%	3,376	6.21%
2000	34,003	56.56%	24,614	40.95%	1,497	2.49%
2004	42,877	61.40%	26,447	37.87%	506	0.72%
2008	45,405	57.54%	32,796	41.56%	711	0.90%
2012	45,748	58.08%	32,048	40.68%	976	1.24%
2016	47,723	57.71%	31,762	38.41%	3,215	3.89%
2020	51,117	56.69%	37,765	41.88%	1,290	1.43%
2024	50,724	59.50%	33,399	39.17%	1,133	1.33%

United States Senate election results for Tuscaloosa County, Alabama2
Year	Republican		Democratic		Third party(ies)	
Year	No.	%	No.	%	No.	%
2020	49,347	54.87%	40,404	44.92%	190	0.21%

United States Senate election results for Tuscaloosa County, Alabama3
Year	Republican		Democratic		Third party(ies)	
Year	No.	%	No.	%	No.	%
2022	31,879	61.75%	18,591	36.01%	1,156	2.24%

Alabama Gubernatorial election results for Tuscaloosa County
Year	Republican		Democratic		Third party(ies)	
Year	No.	%	No.	%	No.	%
2022	31,841	61.71%	17,937	34.76%	1,821	3.53%

Tuscaloosa County is somewhat conservative for a county dominated by a college town. While most such counties have swung toward the Democrats since the 1990s, Tuscaloosa County has not voted for a Democratic presidential candidate since 1976, the only time it has gone Democratic since 1960. For example, Tuscaloosa County voted for John McCain over Barack Obama in the 2008 election by a margin of 58-42%.

In 2018 Alabama gubernatorial election, Democratic candidate Walt Maddox, the mayor of the city of Tuscaloosa, won the county by a mere one vote over incumbent Republican Kay Ivey, who won the election.

Tuscaloosa County is one of seven in the state with limited home rule. It must still gain state legislative approval on many issues, including for financial measures. The four-member County Commission is elected from single-member districts.

Judges are also elected. The current District Court Judges are:

- Judge Joanne Jannik
- Judge Jim Gentry

The current Circuit Court Judges in no particular order are:

- Judge Allen W. May, Jr., Presiding Judge
- Judge M. Bradley Almond
- Judge Daniel F. Pruet
- Judge James H. Roberts, Jr.
- Judge Elizabeth C. Hamner

The current Clerk of the Circuit Court is Magaria H. Bobo.

The current County Sheriff is Ron Abernathy. The chief law enforcement officer of Tuscaloosa County, which comprises the Sixth Judicial Circuit, is Hays Webb, District Attorney, also an elected position.

At the federal level, Tuscaloosa County is divided between the fourth and seventh congressional districts of Alabama, represented by Robert Aderholt (R) and Terri Sewell (D), respectively. The 7th district includes much of the Black Belt and is a majority-minority district, with a predominantly African-American majority.

Tuscaloosa County is within the northern federal court district of Alabama.

== Transportation ==
=== Major highways ===
- I-20 / I-59
- I-359
- US 11 / SR 7 (unsigned)
- US 43 / SR 13 (unsigned)
- US 82 / SR 6 (unsigned)
- SR 5
- SR 69
- SR 171
- SR 215
- SR 216
- SR 297
- SR 300 (unsigned)

=== Toll Roads/Bridges ===
Road Name	S/W Terminus	N/E Terminus	Length	Cash tolls (automobile)	Notes
Black Warrior Parkway	Tuscaloosa	Northport	4.9 mi.	$1.50	

=== Transit ===
- Amtrak Crescent (Tuscaloosa station)
- Tuscaloosa Transit Authority

=== Rail ===
- Freight: Class 1 Railroads CPKC ex Kansas City Southern and Norfolk Southern Railway
- Intermodal Freight: Norfolk Southern's Birmingham Regional Intermodal Facility just across the county line in McCalla
- Passenger Service: The county is served by Amtrak's Crescent at Tuscaloosa station.

=== Airports & Cargo Facilities ===
- Tuscaloosa National Airport
- Birmingham-Shuttlesworth International Airport

=== Waterway Access ===
The Black Warrior River bisects Tuscaloosa County and is part of Alabama's network of more than 1,300 miles of navigable waterways (the largest inland waterway system in the U.S.).

The Alabama State Port Authority (ASPA) owns and operates the State of Alabama's deepwater port facilities at the Port of Mobile, located approximately 225 highway miles from Tuscaloosa.

ASPA also operates the Tuscaloosa-Northport Inland Dock in Tuscaloosa County, which features a 60’ by 80’ concrete barge dock, mooring dolphins, a 24,000-square-foot warehouse and a 570,000 bushel grain elevator. Private docking facilities are also available in the county.

Parker Towing Company, with headquarters in Tuscaloosa, provides regional and local barge service and has one of the largest barge lines in the Southeast.

== Communities ==
=== Cities ===
- Brookwood
- Northport
- Tuscaloosa (county seat)

=== Towns ===
- Coaling
- Coker
- Lake View
- Moundville (partly in Hale County)
- Vance (partly in Bibb County)
- Woodstock (partly in Bibb County)

=== Census-designated places ===
- Cottondale
- Holt

=== Other unincorporated communities ===
- Abernant
- Buhl
- Caffee Junction
- Duncanville
- Echola
- Elrod
- Fosters
- Gorgas (partly in Walker County)
- Kellerman
- Kimbrell (partly in Jefferson County)
- McCalla (partly in Jefferson County)
- Moores Bridge
- New Lexington
- Peterson
- Ralph
- Romulus
- Samantha
- Sandtown
- Tannehill
- Taylorville
- Windham Springs

=== Ghost towns ===
- Brownville
- Kaulton

== See also ==
- National Register of Historic Places listings in Tuscaloosa County, Alabama
- Properties on the Alabama Register of Landmarks and Heritage in Tuscaloosa County, Alabama
