= Lawrence Wilson =

American gridiron football player (born 1987)

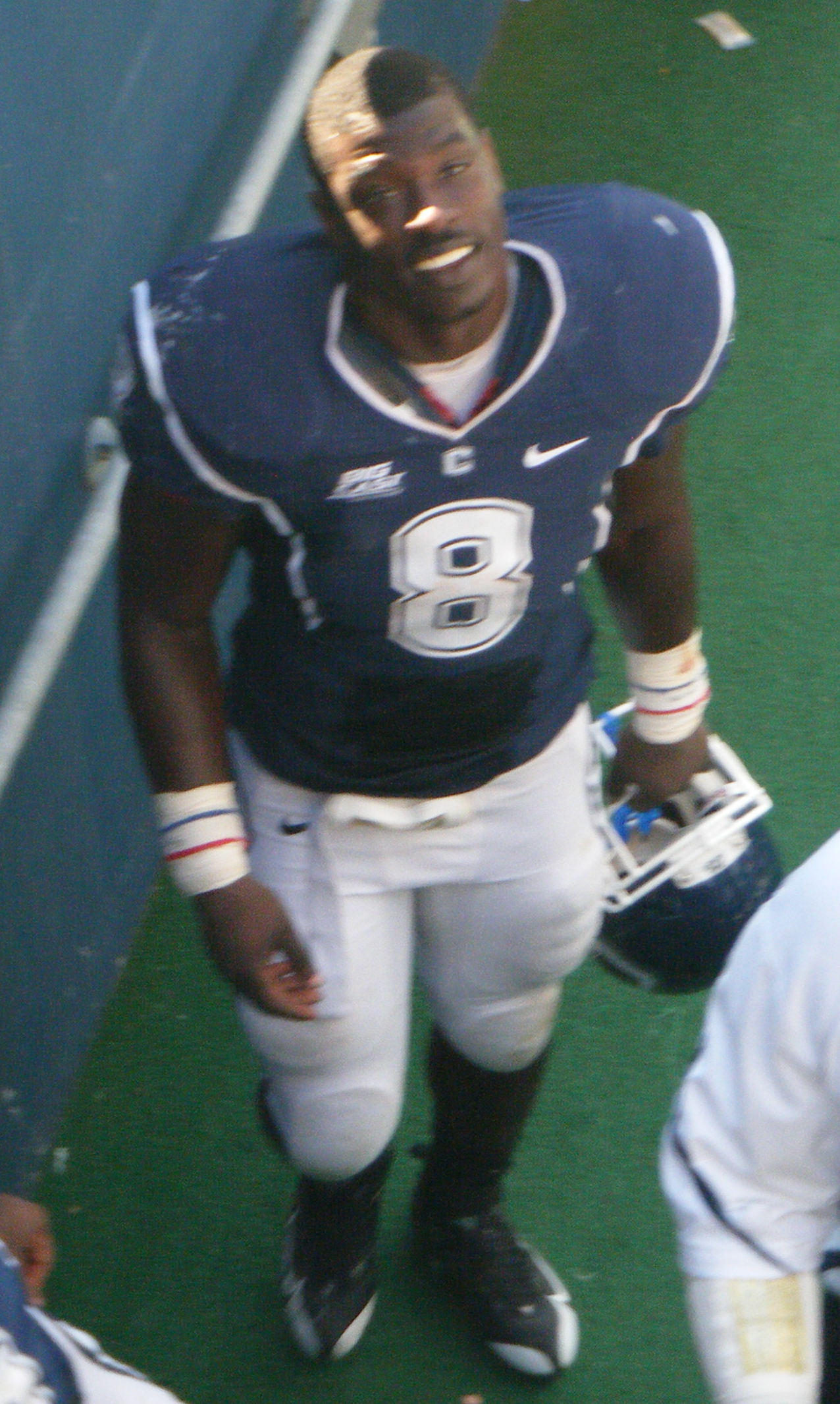
- Wilson with the UConn Huskies in 2010

Profile
- Position: Linebacker

Personal information
- Born: November 16, 1987 (age 38); Santa Maria, California, U.S.
- Listed height: 6 ft 1 in (1.85 m)
- Listed weight: 229 lb (104 kg)

Career information
- High school: Paul W. Bryant (Tuscaloosa, Alabama)
- College: Connecticut
- NFL draft: 2011: 6th round, 166th overall pick

Career history
- Carolina Panthers (2011)*; Tennessee Titans (2012)*; New Orleans Saints (2012)*; Chicago Bears (2013)*; Toronto Argonauts (2013)*; Chicago Bears (2013–2014)*; St. Louis Rams (2014)*
- * Offseason or practice squad member only

Awards and highlights
- Second-team Freshman All-American (2007); 2× First-team All-Big East (2009, 2010)
- Stats at Pro Football Reference

Lawrence Jamel Wilson (born November 16, 1987) is an American former football linebacker. In both his junior and senior seasons, he led the Big East in tackles and was selected to the All-Big East First-team. He finished his collegiate career second in tackles all-time at UConn. Lawrence was selected in the sixth round of the 2011 NFL draft at pick number 166 by the Carolina Panthers.

He was also a member of the Tennessee Titans, New Orleans Saints, Chicago Bears, Toronto Argonauts and St. Louis Rams.

== Early life ==
Despite playing high school football in Tuscaloosa, Alabama at Paul W. Bryant High School, Wilson received only one scholarship offer; from the University of Connecticut, partially because his father lived in the state. He committed to play football for the Huskies on January 16, 2006.

== College career ==
After red shirting during his freshman season at Connecticut, Wilson began his playing career as the starting weakside linebacker in 2007, due to an injury to incumbent starter, Ryan Henegan. He would start all 13 games and set a freshman UConn record with 113 tackles. His sophomore season was highlighted by a game winning interception returned for a touchdown against Louisville. He would earn Big East Defensive Player of the Week honors for his performance in that game.
Wilson led the Big East in tackles and was named to the All-Big East First-team during both his junior and senior seasons. He scored his third career touchdown off of a tipped pass against South Florida. It was the only touchdown the Huskies scored in the victory, and helped them clinch their first trip to a BCS bowl game.

== Professional career ==
Pre-draft measurables
Height	Weight	Arm length	Hand span	Wingspan	40-yard dash	10-yard split	20-yard split	20-yard shuttle	Three-cone drill	Vertical jump	Broad jump	Bench press
6 ft 0 7/8 in (1.85 m)	229 lb (104 kg)	30 1/2 in (0.77 m)	10 in (0.25 m)	6 ft 1 1/2 in (1.87 m)	4.68 s	1.62 s	2.69 s	4.50 s	7.08 s	32.5 in (0.83 m)	9 ft 6 in (2.90 m)	24 reps
All values from NFL Combine/Pro Day

After his senior season, Wilson was invited to play in the Senior Bowl where he was fourth on the north team with six tackles. In preparation for the 2011 NFL draft, Wilson was also invited to the NFL Scouting Combine.

Wilson was selected by the Carolina Panthers in the sixth round (166th overall).

On September 5, 2011, he was signed to the Panthers' practice squad.

On November 8, 2011, after being cited for speeding and marijuana possession, the Carolina Panthers released Wilson from the practice squad and team.

Lawrence would eventually end up with the Tennessee Titans before being cut May 1, 2012. Two weeks later, he was signed to the New Orleans Saints. By July, the NFL suspended Wilson one game and fined him an additional game check for violating the league's substance abuse policy attributing to the November 2011 incident. On August 31, 2012, the Saints released Wilson during final cuts.

On January 10, 2013, Wilson was signed by the Chicago Bears. He was waived on August 25.

On October 9, 2013, Wilson was signed by the Toronto Argonauts of the Canadian Football League to a practice roster agreement. He was released by the Argonauts on October 12, 2013.

On November 19, 2013, the Chicago Bears signed Wilson again, this time to the practice squad. Wilson was cut by the Bears on June 5, 2014.

On July 22, 2014, Wilson was signed by the St. Louis Rams. He was waived during final cuts on August 30. 2014.
