= Malcolm Johnson (fullback) =

American football player (born 1992)

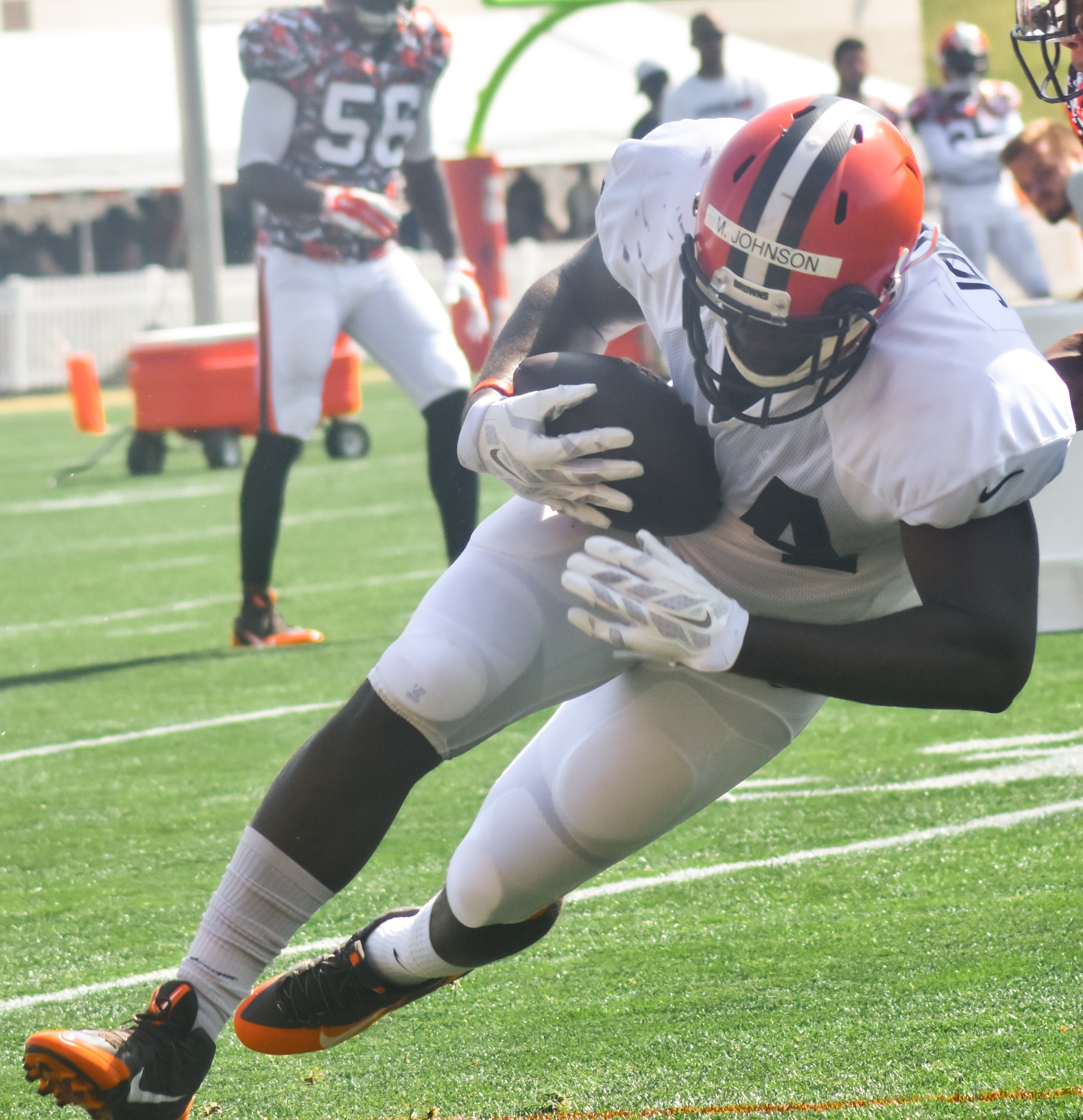
- Johnson with the Cleveland Browns in 2015

No. 42, 46
- Position: Fullback

Personal information
- Born: August 11, 1992 (age 34); Tuscaloosa, Alabama, U.S.
- Listed height: 6 ft 1 in (1.85 m)
- Listed weight: 231 lb (105 kg)

Career information
- High school: Northridge (Tuscaloosa)
- College: Mississippi State
- NFL draft: 2015: 6th round, 195th overall pick

Career history
- Cleveland Browns (2015–2016); Seattle Seahawks (2016–2017)*; San Francisco 49ers (2018)*; Green Bay Packers (2018–2019)
- * Offseason or practice squad member only

Awards and highlights
- Second-team All-SEC (2013)

Career NFL statistics
- Rushing attempts: 1
- Rushing yards: 2
- Receptions: 9
- Receiving yards: 59
- Stats at Pro Football Reference

Malcolm Jamaine Johnson (born August 11, 1992) is an American former professional football player who was a fullback in the National Football League (NFL). He played college football for the Mississippi State Bulldogs and was selected by the Cleveland Browns in the sixth round of the 2015 NFL draft. He was also a member of the Seattle Seahawks, San Francisco 49ers and Green Bay Packers.

== Early life ==
Malcolm Jamaine Johnson was born August 11, 1992, to James and Genesis Johnson. He was raised in Tuscaloosa, Alabama.

He enrolled at Northridge High School in Tuscaloosa, where he was a standout basketball player in his sophomore (2007–2008) and junior (2008–2009) years. But his best sport was football, where he played both tight end and wide receiver. In his junior year season (2009), he caught 41 receptions (nine of them for touchdowns) for 492 yards (450 m). He nearly equalled this mark in the 2010 season, catching 39 receptions (eight for touchdowns) for 598 yards (547 m). He also added a ground attack, rushing for 137 yards (125 m) on 30 carries and passing three time (twice for completions).

Both Rivals.com and ESPN ranked him as a three-star prospect (out of four star). ESPN ranked him the 75th best high school wide receiver in the nation, and Rivals.com ranked him the 33rd best college recruit in the state of Alabama regardless of position. He participated in the Rivals.com football recruiting camps in Birmingham, Alabama, and Atlanta, Georgia, and received Most Valuable Player honors at each camp. After graduating from high school, he committed to play at Mississippi State University in July 2009.

== College career ==
Johnson was redshirted at Mississippi State, attending classes, practicing with the football team, and dressing for play but not competing in games.

Beginning with his second year, Johnson was a starter for Mississippi State at tight end. His role on the team was not a traditional one, as he often played the role of a wingback or slotback. He started in 11 of the team's 12 games that year, but did not catch a pass until the sixth game of the season. In his second game, he had a season-high 51 yards (47 m) receiving yards, and in his third caught a season-high three passes (including one for a touchdown). His career-best catch of 37 yards (34 m) came in the Music City Bowl on December 30. He finished the year with 11 receptions for 206 yards (188 m) (three for touchdowns), leading all Southeastern Conference (SEC) freshmen tight ends in both receptions and receiving yards, and tying for the most touchdowns, which led him to be named to the All-SEC Freshman Team.

Johnson suffered a torn pectoral muscle during pre-season practice in August 2012, which caused him to miss the first five games. He started in the last eight games of the season, and in his season debut game against the Tennessee Volunteers he made a one-handed touchdown reception on fourth-and-goal with nine seconds left to win the game.

In his senior year in the 2013 season, Johnson started the year with an undisclosed injury he received in training camp. By the time the season began, however, he had recovered and had an outstanding season—catching 30 receptions for 391 yards (358 m) (two for touchdowns), averaging about 17 yards (16 m) per catch. He had the third most receiving yards for Mississippi State that year, and was tied for second on the team with 19 receptions for first downs. He had a college-career longest reception of 60 yards (55 m) against the Kentucky Wildcats on October 24, his first touchdown reception of the year. He had a college career best game against the Alabama Crimson Tide on November 16, catching six receptions for 84 yards (77 m), including two of 20 yards (18 m) or more. He was named to the All-SEC second-team for his efforts.

As a fifth-year senior in the 2014 season, Johnson was named team co-captain, and played in all 13 games (starting in 12 of them). Although he was only the team's fourth-leading receiver, he was the top tight end—catching 28 passes for 380 yards (350 m) (three for touchdowns). During the game against the Auburn Tigers on October 11, he caught five passes (more than any other team member in a single game that year) for 60 yards (55 m). Defeating Auburn, then the second-ranked team in the nation, propelled Mississippi State to number one in the Associated Press coaches football poll. The team went from unranked to Number 1 in just five weeks, the fastest rise in the poll's history. Mississippi State played in the 2014 Orange Bowl, where Johnson caught three receptions for 36 yards (33 m). His efforts on the field won him a position on the All-SEC second-team once more.

By the end of his college career, Johnson had played in 45 games, 23 of them as a starter. He caught a total of 79 passes for 1,148 yards (1,050 m) and 10 touchdowns.

Johnson received his bachelor's degree from Mississippi State in December 2014. He then enrolled in a master's degree in workforce education, with an expected graduation date of May 2015.

== Professional career ==
=== Cleveland Browns ===
Sportswriter Joel A. Erickson, writing in The Birmingham News in September 2013, called Johnson's college career "somewhat spotty", noting that his best year for receptions was his first year. Amid worries that he might not be picked at all, Johnson was selected by the Cleveland Browns in the sixth round of the 2015 NFL draft. He was the first tight end from Mississippi State to be drafted since Donald Lee in 2003.

On May 11, 2015, Johnson signed a four-year contract with the Browns worth $2.39 million. He played in 12 regular season games as a fullback that fall, starting five, and had no rushing attempts but caught four passes for 15 yards. The following season, he played in seven games, starting one, had one run for two yards but fumbled, and caught five passes for 44 yards. Johnson was waived by the Browns on October 24, 2016.

=== Seattle Seahawks ===
On November 23, 2016, Johnson was signed to the practice squad of the Seattle Seahawks. He was released on November 29, 2016. He was re-signed on December 20, 2016. He signed a reserve/future contract with the Seahawks on January 16, 2017.

On May 11, 2017, Johnson was waived/injured by the Seahawks and placed on injured reserve. He was waived from injured reserve on June 19, 2017.

=== San Francisco 49ers ===
On January 2, 2018, Johnson signed a reserve/future contract with the San Francisco 49ers. He was waived on September 1, 2018.

=== Green Bay Packers ===
On November 28, 2018, Johnson was signed to the Green Bay Packers practice squad. He signed a reserve/future contract with the Packers on December 31, 2018. On August 31, 2019, he was placed on injured reserve.

== NFL career statistics ==
=== Regular season ===
Year	Team	Games		Rushing					Receiving					Fumbles	
Year	Team	GP	GS	Att	Yds	Avg	Lng	TD	Rec	Yds	Avg	Lng	TD	Fum	Lost
2015	CLE	12	5	0	0	0	0	0	4	15	3.8	8	0	0	0
2016	CLE	7	1	1	2	2.0	2	0	5	44	8.8	21	0	1	0
Total		19	6	1	2	2.0	2	0	9	59	6.5	21	0	1	0
Source: NFL.com
