= Northridge High School (Alabama) =

Coordinates: 33.24484°N 87.52771°W

Location
- 2901 Northridge Road; Tuscaloosa, Alabama 35406; United States

Information
- Type: Public
- Motto: "A commitment to excellence"
- Founded: 2003 (23 years ago)
- School district: Tuscaloosa City Schools
- CEEB code: 012686
- Principal: Jessica Williams
- Staff: 55.00 (FTE)
- Grades: 9-12
- Enrollment: 1,158 (2023-2024)
- Student to teacher ratio: 21.05
- Campus type: Suburban
- Colors: Light Blue, Black & White
- Nickname: Jaguars
- Feeder schools: Northridge Middle
- Website: nhs.tuscaloosacityschools.com

Northridge High School is a public high school in Tuscaloosa, Alabama, United States, enrolling just over 1000 students in grades 9–12 as of spring 2021. It is one of three high schools in the Tuscaloosa City Schools. It offers technical and academic programs, as well as joint enrollment with Shelton State Community College and the University of Alabama. Northridge High School is accredited by the Southern Association of Colleges and Schools.

Founded in 2003, Northridge is one of the two youngest public high schools in Tuscaloosa. After the retirement of Central High School East, the Tuscaloosa City School system divided the city into three schools: Northridge High School, Paul W. Bryant High School (both of which were opened in 2003), and Central High School. Northridge High School is located on the north side of the Black Warrior River on Northridge Road.

== Academics ==
=== Profile ===
As of 2024, 35% of Northridge High's enrollment is African American, 3% is of Asian descent, 54% is of European descent, and the remainder is mostly Hispanic. 35% of students are eligible for free and reduced lunch.

Northridge offers the most AP Classes in Tuscaloosa County, including the following:

- Biology
- Chemistry
- Calculus (AB & BC)
- English Language and Composition
- English Literature and Composition
- Environmental Science
- European History
- Human Geography
- Psychology
- Seminar
- Spanish Language and Culture
- Statistics
- United States Government and Politics
- United States History
- Word History: Modern

Additionally, Northridge students can take the AP courses Computer Science Principles and Computer Science A through Tuscaloosa Career and Technology Academy.

=== History ===
On average, four Northridge High students earn the National Merit Finalist Cy Young status each year.

=== Exchange students ===
Northridge is a hospital school for students all over the world. In 2010 Northridge hosted students from Russia, Ukraine, Georgia, Mozambique, Kenya, North Korea, Kazakhstan, and Germany.

== Athletics ==
The nickname for Northridge sports teams is the "Northridge Jaguars." As of 2025, the school competes in class 6A of the Alabama High School Athletic Association (AHSAA).

=== Football ===
In their 2011 season the Northridge Jaguars finished with a 10-2 record, the best record in school history, moving on to the second round of the Alabama 6A playoffs.

Notable alumni include Brodric Martin, NFL defensive tackle for Detroit Lions; Malcolm Johnson, NFL fullback for Cleveland Browns; Bo Scarbrough, NFL running back for the Detroit Lions and USFL running back for the Birmingham Stallions; and Vinnie Sunseri, NFL safety with New England Patriots.

=== Volleyball ===
In 2023, Northridge volleyball won the 6A AHSAA state championship, with a final record of 26-8-1.

=== Baseball ===
The Northridge baseball team has had four consecutive 20+ win seasons. The Jags won the area championship in 2012 for the first time in school history.

=== Soccer ===
In 2015, The varsity girls' team competed in the Final Four and came in 3rd in the state. In 2016, both varsity teams traveled to Huntsville, with the boys coming 3rd in the state and the girls competing in the finals. The varsity girls' team came second in the state. The soccer teams have competed in more playoff games than any other sport.

=== Golf ===
Notable alumni include Patton Kizzire, an Auburn University and current PGA golfer.

=== Tennis ===
The Northridge varsity girls' team won the 6A state championship in 2018. The Northridge varsity boys’ team won the 6A state championship in 2022.

== Notable alumni ==
- Wilkin Formby, college football offensive tackle for Texas A&M
- Patton Kizzire, multiple winner on PGA Tour
- Malcolm Johnson, NFL fullback
- Brodric Martin, current defensive lineman for the Detroit Lions
- Bo Scarbrough, NFL running back; transferred before his senior season
- Vinnie Sunseri, former NFL safety, former NFL coach, current defensive backs coach for Georgia Tech
