= Vinnie Sunseri =

American football player and coach (born 1993)

Georgia Tech Yellow Jackets
- Title: Defensive backs coach

Personal information
- Born: October 25, 1991 (age 35); Pittsburgh, Pennsylvania, U.S.
- Listed height: 6 ft 0 in (1.83 m)
- Listed weight: 210 lb (95 kg)

Career information
- High school: Northridge (Tuscaloosa, Alabama)
- College: Alabama
- NFL draft: 2014: 5th round, 167th overall pick

Career history

Playing
- New Orleans Saints (2014–2015); New England Patriots (2016)*; San Francisco 49ers (2016)
- * Offseason or practice squad member only

Coaching
- Alabama (2019) Graduate assistant; New England Patriots (2020) Defensive coaching assistant; New England Patriots (2021–2023) Running backs coach; Washington (2024) Safeties coach; Florida (2025) Co-defensive coordinator & safeties coach; Georgia Tech (2026–present) Defensive Backs coach

Awards and highlights
- 2× BCS national champion (2011, 2012)
- Stats at Pro Football Reference

Vincent Salvatore Sunseri (born October 25, 1991) is an American football coach and former player who is the current defensive backs coach for the Georgia Tech Yellow Jackets. He played professionally as a safety in the National Football League (NFL).

Sunseri played college football for the Alabama Crimson Tide and was selected by the New Orleans Saints in the fifth round of the 2014 NFL draft. He served as a graduate assistant for Alabama in 2019.

== Early life ==
Sunseri began his career at Marvin Ridge High School in Waxhaw, North Carolina. As a junior, he made 107 tackles, 15 tackles for loss, two sacks, and five interceptions, while also rushing for 305 yards and three touchdowns. He moved to Northridge High School in Tuscaloosa, Alabama. in January 2010; as a senior he recorded 144 tackles, 19 tackles for loss, three interceptions, four fumble recoveries, and two touchdowns. He was selected to play in the Under Armour All-America Game. Considered a four-star recruit by ESPN.com, Sunseri was listed as the No. 18 outside linebacker in the nation in 2011.

== College career ==
As a freshman in 2011, Sunseri was second on the team with 11 special teams tackles, all coming on kickoff coverage. He has 31 total tackles to rank eighth on the team. Sunseri also played on the punt return team and recorded several attention-grabbing blocks. Against Kent State, he set a career-high with six tackles, including three solo stops. Along with fellow freshman Trey DePriest, Sunseri registered several big hits on kickoff coverage. He also saw time at safety in the 48–7 win. Sunseri was selected as the coaches' Special Teams Player of the Week. Against Penn State, he did not have a tackle but was named a Special Teams Player of the Week with excellent coverage on the kickoff team and blocking on punt return. Against North Texas, Sunseri recorded another big tackle night with six stops split between special teams and safety. Sunseri had three solo tackles against the Mean Green. Against Arkansas, he assisted on two tackles in the win against the Razorbacks. Against Florida, Sunseri was named a Special Teams Player of the Week by the Alabama coaching staff. He recorded two solo tackles and forced a fumble. Against Ole Miss, Sunseri was once again named a Special Teams Player of the Week. He totaled six tackles, including four solo stops, against the Rebels. Against Tennessee, Sunseri totaled two tackles, including a solo stop. He recovered his first career fumble in the win against the Volunteers. Against Georgia Southern, Sunseri was named one of the Alabama coaching staff's Special Teams Players of the Week. He recorded one solo tackle on kickoff coverage. Against Auburn, Sunseri tied a career-high with six tackles, including four solo stops. He recorded a quarterback hurry against the Tigers. Sunseri played significant time at safety in the second half against the Tigers.

== NFL playing career ==
Pre-draft measurables
Height	Weight	Arm length	Hand span	40-yard dash	Bench press
5 ft 11 1/8 in (1.81 m)	210 lb (95 kg)	30 in (0.76 m)	10 in (0.25 m)	4.56 s	21 reps
All values from NFL Combine/Pro Day

=== New Orleans Saints ===
Sunseri was selected by the New Orleans Saints in the fifth round, 167th overall, in the 2014 NFL draft. On May 16, 2014, Sunseri signed his four-year rookie contract with the Saints. On November 12, Sunseri was placed on injured reserve with an arm injury. Sunseri made nine total appearances for New Orleans during his rookie campaign, recording five combined tackles.

On September 1, 2015, Sunseri was waived by the Saints. The next day, after clearing waivers, Sunseri was placed on injured reserve due to a knee injury.

On April 25, 2016, Sunseri was released by New Orleans.

=== New England Patriots ===
On July 24, 2016, Sunseri was signed by the New England Patriots. On September 3, he was released by the Patriots as a part of final roster cuts. On September 6, Sunseri was re-signed to the Patriots' practice squad. He was released by the Patriots on October 24.

=== San Francisco 49ers ===
On November 1, 2016, Sunseri was signed to the San Francisco 49ers' practice squad. He was promoted to the active roster on November 22. Sunseri made six appearances for San Francisco, compiling six total tackles.

On September 1, 2017, Sunseri was waived by the 49ers.

== Coaching career ==
=== Alabama ===
In 2019 Sunseri spent the season as a graduate assistant at Alabama, his alma mater. He was coaching alongside his brother, Tino, who also was a graduate assistant and his father, Sal, who was the linebackers coach.

=== New England ===
In 2020, Sunseri was hired by the New England Patriots in a support staff role. From 2021 to 2023, he served as the team's running backs coach.

=== Washington Huskies ===
On February 5, 2024, Sunseri was hired by the Washington Huskies as the team's safeties coach, joining fellow former Patriots coach Steve Belichick on the defensive staff.

=== Florida Gators ===
On January 30, 2025, Sunseri was hired by the Florida Gators to serve as the team's safeties coach and co-defensive coordinator, joining Billy Napier’s staff as a former player at Alabama.

=== Georgia Tech ===
On December 31, 2025, Sunseri was hired to serve on Georgia Tech's coaching staff as the team's safeties coach, although as of October 11, 2026, he is listed on the Georgia Tech Athletic Staff Directory as the defensive backs coach (safeties and cornerbacks).

== Personal life ==
Sunseri's father is Sal Sunseri, former linebackers coach for the Oakland Raiders, and his older brother is Tino Sunseri, who played quarterback for the Saskatchewan Roughriders.
