= Brodric Martin =

American football player (born 1999)

Orlando Storm
- Position: Nose tackle
- Roster status: Unsigned draft pcik

Personal information
- Born: May 24, 1999 (age 27); Tuscaloosa, Alabama, U.S.
- Listed height: 6 ft 5 in (1.96 m)
- Listed weight: 330 lb (150 kg)

Career information
- High school: Northridge (Tuscaloosa)
- College: North Alabama (2017–2020); Western Kentucky (2021–2022)
- NFL draft: 2023: 3rd round, 96th overall pick

Career history
- Detroit Lions (2023–2024); Kansas City Chiefs (2025)*; Pittsburgh Steelers (2025); Las Vegas Raiders (2025); Arizona Cardinals (2026)*; Orlando Storm (2027-present)
- * Offseason or practice squad member only

Career NFL statistics as of 2025
- Total tackles: 4
- Stats at Pro Football Reference

Brodric Martin-Rhodes (né Martin; born May 24, 1999) is an American professional football nose tackle. He played college football for the North Alabama Lions and Western Kentucky Hilltoppers before being selected by the Detroit Lions in the third round of the 2023 NFL draft.

== Early life ==
Martin was born on May 24, 1999, in Tuscaloosa, Alabama. He attended Northridge High School in Tuscaloosa but was not a highly-recruited prospect, not even placing on 247Sports' player rankings. He committed to play college football at North Alabama.

== College career ==
=== North Alabama ===
Martin redshirted as a freshman at North Alabama in 2017. He appeared in all 10 games the following year, starting one, and posted 27 tackles, including three for a loss. In 2019, he placed seventh on the team with 43 tackles while starting all 11 matches, additionally making 4.5 tackles-for-loss and two sacks. The 2020 season was shortened due to the COVID-19 pandemic, and Martin played in all four games, posting 11 tackles with 1.5 tackles-for-loss. He transferred to Western Kentucky (WKU) in 2021, and finished his stint at North Alabama having appeared in all of their 25 games from 2018 to 2020, posting 81 total tackles (of which, 44 were assists and 37 solo), nine tackles-for-loss, two sacks, and four pass deflections.

=== Western Kentucky ===
In his first year at WKU, Martin played in all 14 games and recorded 31 tackles with 4.5 tackles-for-loss, along with 2.5 sacks. He helped them win the division championship, and his best game came in the conference title match against UTSA, in which he made seven tackles and a half-sack. Martin started all 14 games for Western Kentucky in 2022, and was named honorable mention all-conference after tallying 31 tackles, 1.5 sacks, seven quarterback hurries, a forced fumble and two pass breakups. He was invited to the East–West Shrine Bowl, at which he made two tackles and a fumble recovery, and finished his stint at WKU with 62 tackles, six for-loss, four sacks, three passes defended and one fumble forced.

== Professional career ==
Pre-draft measurables
Height	Weight	Arm length	Hand span	Wingspan	40-yard dash	10-yard split	20-yard split	20-yard shuttle	Three-cone drill	Vertical jump	Broad jump	Bench press
6 ft 4 5/8 in (1.95 m)	337 lb (153 kg)	35 in (0.89 m)	9 1/8 in (0.23 m)	6 ft 11 1/4 in (2.11 m)	5.36 s	1.81 s	3.07 s	4.94 s	8.16 s	25.0 in (0.64 m)	8 ft 4 in (2.54 m)	20 reps
All values from Pro Day

=== Detroit Lions ===
Martin was selected by the Detroit Lions in the third round (96th overall) of the 2023 NFL draft. As a rookie, he appeared in three games in the 2023 season.

Martin began the 2024 season on injured reserve. He was activated on November 20.

On August 26, 2025, Martin was waived by the Lions as part of final roster cuts.

=== Kansas City Chiefs ===
On August 29, 2025, Martin was signed to the Kansas City Chiefs' practice squad.

=== Pittsburgh Steelers ===
On November 5, 2025, Martin was signed by the Pittsburgh Steelers to their active roster. He was released on December 18 after appearing in one game for the Steelers.

=== Las Vegas Raiders ===
On December 19, 2025, Martin was claimed off waivers by the Las Vegas Raiders. On May 13, 2026, Martin was waived by the Raiders with an injury designation.

=== Arizona Cardinals ===
On August 1, 2026, Martin signed with the Arizona Cardinals. On August 30, Martin was waived by the Cardinals as a part of final roster cuts.
