= Druid High School =

Defunct high school in Alabama, United States

Coordinates: 33°11′52″N 87°34′37″W

Information
- Former name: Industrial City High School
- Closed: 1979

Druid High School, originally Industrial City High School was a senior high school for black students in Tuscaloosa, Alabama, and a part of Tuscaloosa City Schools.

The school had black children from all social classes. The instruction emphasized manual trades instead of university careers, and lacked the resources held by the all-white Tuscaloosa High School. The school had a reputation for strong teachers as African-Americans at the time had few other prestigious career options. Nikole Hanna-Jones of ProPublica stated "Druid was a source of pride within the city’s black community."

In 1970 the school was desegregated but only with a handful of students attending.

In 1979 it was consolidated with Tuscaloosa High School to form Central High School (Tuscaloosa, Alabama). The former school identity, including mascots and colors, was discarded.

== Notable alumni ==
- Joe Dawson (born 1960), American-Israeli basketball player, 1992 Israeli Basketball Premier League MVP
- Speedy Duncan (1942–2021), American professional football player.
- Archie Wade (born 1939), first African-American faculty member at the University of Alabama
