= Seth Williams (wide receiver) =

American football player (born 2000)

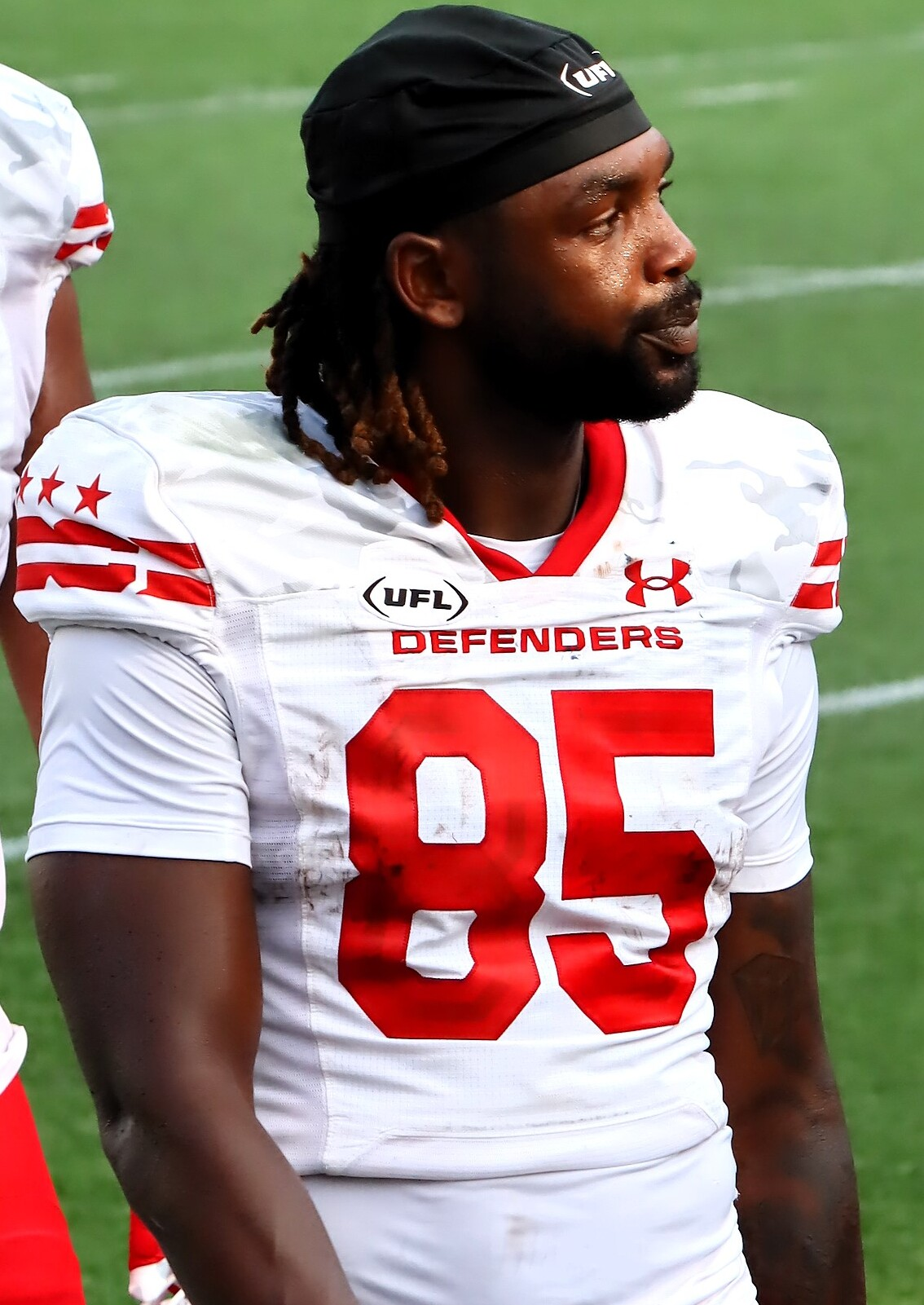
- Williams with the DC Defenders in 2025

No. 11 – DC Defenders
- Position: Wide receiver
- Roster status: Active

Personal information
- Born: April 10, 2000 (age 26); Tuscaloosa, Alabama, U.S.
- Listed height: 6 ft 3 in (1.91 m)
- Listed weight: 211 lb (96 kg)

Career information
- High school: Paul W. Bryant (Tuscaloosa)
- College: Auburn (2018–2020)
- NFL draft: 2021: 6th round, 219th overall pick

Career history
- Denver Broncos (2021); Jacksonville Jaguars (2022–2023)*; Dallas Cowboys (2024)*; DC Defenders (2025); Las Vegas Raiders (2025)*; DC Defenders (2026–present)
- * Offseason or practice squad member only

Awards and highlights
- UFL champion (2025)

Career NFL statistics as of 2024
- Receptions: 1
- Receiving yards: 34
- Stats at Pro Football Reference

Seth Williams (born April 10, 2000) is an American professional football wide receiver for the DC Defenders of the United Football League (UFL). He played college football for the Auburn Tigers.

== Early life ==
Williams attended Paul W. Bryant High School in Tuscaloosa, Alabama. He committed to Auburn University over his hometown University of Alabama to play college football.

== College career ==
As a freshman at Auburn in 2018, Williams had 26 receptions for 534 yards and five touchdowns. He became Auburn's number one receiver his sophomore year in 2019. As a sophomore Williams recorded 59 receptions for 830 yards and eight touchdowns. As a junior in 2020, Williams recorded 47 receptions for 760 yards and four touchdowns. Following his junior season Williams declared for the 2021 NFL draft.

== Professional career ==
Pre-draft measurables
Height	Weight	Arm length	Hand span	Wingspan	40-yard dash	10-yard split	20-yard split	20-yard shuttle	Three-cone drill	Vertical jump	Broad jump	Bench press
6 ft 3 in (1.91 m)	211 lb (96 kg)	33 1/2 in (0.85 m)	9 7/8 in (0.25 m)	6 ft 9 1/8 in (2.06 m)	4.49 s	1.63 s	2.59 s	4.43 s	7.20 s	37.0 in (0.94 m)	10 ft 4 in (3.15 m)	12 reps
All values from Pro Day

=== Denver Broncos ===
Williams was selected in the sixth round, 219th overall, of the 2021 NFL draft by the Denver Broncos. On May 12, 2021, Williams officially signed with the Broncos. He was waived on August 31, 2021, and re-signed to the practice squad the next day. On January 2, 2022, Williams made his NFL debut in the team's week 17 game against the Los Angeles Chargers. Williams recorded his first career catch on a 34-yard pass from Drew Lock in the 34–13 loss. He was promoted to the active roster on January 3. Williams was waived by the Broncos on August 30, 2022.

=== Jacksonville Jaguars ===
On September 2, 2022, Williams was signed to the Jacksonville Jaguars practice squad. He signed a reserve/future contract on January 23, 2023.

On August 29, 2023, Williams was waived by the Jaguars and re-signed to the practice squad. He signed a reserve/futures contract with the Jaguars on January 9, 2024. He was waived on August 25.

=== Dallas Cowboys ===
On October 9, 2024, Williams was signed to the Dallas Cowboys practice squad. He signed a reserve/future contract with Dallas on January 6, 2025. On May 7, Williams was waived by the Cowboys.

=== DC Defenders ===
On May 12, 2025, Williams signed with the DC Defenders of the United Football League (UFL).

=== Las Vegas Raiders ===
On July 22, 2025, Williams signed with the Las Vegas Raiders. He was waived/injured on August 10.

=== DC Defenders ===
On January 13, 2026, Williams was selected by the DC Defenders in the 2026 UFL draft.
