= David Robertson (baseball) =

American baseball player (born 1985)

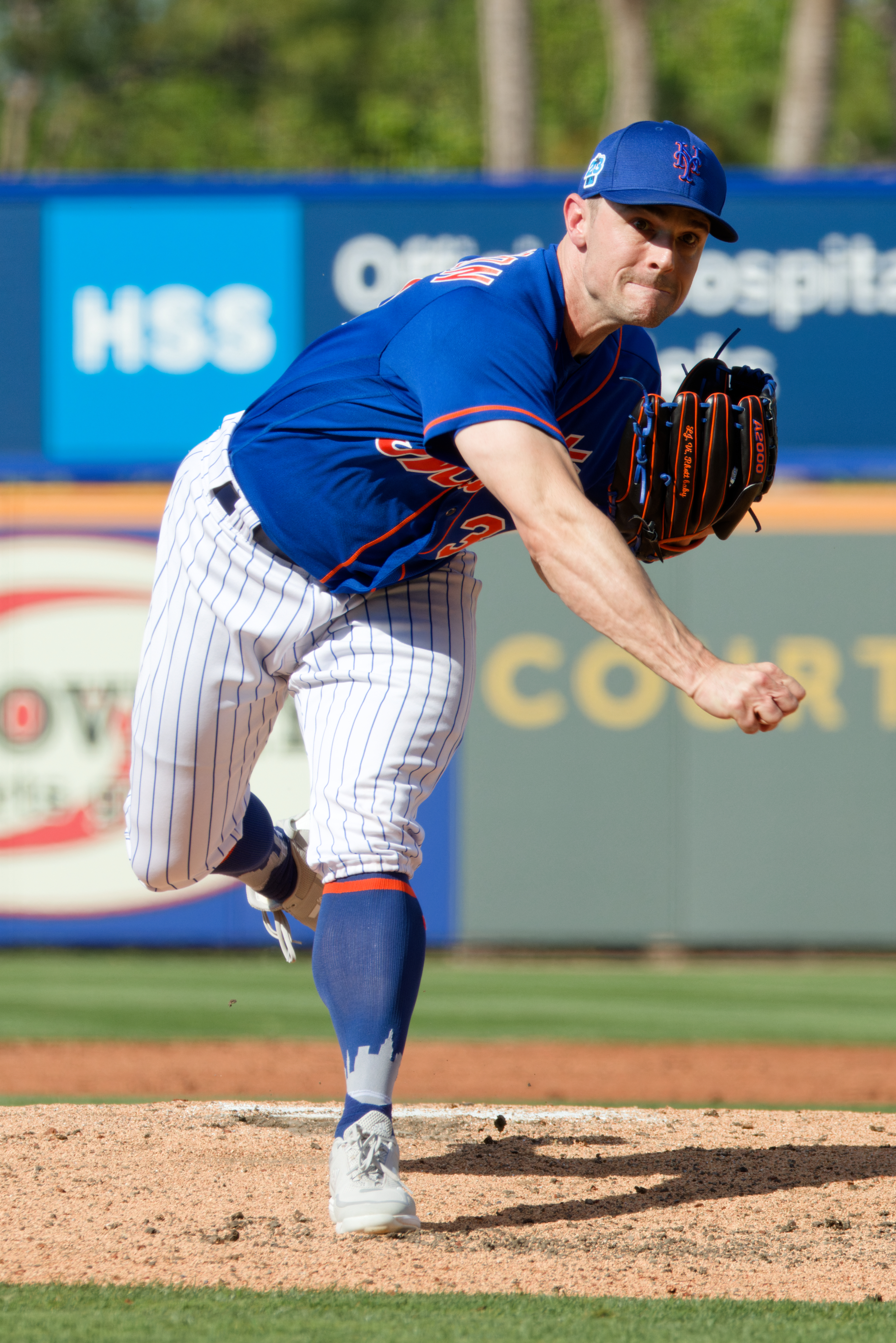
- Robertson with the New York Mets in 2023
- Pitcher
- Born: April 9, 1985 (age 41); Birmingham, Alabama, U.S.
- Batted: Right Threw: Right

MLB debut
- June 29, 2008, for the New York Yankees

Last MLB appearance
- September 28, 2025, for the Philadelphia Phillies

MLB statistics
- Win–loss record: 68–46
- Earned run average: 2.93
- Strikeouts: 1,176
- Saves: 179
- Stats at Baseball Reference

Teams
- New York Yankees (2008–2014); Chicago White Sox (2015–2017); New York Yankees (2017–2018); Philadelphia Phillies (2019); Tampa Bay Rays (2021); Chicago Cubs (2022); Philadelphia Phillies (2022); New York Mets (2023); Miami Marlins (2023); Texas Rangers (2024); Philadelphia Phillies (2025)

Career highlights and awards
- All-Star (2011); World Series champion (2009)
Medals
Men's baseball
Representing United States
Olympic Games
Silver medal – second place	2020 Tokyo	Team
World Baseball Classic
Gold medal – first place	2017 Los Angeles	Team

David Alan Robertson (born April 9, 1985), nicknamed "D-Rob", is an American former professional baseball relief pitcher who played for eight teams during a 17-season career in Major League Baseball (MLB). Robertson won a World Series ring in 2009 as a member of the New York Yankees and made the American League All-Star Team in 2011.

Robertson played college baseball for the Alabama Crimson Tide. He was drafted by the Yankees in the 17th round of the 2006 MLB draft and made his MLB debut with the Yankees in 2008. After longtime Yankees closer Mariano Rivera retired, Robertson served as the Yankees' closer in 2014. He signed with the Chicago White Sox as a free agent after the 2014 season and was traded back to the Yankees in July 2017. Robertson signed with the Philadelphia Phillies as a free agent after the 2018 season. He went on to spend short stints with the Phillies, the Tampa Bay Rays, the Chicago Cubs, the New York Mets, the Miami Marlins, and the Texas Rangers before announcing his retirement in January 2026.

In international competition, Robertson won a gold medal in the 2017 World Baseball Classic in Los Angeles as a member of the United States national baseball team. He also won a silver medal with the national team at the 2020 Summer Olympics in Tokyo. Robertson and his wife, Erin, are the co-founders of High Socks for Hope, a disaster relief charity.

== Amateur career ==
Robertson was born in Birmingham, Alabama, and played his first three years of high school baseball at Central-Tuscaloosa High School in Tuscaloosa, Alabama. He was a two-year starter for the Falcons at shortstop and pitcher. He helped lead his team to back-to-back area titles, as well as back-to-back 6A State Playoff appearances. After his junior year, Central High School was split into three smaller high schools, and Robertson attended Paul W. Bryant High School in Tuscaloosa, graduating in 2004. He led the Stampede to an area title and the Class 6A State Playoffs in the school's first year of existence.

Robertson enrolled at the University of Alabama and played college baseball for the Alabama Crimson Tide. As a freshman in 2005, Robertson appeared in a team-high 32 games with three games started. He compiled a 7–5 win–loss record with eight saves and a 2.92 earned run average (ERA), and set the single-season rookie record for most strikeouts (105). He led the Southeastern Conference (SEC) by limiting hitters to a .183 batting average. He was named Freshman All-SEC and Freshman All-American by Baseball America, Louisville Slugger Freshman All-American, and Collegiate Baseball Magazine Freshman All-American.

In his sophomore season, Robertson helped lead the Crimson Tide to their 25th SEC Championship. He appeared in 29 games, compiling a 4–4 record with a 3.02 ERA. He led the SEC with 10 saves. In 2006, he played collegiate summer baseball in the Cape Cod Baseball League for the Yarmouth-Dennis Red Sox and was named the most valuable player of the playoffs in Yarmouth-Dennis' championship season.

== Minor leagues ==
Due to Robertson being 21 at the time of the 2006 MLB draft, he was a draft-eligible sophomore and the New York Yankees selected him in the 17th round. He signed with the Yankees for a $200,000 signing bonus.

In 2007, pitching for the Charleston RiverDogs of the Single-A South Atlantic League, the Tampa Yankees of the High-A Florida State League, and the Trenton Thunder of the Double-A Eastern League, he was a combined 8–3 with four saves and an 0.96 ERA in 84 1/3 innings, allowing 45 hits while striking out 114 batters, averaging 12.1 strikeouts per nine innings. Robertson was a 2007 mid-season South Atlantic League All Star. He was third among minor league relievers, with a .154 opponents batting average.

In 2008, pitching for Trenton and the Scranton/Wilkes-Barre Yankees of the Triple-A International League, he was 4–0 with three saves and a 1.68 ERA in 53 2/3 innings, allowing 28 hits while striking out 77, averaging 12.9 strikeouts per nine innings. He was named the International League's "Best Reliever" of 2008 in Baseball America's Best Tools survey. Pitching for Scranton/Wilkes-Barre in 2009, he was 0–3 with two saves and a 1.84 ERA with 25 strikeouts in 14 2/3 innings, averaging 15.3 strikeouts per nine innings. In 2012 he pitched two scoreless innings for Scranton/Wilkes-Barre.

== Major leagues ==
=== New York Yankees (2008–2014) ===
==== 2008–2011 ====
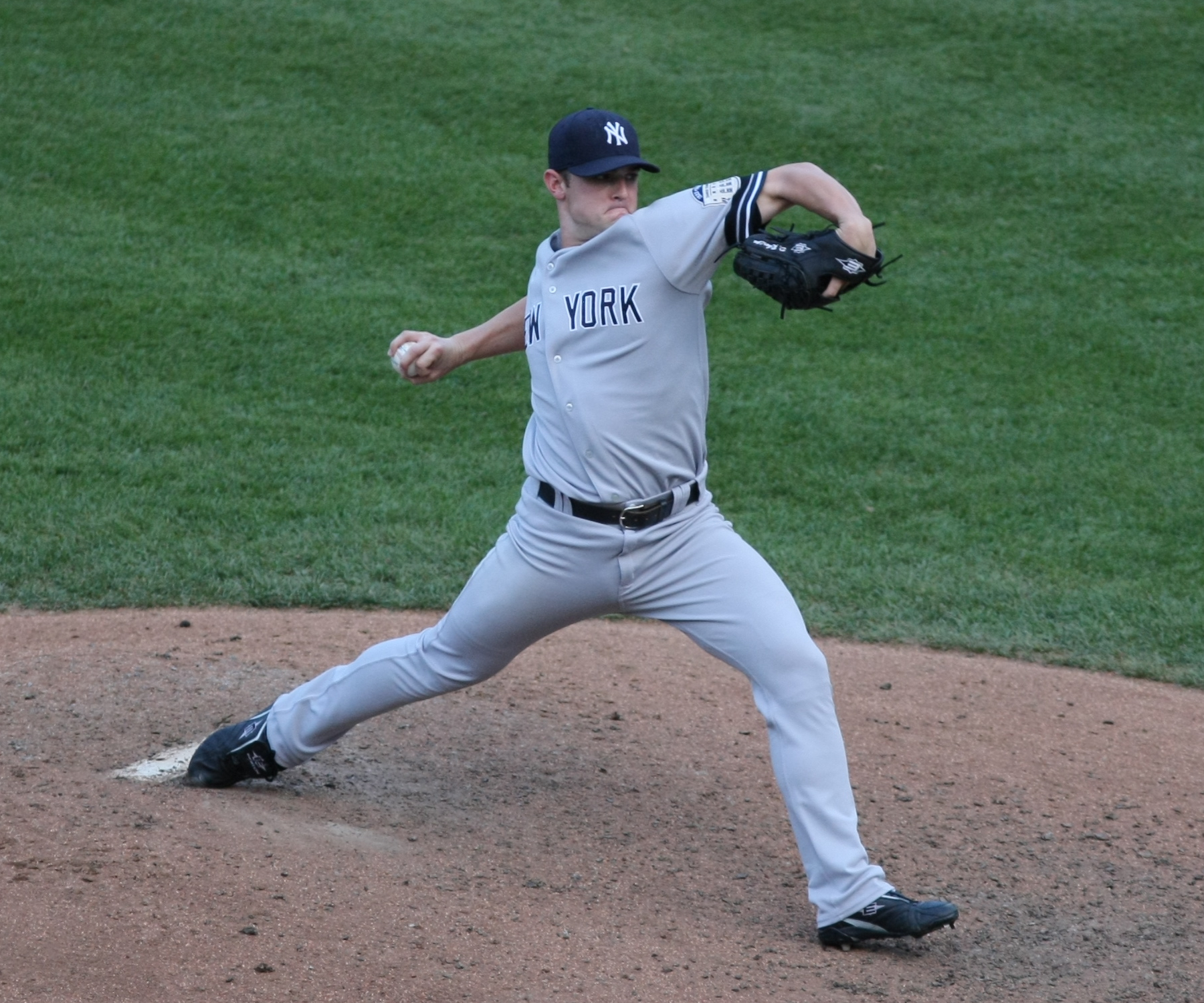
Robertson with the Yankees in 2008

On June 28, 2008, the Yankees called Robertson up from Scranton/Wilkes-Barre. On August 28, the Yankees optioned him back to Scranton/Wilkes-Barre with a 6.31 ERA. He was recalled back to MLB on September 13. He appeared in 25 MLB games in 2008, going 4–0 with a save and a 5.34 ERA, and 51 strikeouts in 34 innings, averaging 13.1 strikeouts per nine innings.

After starting the 2009 regular season in Triple-A, Robertson was recalled to MLB on April 16, to replace Xavier Nady, who had been placed on the 15-day disabled list. The next day he was optioned back to Triple-A to open a roster spot for Juan Miranda. On May 25, he was again recalled to MLB, to replace reliever Brian Bruney. Robertson finished the season 2–1 with a save and a 3.30 ERA and 63 strikeouts in 43 2/3 innings.

In the 2009 playoffs, Robertson entered two games in high-pressure situations with multiple runners on base, once in the ALDS and once in the ALCS, and did not allow any runs to score. Robertson received the win in each of those games. The Yankees won the 2009 World Series over the Philadelphia Phillies.

Robertson finished the 2010 season with a 4–5 record, one save, a 3.82 ERA, and 71 strikeouts in 61 1/3 innings, averaging 10.4 strikeouts per nine innings.

In Game 6 of the 2010 ALCS against the Texas Rangers, Robertson relieved Phil Hughes in the fifth inning and surrendered a two-run home run to Nelson Cruz which gave the Rangers a 5–1 lead; the Rangers would win the game 6–1 to take the AL pennant.

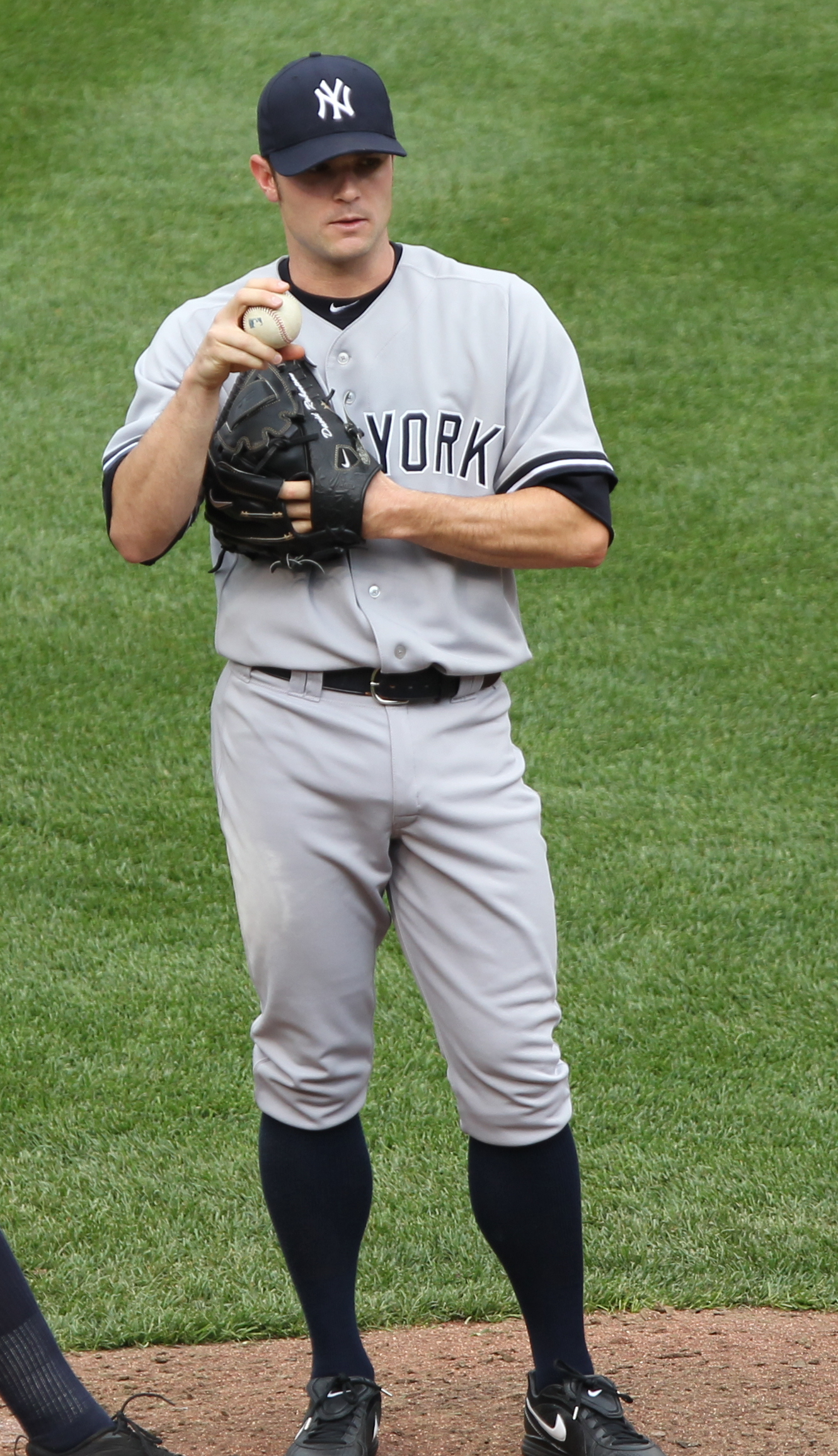
Robertson with the Yankees in 2011

The Yankees entered the 2011 season with the additions of relief pitchers Pedro Feliciano and Rafael Soriano. Robertson lost out to Joba Chamberlain to be the seventh inning specialist whom manager Joe Girardi wanted to bridge to Soriano and closer Mariano Rivera. Injuries to Feliciano, Soriano, and Chamberlain put Robertson in the eighth inning setup role, where he had 55 strikeouts halfway through the season. Robertson was named to the 2011 American League All-Star roster, replacing David Price.

Robertson finished his breakout 2011 season 4–0 with a save, 34 holds (tied for the AL lead), leading the league in ERA (1.08), along with a 13.5 strikeouts per nine innings ratio (second in the AL, and the highest ratio by a Yankee reliever in franchise history), and an MLB-leading adjusted ERA+ of 410, in 70 games pitched (fifth in the AL). He finished the season with 100 strikeouts (leading all AL relievers) in 66 2/3 innings, becoming the first Yankee reliever since Rivera (in 1996) to record 100 strikeouts in a single season. He struck out the 300th batter of his career in 219 2/3 career innings on June 24, making him the third-fastest pitcher in major league history to reach that mark after Billy Wagner (194 1/3) and Brad Lidge (210 2/3). He received one point in the voting for both the AL Cy Young Award (the only non-starter or non-closer to receive a vote) and AL Most Valuable Player (MVP) Award (the only reliever to receive a vote). Robertson also won the This Year in Baseball Setup Man of the Year Award.

==== 2012–2014 ====
In January 2012, the Yankees and Robertson agreed on a one-year non-guaranteed contract to avoid arbitration.

When Rivera went down with a season-ending injury in May 2012, Girardi announced that Robertson and Soriano would share the duties of closing games for the remainder of the season. Robertson himself was placed on the 15-day disabled list however on May 15, after he strained a muscle in his rib cage, 12 days after Rivera's season-ending injury. He returned to action on June 15, but after several appearances became the setup man for Soriano. Robertson finished the 2012 season with a record of 2–7, a 2.67 ERA, two saves, and 30 holds (tied for third in the AL) in 65 games, with 81 strikeouts in 60 2/3 innings, averaging 12.0 strikeouts per nine innings.

In 2013, Robertson served as the eighth inning setup reliever behind Rivera. He appeared in 70 games, going 5–1 with three saves and 33 holds (second in the AL) and a 2.04 ERA and 77 strikeouts in 66 1/3 innings, averaging 10.4 strikeouts per nine innings.

Rivera retired after the 2013 season. During spring training in 2014, Robertson was named the Yankees' closer. On April 7, Robertson was placed on the 15-day disabled list due to a groin strain.

Robertson had a 4–5 record and a 3.08 ERA in 2014, was successful on 39 (third in the AL) out of 44 save attempts, and struck out 96 batters in 64 1/3 innings, averaging 13.4 strikeouts per nine innings. In his lone season as Yankees' closer, Robertson garnered praise as a worthy successor to Rivera. He was paid $5.215 million in 2014. On November 10, Robertson declined the Yankees' $15.3-million qualifying offer for the 2015 season, making him a free agent.

=== Chicago White Sox (2015–2017) ===
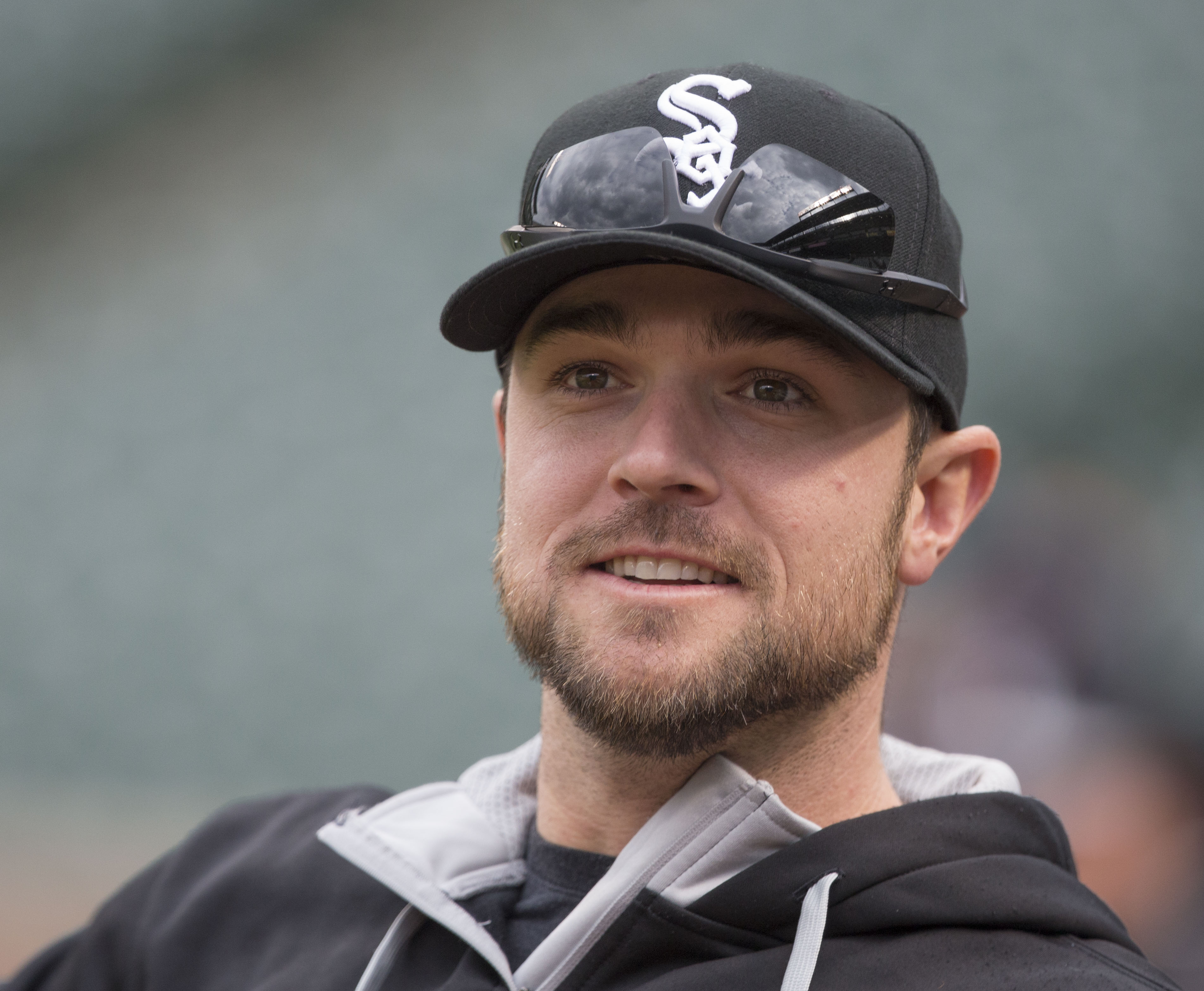
Robertson with the White Sox in 2015

After the 2014 season, Robertson became a free agent. He signed a four-year, $46 million contract with the Chicago White Sox. Robertson served as the White Sox closer during his tenure in Chicago. In his first season with the White Sox, Robertson compiled a 6–5 record with 34 saves (sixth in the AL), a 3.41 ERA, and 86 strikeouts in 63 1/3 innings, averaging 12.2 strikeouts per nine innings. He blew seven saves, but struck out 34.4% of batters and lowered his walk rate to a career-best 5.2%, averaging 1.8 walks per nine innings. He limited the first batters he faced to a .100 batting average, the lowest rate in both the AL and in White Sox history.

In his second season as the White Sox closer, Robertson earned 37 saves (fourth in the AL), pitching to a 5–3 record and 3.47 ERA while striking out 75 batters in 62 1/3 innings, averaging 10.8 strikeouts per nine innings. Robertson suffered seven blown saves, with his walk rate rising (4.62 BB/9).

Robertson pitched for the gold-medal-winning Team USA in the 2017 World Baseball Classic.

With the White Sox in rebuilding mode, Robertson became enshrouded in trade rumors during the offseason and regular season. Robertson was nearly traded to the Washington Nationals for Jesus Luzardo and Drew Ward; however, the deal was not completed due to disagreements regarding finances. In 2017 for the White Sox Robertson had a 4–2 record with 13 saves and a 2.70 ERA, and 47 strikeouts in 33 1/3 innings, averaging 12.8 strikeouts per nine innings, before getting traded to the Yankees.

=== New York Yankees (2017–2018) ===
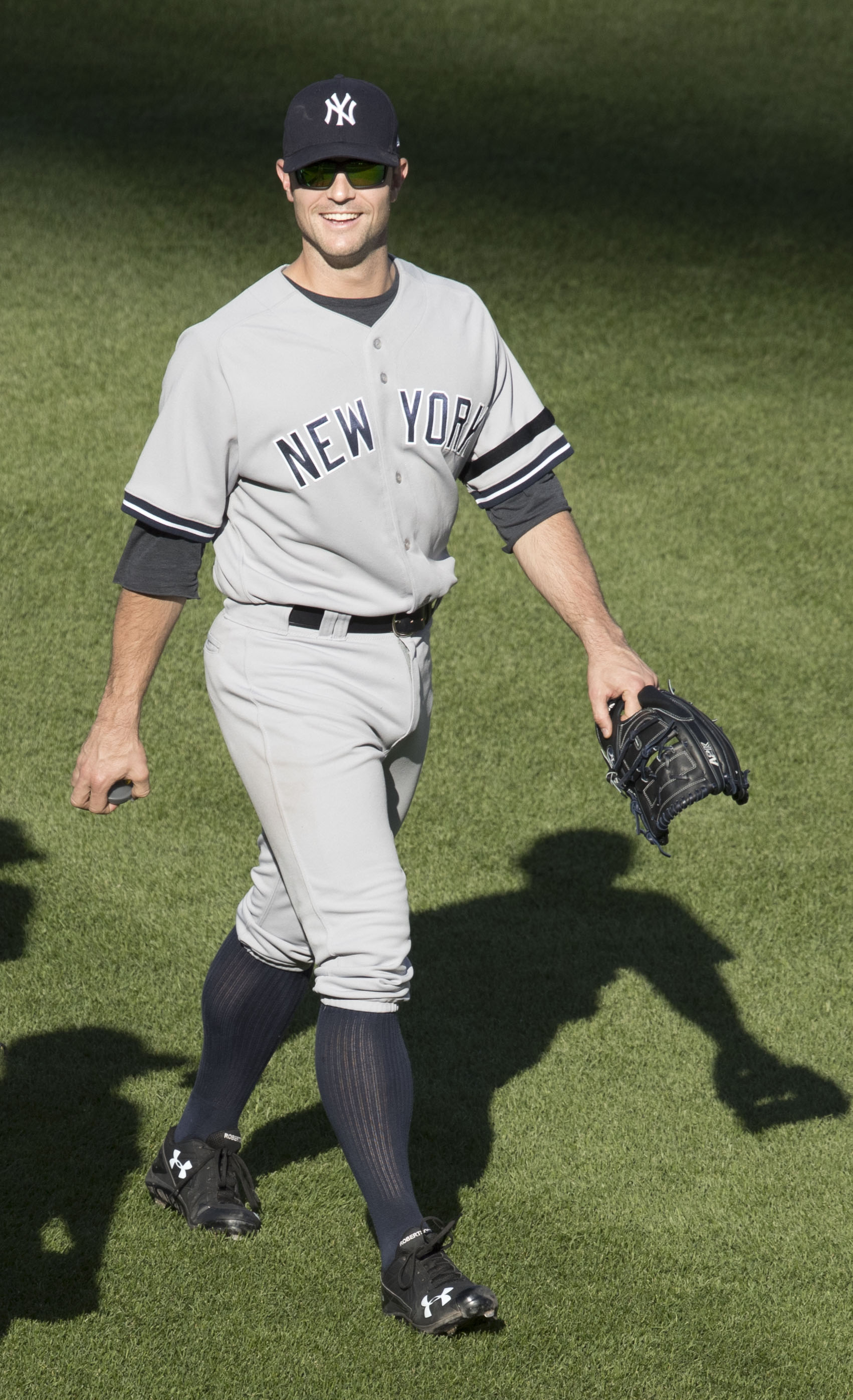
Robertson with the Yankees in 2017

On July 18, 2017, the White Sox traded Robertson, Todd Frazier, and Tommy Kahnle to the New York Yankees for Blake Rutherford, Tyler Clippard, Ian Clarkin, and Tito Polo. In his first appearance after the trade, Robertson struck out the side in the seventh inning to preserve a 5–1 lead against the Seattle Mariners. In the 2017 regular season for the Yankees, he was 5–0 with a save and a 1.03 ERA, and 51 strikeouts in 35 innings, averaging 13.1 strikeouts per nine innings.

In the 2017 American League Wild Card Game, Robertson set career post-season single-game highs in innings pitched, with 3 1/3, and pitches thrown, with 52. He allowed no runs and earned the win.

In 2018, Robertson was 8–3 with five saves, 21 holds (tied for eighth in the AL), and a 3.23 ERA, and 91 strikeouts in a career-high 69 2/3 innings, averaging 11.8 strikeouts per nine innings. His WHIP ranked seventh among AL relievers who pitched at least 60 innings. Batters hit .183 against Robertson. Left-handed batters hit .176 with a .240 on-base percentage against him; both in the top eight among pitchers who faced 130 or more lefties. Pitching against the number 3 and 4 hitters in opposing lineups, he held them to a batting average of .074, as they were 4-for-54 with 22 strikeouts.

=== Philadelphia Phillies (2019–2020) ===
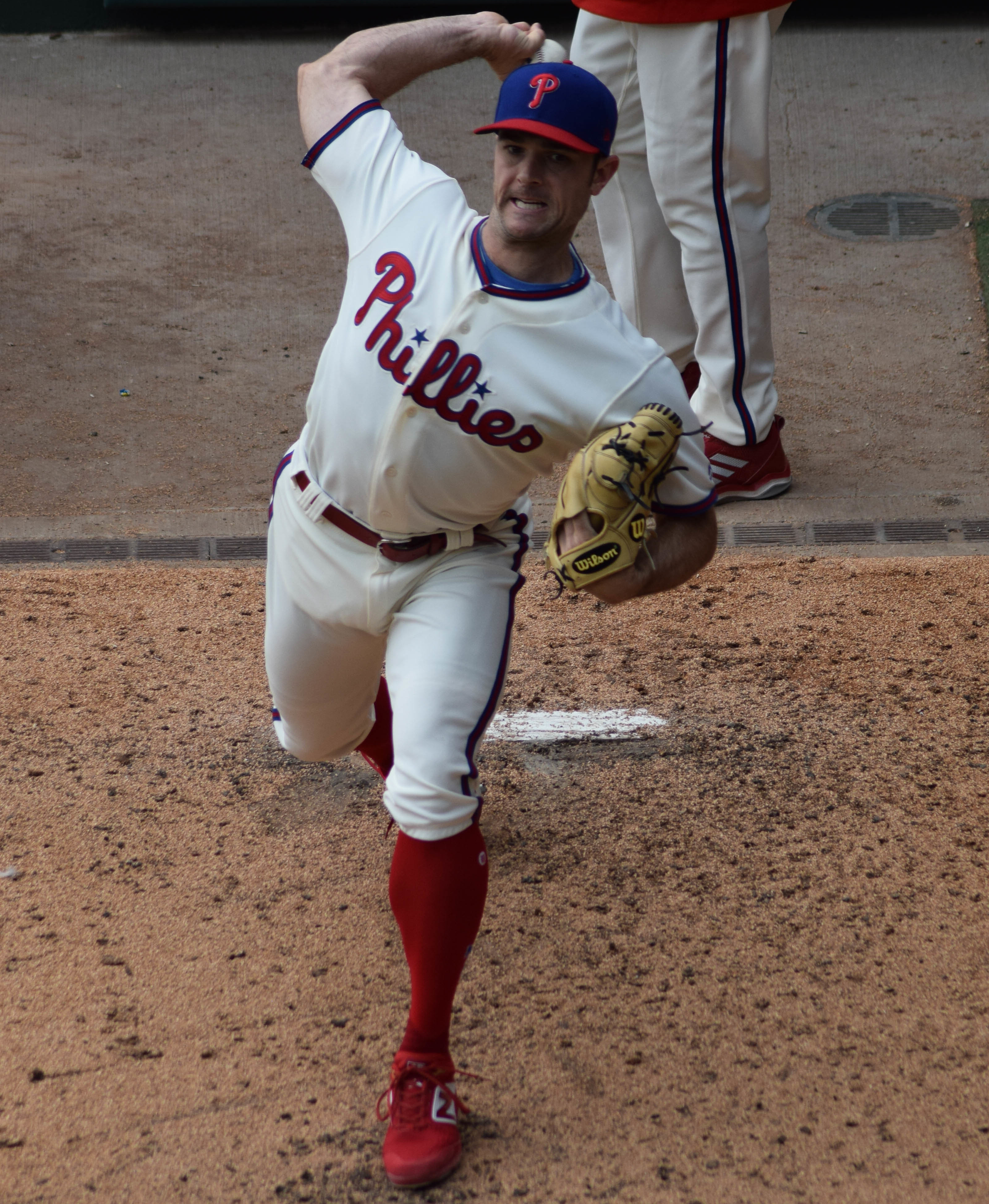
Robertson with the Phillies in 2019

As a free agent, Robertson self-negotiated and signed a two-year, $23 million contract, which included a third-year $12 million club option and $2 million buyout, with the Philadelphia Phillies on January 3, 2019. He donated one percent of his salary to the Phillies' charity fund.

Robertson made his Phillies pitching debut on March 28, 2019, at Citizens Bank Park, against the visiting Atlanta Braves. In 2019, he did not appear in a game after April 14 due to a Grade 1 flexor strain in his pitching elbow; it was determined later that it required season-ending Tommy John surgery. In 2019, he was 0–1 with a 5.40 ERA, pitching 6 2/3 innings in seven games. Robertson underwent surgery on August 17, 2019.

On August 28, 2020, Robertson suffered a setback during his recovery from Tommy John surgery and was immediately shut down from throwing, effectively ending his season without making an appearance. His option was bought out after the season, making him a free agent.

=== High Point Rockers and Tampa Bay Rays (2021) ===
On July 12, 2021, Robertson signed with the High Point Rockers of the Atlantic League of Professional Baseball to help prepare for the 2020 Summer Olympics (contested in 2021). He pitched with the team from July 13 to 15, earning a win and not allowing a run in two appearances out of the bullpen.

Following the Olympics, Robertson signed with the Tampa Bay Rays on August 16. Robertson made his major league season debut on September 1, with the Rays. In 12 appearances for Tampa Bay, he recorded a 4.50 ERA with 16 strikeouts over 12 innings of work.

=== Chicago Cubs (2022) ===
On March 16, 2022, Robertson signed a one-year contract with the Chicago Cubs. On June 22, Robertson appeared at bat for the first time in his MLB career. Robertson achieved this milestone in his 696th career game, borrowing gear from his teammates. Though he struck out against the Pittsburgh Pirates’ Diego Castillo, he was quoted as saying that the experience was a "dream come true”. In 36 games with the Cubs, Robertson went 3–0 with a 2.23 ERA and 14 saves in 40 1/3 innings pitched.

=== Philadelphia Phillies (2022) ===
On August 2, 2022, the Cubs traded Robertson to the Philadelphia Phillies in exchange for pitcher Ben Brown. In 22 games with the Phillies, Robertson went 1–3 with a 2.70 ERA and six saves in 23 1/3 innings. He also struck out 30 batters. The Phillies advanced to the 2022 World Series, where Robertson earned a save in an extra-inning, 6–5 victory in Game 1 over the Houston Astros. The Phillies would go on to lose to the Astros in six games.

=== New York Mets (2023) ===
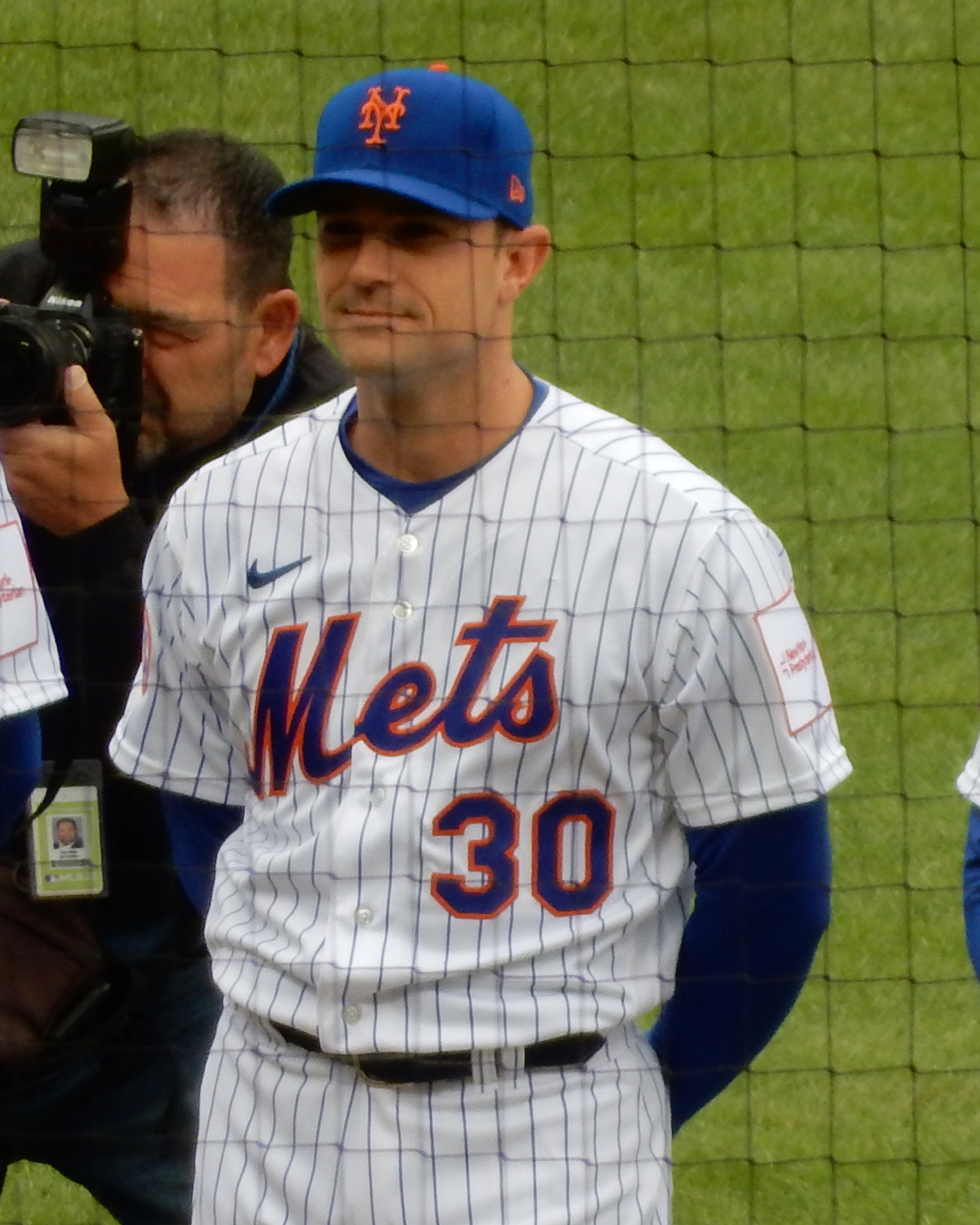
Robertson with the Mets in 2023

On December 9, 2022, Robertson signed a one-year, $10 million contract with the New York Mets. On May 12, 2023, he recorded the 1,000th strikeout of his MLB career, becoming just the 14th relief pitcher to reach that milestone. In 40 games for the Mets, Robertson went 4–2 with a 2.05 ERA and 48 strikeouts in 44 innings pitched.

=== Miami Marlins (2023) ===
On July 28, 2023, the Mets traded Robertson to the Miami Marlins in exchange for prospects Ronald Hernández and Marco Vargas. In 22 games for Miami, Robertson went 2–4 with four saves and struggled to a 5.06 ERA with 30 strikeouts in 21^{1}/_{3} innings pitched. He became a free agent following the season.

=== Texas Rangers (2024) ===
On January 26, 2024, Robertson signed a one-year contract with the Texas Rangers including a mutual option for the 2025 season. In 68 games for Texas, he went 3–4 and posted a 3.00 ERA with 99 strikeouts in 72 innings pitched. On November 2, he declined his share of the mutual option and became a free agent.

=== Philadelphia Phillies (2025) ===
On July 21, 2025, Robertson signed a prorated one-year, $16 million contract with the Philadelphia Phillies. For the season, Robertson amassed a 2–0 record with a 4.08 ERA and two saves in 20 appearances for the Phillies.

=== Retirement ===
On January 30, 2026, Robertson announced his retirement after 17 seasons in MLB.

Robertson retired with a 68–46 career record, a 2.93 ERA, 179 saves, and 1,176 strikeouts. He is one of 12 pitchers in American League history to appear in 60 games in nine consecutive seasons. He was also the last remaining active former Yankee on the 2009 World Series roster.

== International career ==
Robertson played for the champion United States national baseball team at the 2017 World Baseball Classic, getting the final outs against Puerto Rico in the gold medal game.

In May 2021, Robertson was named to the roster of the national team for qualifying for baseball at the 2020 Summer Olympics. After the team qualified, he was named to the Olympics roster on July 2. The team went on to win silver, falling to Japan in the gold-medal game.

== Pitching style ==
With an overhand delivery, Robertson typically threw his four-seam fastball at 92–93 miles per hour (148–150 km/h). Robertson's main off-speed pitch was a curveball in the low 80s. Infrequently, he threw a circle changeup to left-handed hitters in the mid-high 80s. Although Robertson's fastball speed was not unusually high, his long stride toward home plate during his delivery appeared to "add" 2 miles per hour (3.2 km/h) to his fastball by shortening the ball's time in flight. His fastball also had a "natural cut" to it, making it appear as if he was throwing a cut fastball.

Robertson always had a high walk rate (about one every two to three innings over his career). However, his high walk rate was mitigated by an outstanding strikeout rate. His high strikeout rate proved useful in critical late-inning situations. In 2011, Robertson struck out 14 of the 19 hitters he faced with the bases loaded and allowed only one hit. His ability to get out of jams earned him the nickname "Houdini".

== High Socks for Hope ==
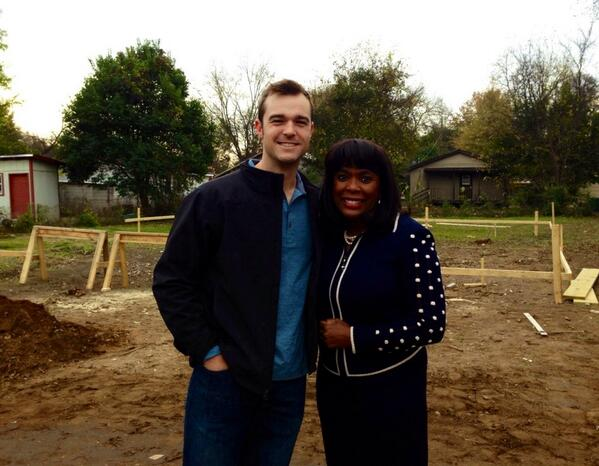
Robertson and U.S. Rep. Terri Sewell at a Habitat for Humanity project in Tuscaloosa, Alabama, in 2013

Robertson and his wife started a charitable foundation called "High Socks for Hope" to help the victims of Robertson's hometown of Tuscaloosa, Alabama, deal with the tornado strikes in 2011. Robertson agreed to donate $100 for every strikeout he recorded in the season. For his work, Robertson was nominated for the 2011 Marvin Miller Man of the Year Award. Following the death of his former White Sox teammate Daniel Webb, Robertson set up a fundraiser for Webb's family through High Socks for Hope.

In February 2018, Robertson was honored with the Thurman Munson Award for his work with High Socks for Hope.

== Personal life ==
Robertson married Erin Cronin in 2009. They have three children: Luke (born in August 2012), Violet (born in July 2017), and Rhett (born in March 2022). The family resides in Barrington, Rhode Island.

Robertson's brother, Connor, played in MLB for the Oakland Athletics and the Arizona Diamondbacks.

== See also ==
- List of baseball players who underwent Tommy John surgery
- List of Major League Baseball career games finished leaders
- List of Major League Baseball career saves leaders
