= Tuscaloosa City Schools =

School district in Alabama

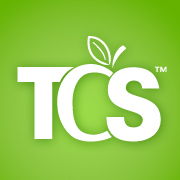

Address
- 1210 21st Avenue Alabama Tuscaloosa, Alabama, 35401; United States

District information
- Type: Public
- Grades: Pre K-12
- Superintendent: Dr. Michael J. Daria
- Schools: 23

Students and staff
- Students: 10,500
- Staff: 1,300

Other information
- Website: tuscaloosacityschools.com

Tuscaloosa City Schools is a public school district headquartered in Tuscaloosa, Alabama, United States. The district's boundaries include almost all of the city limits of Tuscaloosa.

There are approximately 10,000 students enrolled in Tuscaloosa City Schools. The Tuscaloosa City Schools provides instruction to more than 10,000 Pre-Kindergarten through 12th grade students throughout metropolitan Tuscaloosa, Alabama. Twenty-three schools comprise the district, including 12 elementary schools, 5 middle schools, 3 high schools, and 3 campuses dedicated to specialty education: one for students with special needs and those receiving alternative education, a school for students studying performing arts, and a career technical facility for grades 9 – 12.

The system has a checkered past regarding integration following the Brown v. Board decision. After this integration, forced by a court order in 1979, the system created one "mega-high school," Central High School, where all the students in the city attended. However, in the early to mid-1990s opposition from parents and lawmakers in Tuscaloosa caused the system to create a proposition to return to "neighborhood schools." This proposition was granted in 1995 with the creation of Rock Quarry Elementary School, and continued with the creation of Paul W. Bryant High School and Northridge High School in 2000.

== Before integration ==
In 1884 the municipal government established the district, which had 247 white students and 173 black students in its first year. Over time, two high schools developed for the city. Tuscaloosa High School was for the White students and Druid High School was for the Black students. The schools remained segregated racially after Brown v. Board of Education. In the segregated Druid High School, students would receive hand-me-down textbooks from the white Tuscaloosa High School, which would then cause them to fall behind academically to their white counterparts. In 1975 the NAACP Legal Defense Fund and the U.S. Department of Justice started an effort to make Tuscaloosa schools racially integrated. In 1979 a desegregation agreement was instituted by a federal judge requiring the district to have a single high school, Central High School when it previously had two; the agreement also meant the district reorganized the middle school system to have three middle schools.

== Integration of the School System ==
After the integration of the Tuscaloosa City School System, Central High School and its students won many awards both academically and athletically. The school “snatched up National Merit Scholarships and math-competition victories just as readily as it won trophies in football, track, golf.” Many students enjoyed the successes of Central High School, regardless of their race. The current mayor of Tuscaloosa, Walt Maddox, who graduated from Central High School, said that Central prepared students for the "real world" because of how diverse its student population was. However, former City School Board Member John Gordon argued that Central was only a success because of its top students and they were carrying the rest of the student population along statistically. He argues that the separation of the "mega high school" exposed this weakness in the school system and that it needed to be addressed.

== Legal Battles ==
White students made up the majority of the district's students around 1979. White flight began to occur towards Tuscaloosa County Schools and majority-white private schools so that in 1994 white students made up less than 33% of the total students. Between 1995 and 2000, white enrollment in the city schools went down 21%. The district had 10,300 students in 1995. Around the late 1980s/early 1990s Saturn chose not to locate a plant in Tuscaloosa because of the performance of the public schools, and by 1993 the city leadership wanted Mercedes-Benz to build a plant there. Influential politicians and influential people privately wished to create some majority-white schools fearing that the remaining white population would otherwise leave. The leaders made public statements that they wished to remove the desegregation order since it required the school system to get approval from the court for repairs and because not having neighborhood schools reduced its prestige.

The district proposed establishing a new elementary school in the majority-white Rock Quarry area in 1993, and the court granted this action in 1995; the district did this to check if the federal court system, which was becoming increasingly conservative, would be pliable to lifting the court order. With the new school established, the district then asked for the entire desegregation order to be removed. To convince black leaders to appear at the federal hearings so they could give support to ending the desegregation order, white leaders suggested a quid pro quo of building new schools in black areas.

Judge Sharon Blackburn released the district from its desegregation agreement in 1998. The district board voted to reorganize the middle schools into four in 1999. In August 2000 they voted to establish two new high schools and carve out three attendance zones, and Central High had a much smaller attendance zone serving a majority black student body, while the other two schools, had whiter student bodies. The performance of Central High School drastically declined after the change.

== Return to "Neighborhood Schools" ==
In a report released by the Tuscaloosa City School System in 2000, they addressed concerns that moving the "mega" high school into three separate schools would create a segregated school system featuring an "all-black" high school. The report states, "Thus, having a nearly all-black high school could be seen as a temporary expedient toward a future fully integrated system." However, this temporary expedient seems to have become a permanent one.

Tuscaloosa officials at the time stated about half of the students of Rock Quarry Elementary School would be White and the other half would be Black. Initially, its student body was 24% Black, and by 2014 it was 9% Black. It was one of the schools in the district with the highest student performance metrics. As of 2024, the student body is 72.7% White and 9.8% Black, with a minority enrollment of 27.3%.

In 2007 district officials felt alarmed as 22% of the total number of students were white, and a hotly-debated proposal to require more students to return to attendance zones was raised. After the association of the University of Alabama-area historic district asked the board members to consider assigning its area to majority-white schools, even though majority-black schools were closer, the board granted their request one day later, on May 3, 2007, when it voted 5–3 to establish the plan, with the three no votes being two black board members and Virginia Powell, a white board member who held the seat of the district including the university area.

Paul McKendrick became superintendent in 2011. Dr. Mike Daria became superintendent in 2016. In 2023, he was recognized as the superintendent of year for the State of Alabama.

Former Student Testimonials

"Going to Northridge was bittersweet for me. It did seem like we were doing something new, but we were also leaving behind this tradition." - Delia Steverson, Northridge Class of 2005, on leaving Central for the newly built Northridge High School.

"It's like the school spirit was gone as well. It wasn't the same. It wasn't Central no more." - Deontay Wilder, Central Class of 2004, on how Central changed after the split.

== Demographics ==
Central High School has a 95% minority enrollment, 89.5% being black and 5% being white, in 2024. In comparison, Northridge High School has a 55.6% white enrollment and 31.6% black enrollment, with 44.4% of enrollment being minority. Finally, the enrollment at Paul W. Bryant High School is 86.3% black, 6.6% Hispanic, and 5.2% white, totaling their minority enrollment to 94.8%.

== Schools ==
=== High schools ===
- Central High School
- Northridge High School
- Paul W. Bryant High School

Former:

- Druid High School (for black students)
- Tuscaloosa High School (for white students)

=== Middle schools ===
- Eastwood Middle School
- Northridge Middle School
- The Alberta School of Performing Arts (PreK-8)
- Tuscaloosa Magnet Schools—Middle
- Westlawn Middle School

=== Elementary schools ===
- Arcadia Elementary School
- Central Elementary School
- Martin Luther King Jr. Elementary School
- Oakdale Elementary School
- Rock Quarry Elementary School
  - Tuscaloosa district officials proposed establishing the school and asking federal officials to allow them to do so, in 1993, as a way of seeing if the federal courts were pliable to lifting the whole desegregation order. Judge Blackburn accepted the formation of the school in 1995.
- Skyland Elementary School
- Southview Elementary School
- Tuscaloosa Magnet Schools—Elementary
- University Place Elementary School
- Verner Elementary School
- Woodland Forrest Elementary School

=== Other campuses ===
- New Heights Community Resource Center
- The Alberta School of Performing Arts
- Tuscaloosa Career & Technology Academy

== Priority Schools ==
In 2023, Alabama changed their school rankings from "failing" to "priority" schools, which includes schools that make a "D" or "F" on their school report card for that year. If a student attends a "priority" school, they have the option to transfer to a "C" school either inside or outside the district they attend, or they can seek a tax credit scholarship to attend a participating nonpublic school. In 2023, there were 206 "priority" schools, in which 4 came from the Tuscaloosa City School System. These four include: Woodland Forest Elementary School, Southview Elementary School, Westlawn Middle School, and Central High School.

== See also ==
- List of school districts in Alabama
