= Tuscaloosa County School System =

School district in Alabama

Tuscaloosa County School System is a public school district headquartered in Tuscaloosa, Alabama, United States. The district's boundaries parallel that of the county of Tuscaloosa, except that they do not include the City of Tuscaloosa proper, which is served by Tuscaloosa City Schools.

Since 2020, the Superintendent is Dr. Keri Johnson.

== Schools ==
=== High schools ===
- Brookwood High School
- Hillcrest High School
- Holt High School
- Northside High School
- Sipsey Valley High School
- Tuscaloosa County High School

=== Intermediate Schools ===
- Collins-Riverside Intermediate
- Northport Intermediate

=== Middle schools ===
- Brookwood Middle School
- Davis Emerson Middle School
- Duncanville Middle School
- Echols Middle School
- Hillcrest Middle School
- Northside Middle School
- Sipsey Valley Middle School

=== Elementary schools ===
- Big Sandy Elementary School
- Brookwood Elementary School
- Buhl Elementary School
- Cottondale Elementary School
- Crestmont Elementary School
- Englewood Elementary School
- Faucett-Vestavia Elementary School
- Flatwoods Elementary School
- Holt Elementary School
- Huntington Place Elementary School
- Lake View Elementary School
- Matthews Elementary School
- Maxwell Elementary School
- Myrtlewood Elementary School
- Northport Elementary School
- Vance Elementary School
- Walker Elementary School
- Westwood Elementary School

== Other campuses ==
- Holt Classic
- Lloyd Wood Education Center (Sprayberry Education Center)

== See also ==
- List of school districts in Alabama
- Tuscaloosa City Schools
