= Paul W. Bryant High School =

Public school in Tuscaloosa, Alabama, US

Location
- 6315 Mary Harmon Bryant Drive; Tuscaloosa, Alabama 35453; United States
- 33°9′28″N 87°27′13″W

Information
- Type: Public
- School district: Tuscaloosa City Schools
- Superintendent: Mike Daria
- CEEB code: 010767
- Principal: Eric Hines
- Teaching staff: 55.50 (FTE)
- Grades: 9–12
- Enrollment: 1,072 (2023-2024)
- Student to teacher ratio: 19.32
- Colors: Navy Blue, Vegas Gold, and White
- Mascot: Stampy The Elephant
- Website: bryant.tuscaloosacityschools.com

Paul W. Bryant High School serves grades 9 through 12 and is located in Tuscaloosa, Alabama, forming part of the Tuscaloosa City Schools. The school is named after former Alabama Crimson Tide football head coach Paul William "Bear" Bryant. The school competes as part of the Alabama High School Athletic Association in Region 4 of the 6A division.

== History ==
With the 1999 lifting of the desegregation order that resulted in the creation of Central High School in 1979, the School Board began exploring the option to construct three new high schools to replace Central. By the early 2000s (decade), Tuscaloosa City Schools announced that three new high schools would be constructed that would become Bryant, Northridge and a new Central High School. By September 2001, the board would award construction contracts totaling $100 million to implement the Five-Year Facilities Plan. Costing $31.5 million to complete, the school would celebrate its ribbon-cutting on August 24, 2003, with U.S. Representative Artur Davis delivering the keynote address. As of the 2018-19 school year, the school is not completely segregated, at just 92% Black.

=== Naming ===
In January 2002, the Tuscaloosa City Schools School Board voted to name the school after Alabama Crimson Tide football head coach Paul William "Bear" Bryant. The name was selected after being suggested by a resident during a community meeting regarding the new school. Originally, the mascot was to be the "Bears" playing on the famous nickname of Paul Bryant. However, that option was ruled out because the old Tuscaloosa High had been nicknamed the Black Bears, and a 1970s court order relating to the consolidation of Druid High with Tuscaloosa High stated that no new school in Tuscaloosa may take a nickname used by any of the former segregated schools. Additionally, the name "Titans"—voted on by students of schools that would feed into Bryant—was rejected because Holy Spirit High School's teams were already named the Titans.

With the rejection of "Bears" and "Titans," popular sentiment was in favor of using "Stampede" as a mascot. According to PTA president Paul Lightsey, anyone who heard the school's name would expect to see an elephant as the mascot even if the school opted not to use Alabama's colors of red and white. Due to concerns about copyright issues, "Huskies" was chosen as an interim name. However, after Alabama lifted its objections to Bryant High using an elephant mascot, "Stampede" was ultimately chosen as the mascot for the school.

== Academics ==
Paul W. Bryant has a program offered to junior and seniors called Co-Op that provides students with the technical and hands on experience of the work force while in school. In 2018-19, 18% of students achieved proficiency in mathematics, and 22% in reading, both lower than even the Alabama state average.

== Varsity sports ==
Paul W. Bryant High School currently fields a varsity team in nine men's and eight women's sports. They are:

Men's sports

- Baseball
- Basketball
- Cross country
- Football
- Soccer
- Tennis
- Track and Field

Women's sports

- Basketball
- Cross country
- Soccer
- Softball
- Tennis
- Track and field
- Volleyball

== Notable alumni ==
- David Robertson – MLB pitcher
- Seth Williams – NFL wide receiver
- Lawrence Wilson – NFL linebacker
