= Central High School (Tuscaloosa, Alabama) =

Location
- 905 15th Street; Tuscaloosa, Alabama 35401; United States; 33°11′53″N 87°32′58″W

Information
- School type: Public, high school
- Founded: 1979 (47 years ago)
- School board: Tuscaloosa City Board of Education
- School district: Tuscaloosa City Schools
- Superintendent: Mike Daria
- CEEB code: 012690
- Principal: Thomas E. Jones
- Staff: 44.50 (FTE)
- Grades: 9–12
- Enrollment: 796 (2024–2025)
- Student to teacher ratio: 17.89
- Colors: Scarlet Red, Light Gray, and White
- Mascot: Falcons
- Website: chs.tuscaloosacityschools.com

Central High School is a high school in Tuscaloosa, Alabama, United States, enrolling grades 9 to 12. The school enrolls approximately 700 students, and is one of three traditional high schools in the Tuscaloosa City School District along with Paul W. Bryant High School and Northridge High School.

== History ==
Central High School was formed by the merger of Tuscaloosa High School and Druid High School in 1979 in response to a federal desegregation order. The school operated on two campuses, a west campus (Central West) made up of the former Druid High property and enrolling grades 9 and 10, and an east campus (Central East) on the former Tuscaloosa High grounds enrolling grades 11 and 12. The former mascots and school identities were discarded for a new one. Nikole Hanna-Jones of ProPublica stated that the consolidated school "emerged as a powerhouse that snatched up National Merit Scholarships and math-competition victories just as readily as it won trophies in football, track, golf."

In 1998, the desegregation order was lifted by judge Sharon Blackburn. In August 2000 the district board voted to establish two new high schools, and to reduce Central's attendance boundary to a majority black area. This led to what could be referred to as the re-segregation of Tuscaloosa high schools. Even though the high school students took a vote to rebuild Central as one high school encompassing all four grades, the city council decided that instead they would build three separate high schools. Two new high schools, Bryant and Northridge, were opened in 2003. That same year the population of white students at Central dropped to three people, ample evidence of said re-segregation. This separation also resulted in the Tuscaloosa city high school system, CHS especially, dropping from a 6A school leading to a decline in the city's athletic standing as a powerhouse among schools in the state of Alabama at the highest level. Central High declined academically after the opening of new schools.

In 2004, all Central students were transferred to Central West so that Central East could be demolished for a new Central High facility. The $31 million school building was completed in 2006 and houses all current Central students.

== Demographics ==
In 2014 the student body was 99% black, and 80% of the students were designated as low income.

== Curriculum ==
For a five year-period in the post-2000 era, no Advanced Placement (AP) classes were offered at Central High. The post-2000 school began offering physics classes in 2013.

Central High School offers the International Baccalaureate program for Tuscaloosa City Schools.

As of 2024, Central has the largest dual enrollment participation of any Tuscaloosa High School, with 43.4% of students in some sort of dual enrollment class.

== Student Publications ==
Central began publishing its student-led yearbook, The Falconer, when it opened in 1979.

For a period in the post-2000 era the school had no yearbook nor a school newspaper.

== Academic achievement ==
The State of Alabama designated it as a failing school in 2014, and was on the same list in 2017. The percentages of students in grades 9 and 10 in the 2015-2016 school year declared in "need of support" for subjects were, in the reading field, 68.6% of the total students and 44% of students taking the ACT, and in the mathematics field, almost 91% of the total students and about 65% of those taking the ACT. The school was removed from the failing schools list in 2019.

== Alumni ==
- Walter Maddox, politician
- David Robertson, baseball player
- Brandon Scott, actor
- Katy Sullivan, actress/Paralympic athlete
- Deontay Wilder, boxer
- Jimmy Hurst, baseball
