= Walt Maddox =

American politician (born 1972)

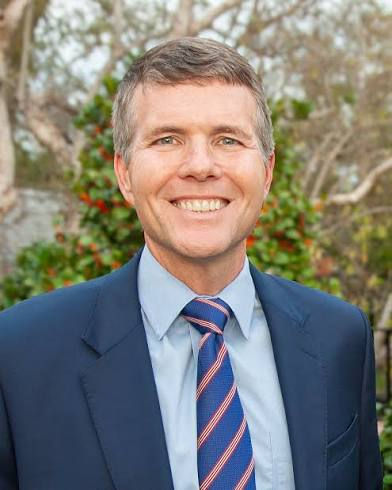
- Maddox in 2022

36th Mayor of Tuscaloosa
- Incumbent
- Assumed office October 3, 2005
- Preceded by: Al DuPont

Member of the Tuscaloosa City Council from the 6th district
- In office October 1, 2001 – October 3, 2005
- Preceded by: Clell Hobson
- Succeeded by: Bob Lundell

Personal details
- Born: Walter Thomas Maddox; December 27, 1972 (age 53) Tuscaloosa, Alabama, U.S.
- Party: Democratic
- Spouse(s): Robin Maddox (m. 1998; div. 2008) Stephanie Roberts (m. 2010)
- Children: 2
- Education: University of Alabama at Birmingham (BA, MPA)
- Website: Official website

Walter Thomas Maddox (born December 27, 1972) is an American politician who has served as the 36th mayor of Tuscaloosa, Alabama, since 2005. From 2001 to 2005, he served on the Tuscaloosa City Council and as executive director of personnel for Tuscaloosa City Schools. Maddox was a field director for the Alabama Education Association from 1996 to 2001.

Maddox was elected mayor of Tuscaloosa and has been reelected five times. In 2018, he was the Democratic nominee for governor of Alabama, losing to incumbent Republican Kay Ivey.

== Early life and career ==
Maddox was born and raised in Tuscaloosa, attended the Tuscaloosa City Schools, and graduated from Central High School in 1991. He attended the University of Alabama at Birmingham, where he was a four-year letter winner in football and received a bachelor's degree in political science and a Master's in Public Administration.

From 1996 to 2001, Maddox served as a field director for the Alabama Education Association. In 2001, he was appointed executive director of personnel for Tuscaloosa City Schools, serving until he was elected mayor. On August 28, 2001, Maddox was elected to the Tuscaloosa City Council, defeating incumbent Clell Hobson, 61% to 39%. He ran on a platform of education reform and crime reduction.

== Mayor of Tuscaloosa ==
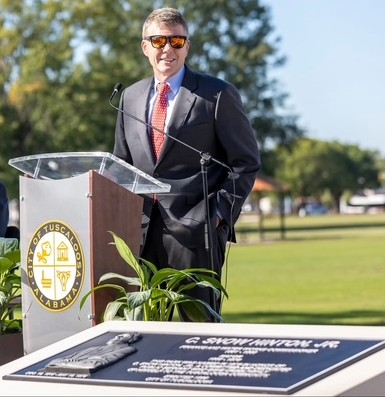
Mayor Maddox at Snow Hinton Park in 2024

In 2005, longtime Tuscaloosa mayor Al DuPont retired. Maddox was an underdog against former city councilman Sammy Watson. Maddox came in second place in the initial round of voting, receiving 31.1% to Watson's 38%. This forced a runoff on September 13, which Maddox won with 54% of the vote to Watson's 46%. Maddox was inaugurated on October 3 in front of Tuscaloosa City Hall.

On August 25, 2009, Maddox was reelected without opposition.

Maddox was reelected again without opposition on August 27, 2013. On November 4, he was sworn in for his third term as mayor.

For the first time since 2005, Maddox faced a challenger in the 2017 mayoral election. His opponent was the founder of the Urban Progressive Party, Stepfon Lewis. Maddox defeated Lewis with 89% of the vote to Lewis's 11%. He was sworn into his fourth term on May 22, 2017.

On March 2, 2021, Maddox was elected to his fifth term with 56% of the vote, defeating University of Alabama professor Serena Fortenberry and former University of Alabama football player Martin Houston.

Maddox won his sixth term with 87% of the vote on March 4, 2025. He defeated political newcomer Denson Ferrell II.

=== 2011 Tuscaloosa tornado ===
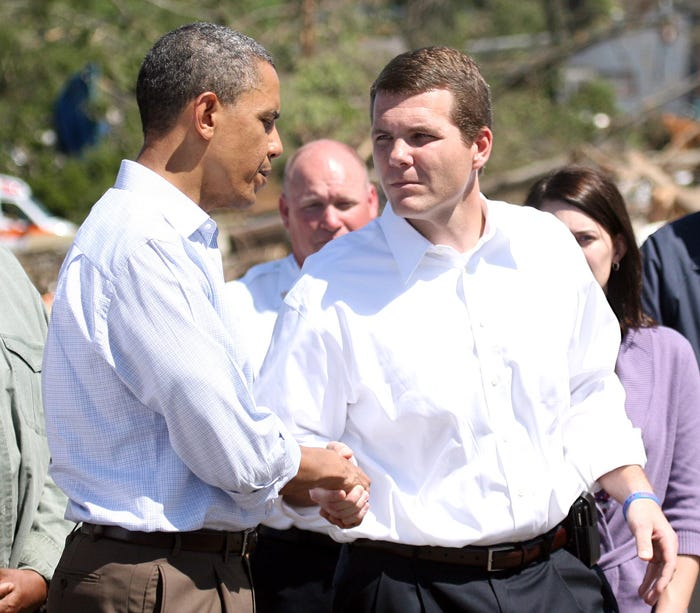
Mayor Maddox and President Obama surveying tornado damage in Tuscaloosa in April 2011.

On April 27, 2011, a large EF4 tornado struck Tuscaloosa and Birmingham, killing 44 people in Tuscaloosa County and inflicting $927 million in damage to the city. The tornado, part of the 2011 Super Outbreak, was the second significant tornado to affect the city that month, as an EF3 tornado struck a similar part of the city on April 15. On April 29, Maddox toured the April 27 tornado damage with public officials including President Barack Obama and Governor Robert J. Bentley.

The tornado destroyed 12% of the city; it severely damaged or destroyed approximately 5,300 homes and businesses. Maddox was widely praised for his leadership in the aftermath of the storm. The Wall Street Journal described the Tuscaloosa disaster response as an attempt to "courageously create a showpiece" of "unique neighborhoods that are healthy, safe, accessible, connected, and sustainable."

=== Municipal Leader of the Year ===
American City and County, a publication for local and state governmental officials, named Maddox Municipal Leader of the Year in 2012. One of more than 100 nominees across the country, Maddox was nominated by leaders at the University of Alabama, noting his work in the wake of the April 27, 2011 tornado. The application referenced his creation of a disaster plan, periodic training between different governmental entities, his creation of the Tuscaloosa Forward plan, which helped the city obtain grants and other funding needed during recovery, as well as the securing of adequate shelter and the disbursement of supplies at aid stations for victims.

=== Tuscaloosa 311 ===
In 2007, Maddox established Tuscaloosa 311 as a non-emergency call center connecting Tuscaloosa's people with their government. It helps residents submit service requests, get assistance with permits or licenses, find information on City events, or report a problem with any City services. The center was more successful than anticipated and has since had to expand its staff to accommodate call volume.

In 2024, Tuscaloosa 311 became the first nationally certified 311 center in Alabama.

=== ELEVATE Tuscaloosa ===
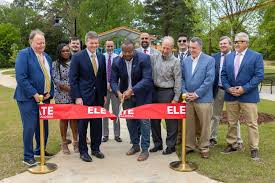
Mayor Maddox and colleagues at Springbrook Park

Elevate Tuscaloosa is a community investment initiative funded by a dedicated one-cent sales tax and supported by federal grants. Launched by Maddox in 2020, its mission is to enhance quality of life through strategic investments in education, cultural arts, tourism, parks, recreation and connectivity.

Key accomplishments include expanding dual-enrollment opportunities for high school students, funding pre-k and summer learning programs and supporting over 230 small businesses during the pandemic. Elevate has over $290 million budgeted for projects and initiatives and over $109 million matched through grants and fundraising.

=== Pre-K Initiative ===
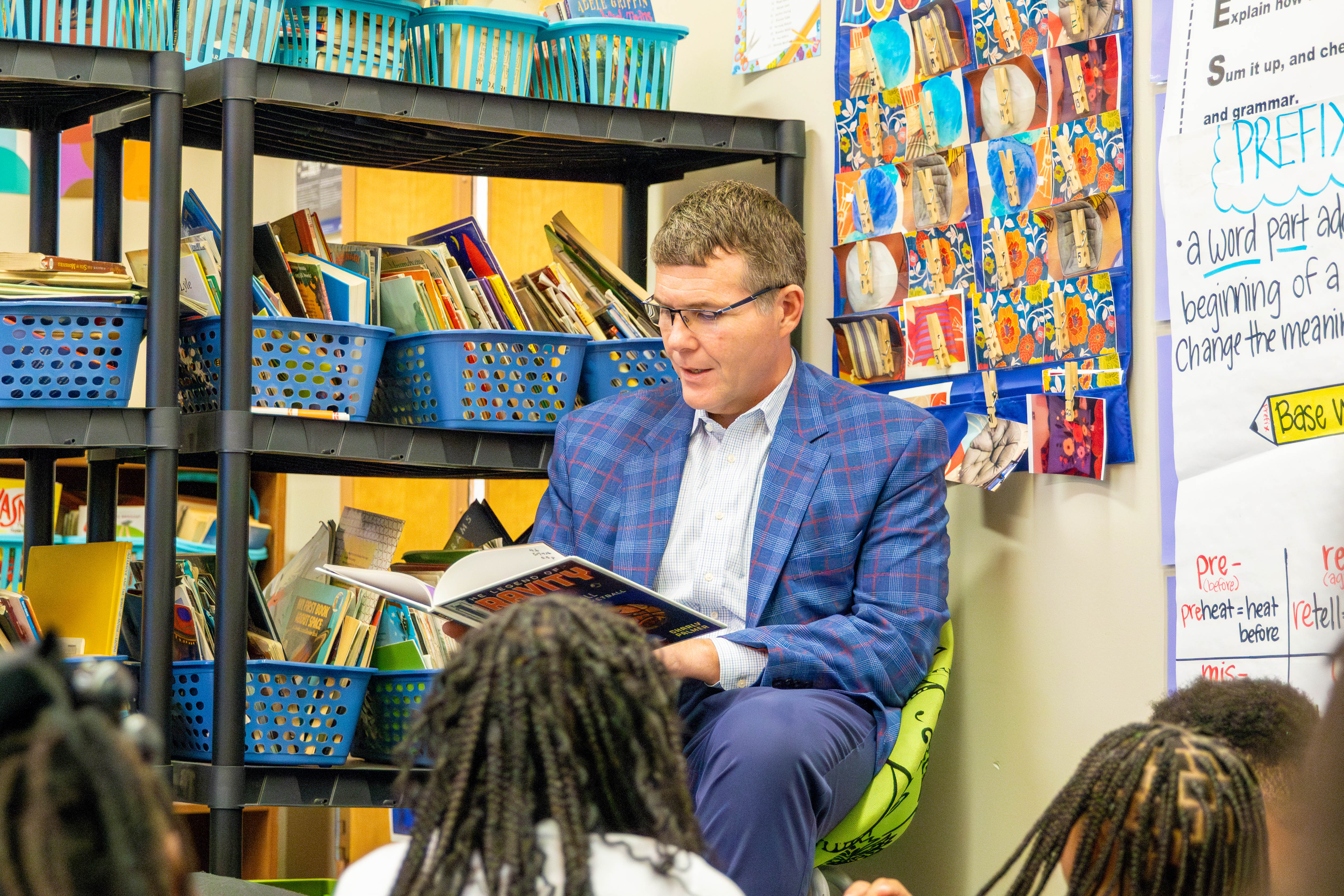
Mayor Maddox reading to students for Read Across America

During his first term, Maddox developed the Pre-K Task Force to investigate and plan the path to ensure all of Tuscaloosa's four-year-old children receive a quality pre-k education. He also created the annual Mayor's Cup, which has raised over $350,000 to go directly into the pre-k classrooms. The nationally recognized Tuscaloosa Pre-K Initiative is now the model for the state's pre-k program.

=== Harvard Kennedy School crisis leadership fellow ===
Maddox served as a senior fellow with the Program on Crisis Leadership at the Harvard University's Kennedy School of Government for over a decade. He was promoted to senior fellow in the program in August 2019, and partnered with the Bloomberg Harvard City Leadership Initiative's executive education courses to discuss lessons he learned during Tuscaloosa's tornado recovery efforts.

=== United States Conference of Mayors Appointments ===
In July 2025, Maddox was appointed by the United States Conference of Mayors (USCM) to serve as a member of the new Intergovernmental Emergency Management Task Force. The USCM is the official non-partisan organization of cities with populations of 30,000 or more. The Conference is a forum where mayors engage directly with the President and Congress on the most pressing issues of the day.

The Intergovernmental Emergency Management Task Force will focus the Conference's advocacy efforts regarding the federal government's responsibility to provide adequate funding and other resources to support response and recovery efforts that are beyond the capacity of state and local governments to fund.

In July 2026, the USCM appointed Maddox as Chair of the Mayors and Metro Universities Task Force and as Vice Chair for Philanthropy of the Public-Private Partnerships Task Force.

=== Saban Center ===
In August 2025, the City of Tuscaloosa held a groundbreaking ceremony for the Saban Center. A $120 million STEM and innovation hub, the Saban Center was launched under Maddox's administration. It is a public-private partnership designed to link science, discovery, and exploration through a regional collaboration of the State of Alabama, Nick and Terry Saban, the University of Alabama and many others. The campus will serve as a nexus for interactive STEM education, workforce preparation and community engagement. It will also serve as the future home of the Tuscaloosa Children's Theatre and IGNITE, formerly Children's Hands-On Museum.

The Saban Center is named in honor of Nick and Terry Saban, whose philanthropic foundation played a vital part in its establishment. The project aims to serve as a national prototype for experiential learning, arts and innovation.

=== SEC Mayors Alliance ===
At the 2026 South by Southwest conference in Austin, Texas, Maddox was named Chair for the SEC Mayors Alliance at their inaugural meeting. The Alliance will focus on three priorities uniquely aligning these cities: public safety, relationships with the universities in our cities and economic development.

== 2018 Alabama gubernatorial election ==
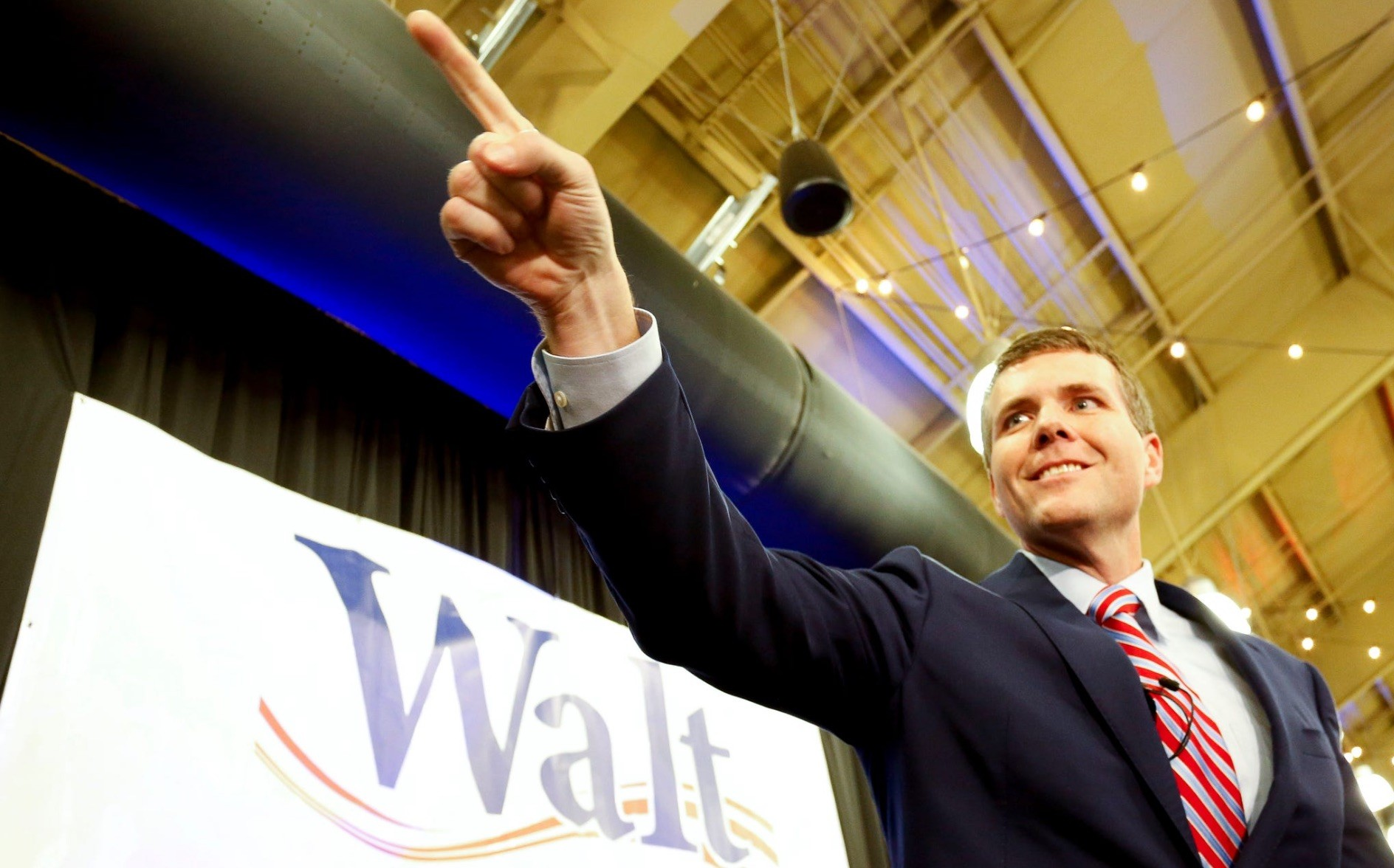
Maddox campaigning for governor in 2018

On October 5, 2017, Maddox announced his plans to run for governor of Alabama, saying Republican leadership had failed the state, which "still ranks near the bottom in every quality-of-life indicator from education to healthcare." He won the June 5 primary with 54.6% of the vote, defeating former Alabama Supreme Court Chief Justice Sue Bell Cobb. In November he lost to Republican incumbent governor Kay Ivey.

Maddox ran as a "pro-life," pro-Second Amendment candidate.

== Personal life ==
On December 27, 1998, Maddox married Robin Maddox, a realtor. After having a daughter together, they divorced in 2008. On June 26, 2010, Maddox married Stephanie Nicole Roberts. Their son was born in 2013.

== See also ==
- List of mayors of Tuscaloosa, Alabama

Political offices
Preceded by Al DuPont	Mayor of Tuscaloosa; 2005–present	Incumbent
Party political offices
Preceded by Parker Griffith	Democratic nominee for Governor of Alabama; 2018	Succeeded by Yolanda Flowers
