= West End Christian School hostage crisis =

1988 incident in Tuscaloosa, Alabama, US

Coordinates: 33.2042°N 87.5818°W

- Location: Tuscaloosa, Alabama, United States
- Date: February 2, 1988
- Target: West End Christian School
- Attack type: Hostage taking
- Deaths: 0
- Perpetrators: James L. Harvey, James Rhodes, Jr.

The West End Christian School hostage crisis occurred on February 2, 1988, when James L. Harvey took captive nearly 60 people, mostly children, inside the West End Christian School in Tuscaloosa, Alabama, United States. The siege came to an end when Harvey was shown a videotape made by Alabama Governor H. Guy Hunt in which the governor said that he would be granted a pardon and immunity. However, the promise was considered to have been written under duress, and thus carried no legal weight and was part of a ruse into getting him to surrender. After giving up his weapons, two pistols and a rifle, to authorities and preparing to lead the child hostages outside for what he believed would be a news conference, Harvey was wrestled to the ground by police and arrested.

Harvey's motives in committing the crime was to spread awareness of homelessness.

== Aftermath ==
Harvey was sentenced to life in prison plus 20 years. He is currently being held in the Limestone Correctional Facility.
