= DCH Regional Medical Center =

- Carraway Infirmary

Geography
- Location: West Alabama region., Alabama, Tuscaloosa, Alabama
- Coordinates: 33°12′24″N 87°32′5″W

Organisation
- Affiliated university: None
- Patron: None

Helipads
- Helipad: Yes

Links
- Other links: List of hospitals in Alabama

DCH Regional Medical Center, originally known as Druid City Hospital and generally referred to as DCH, is a public, not-for-profit hospital and medical complex located in Tuscaloosa, Alabama that serves the West Alabama region. DCH is operated by the DCH Health System, which also runs the Northport Medical Center and the Fayette Medical Center in Northport, Alabama and Fayette, Alabama, respectively. As of 2014, DCH employed 3,481 persons, making it the second highest employer in Tuscaloosa County.

== History ==
In 1916, a small medical clinic opened on Broad Street (now known as University Boulevard) to serve Tuscaloosa. The 12-bed Druid City Infirmary was quickly seen to be insufficient to serve the town's medical needs. With land donated by the University of Alabama, a bond issue and public subscriptions were used to fund a new hospital on a nearby site. Dubbed Druid City Hospital, it officially opened on March 25, 1923.

DCH has expanded and changed locations over the years. At the end of World War II, in 1946, it leased a portion of Northington General Hospital to serve its burgeoning patient population. Six years later, in 1952, it moved from Northington to its present site, 809 University Blvd. E. Its original space reverted to the University of Alabama and, in 2012, a renovated Russell Hall was constructed there.
