= Tuscaloosa, Alabama =

City in Alabama, United States

Tuscaloosa
- City
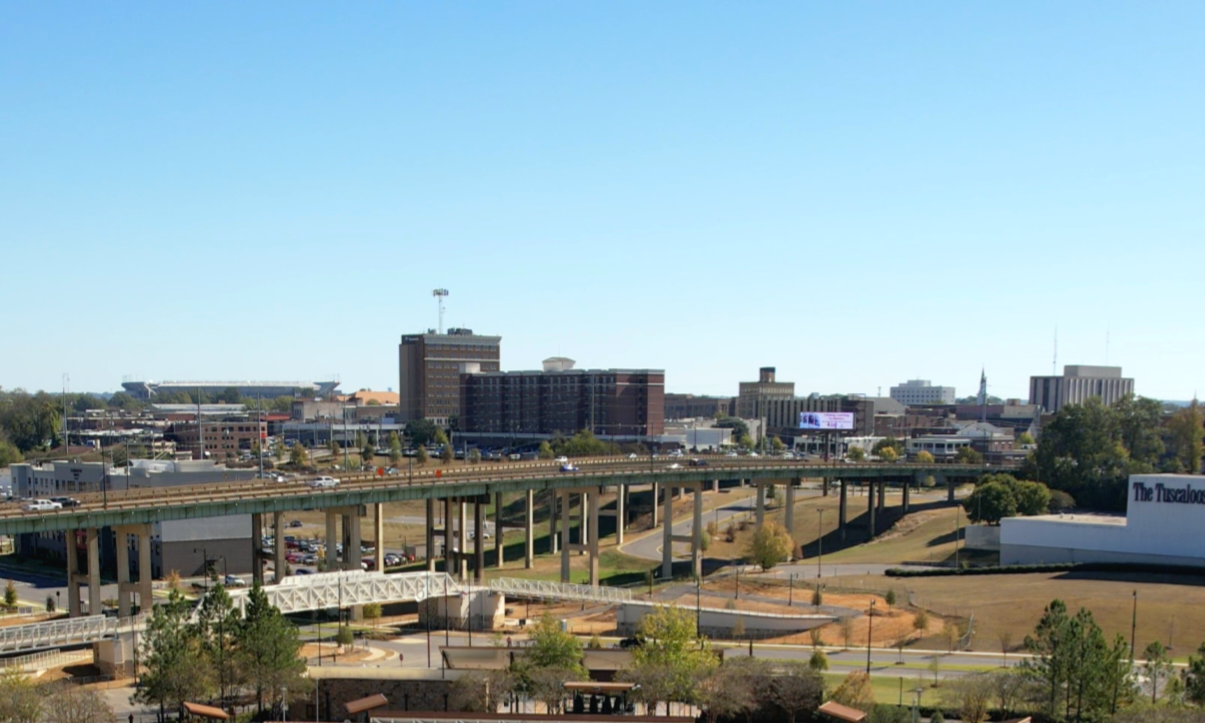
- View of Downtown Tuscaloosa from the amphitheater

- Flag Seal Logo
- Nicknames: Druid City, T-Town, City of Champions
- Motto: "Together we can build a bridge to the future."
- Location of Tuscaloosa in Tuscaloosa County, Alabama
- Coordinates: 33°16′35″N 87°28′10″W
- Country: United States
- State: Alabama
- County: Tuscaloosa
- Incorporated: December 13, 1819

Government
  - Type: Mayor-Council
  - Mayor: Walt Maddox (D)

Area
  - City: 72.22 sq mi (187.05 km^{2})
  - Land: 62.15 sq mi (160.97 km^{2})
  - Water: 10.07 sq mi (26.08 km^{2})
- Elevation: 190 ft (58 m)

Population (2020)
  - City: 99,600
  - Estimate (2023): 111,338 ▲
  - Rank: US: 280th AL: 5th
  - Density: 1,787/sq mi (689.9/km^{2})
  - Urban: 156,450 (US: 229th)
  - Urban density: 1,775/sq mi (685.2/km^{2})
  - Metro: 277,494 (US: 181st)
  - Metro density: 79.4/sq mi (30.67/km^{2})
- Time zone: UTC−6 (Central (CST))
  - Summer (DST): UTC−5 (CDT)
- ZIP Codes: 35401, 35402, 35403, 35404, 35405, 35406, 35407, 35486, 35487
- Area codes: 205 and 659
- FIPS code: 01-77256
- GNIS feature ID: 2405614
- Website: tuscaloosa.com

Tuscaloosa (/ˌtʌskəˈluːsə/ TUS-kə-LOO-sə) is a city in and the county seat of Tuscaloosa County in west-central Alabama, United States, on the Black Warrior River where the Gulf Coastal and Piedmont plains meet. Alabama's fifth-most populous city, the population was 99,600 at the 2020 census, and was estimated to be 114,288 in 2025. It was known as Tuskaloosa until the early 20th century. It is also known as "the Druid City" because of the numerous water oaks planted in its downtown streets since the 1840s.

Incorporated on December 13, 1819, it was named after Tuskaloosa, the chief of a band of Muskogean-speaking people defeated by the forces of Spanish explorer Hernando de Soto in 1540 in the Battle of Mabila, in what is now central Alabama. It served as Alabama's capital city from 1826 to 1846, where in 1846 it was moved to its present location in Montgomery.

Tuscaloosa is the regional center of industry, commerce, healthcare and education for the area of west-central Alabama known as West Alabama. It is the principal city of the Tuscaloosa Metropolitan Statistical Area, which includes Tuscaloosa, Hale and Pickens counties.

It is the home of the University of Alabama, Stillman College, and Shelton State Community College. While it attracted international attention when Mercedes-Benz announced on September 30, 1993, that it would build its first North American automotive assembly plant in Tuscaloosa County, the University of Alabama remains the city's dominant economic and cultural engine, making it a college town. City leaders adopted the moniker "The City of Champions" after the Alabama Crimson Tide football team won the College Football National Championship in their 2009, 2011, 2012, 2015, 2017 and 2020 seasons.

In 2008, Tuscaloosa hosted the USA Olympic Triathlon trials for the Beijing Games.

== History ==
Reportedly the name Tuscaloosa is a compound Choctaw Indian word; "tusko" meaning "warrior" and "loosa" meaning "black". The Black Warrior River flows through the north portion of the city. In 1809 Creek chief Occechemolta established a settlement at the falls of the river. (US-T125/Alabama: A Guide to the Deep South/p 244). County seat of Tuscaloosa County 1818 to 1822 and 1826 to the present. State capital from 1826 to 1846.

=== Native American ===
In 1828, Andrew Jackson was elected president of the United States. He had gained popularity when he defeated the Creek at the Battle of Horseshoe Bend in 1814, following victories in the War of 1812. He long proposed Indian removal to an Indian Territory to be established west of the Mississippi, to make land available in the Southeast for European-American settlement. Jackson abandoned the policy of his predecessors of treating different Indian groups as separate nations. Instead, he aggressively pursued plans to move all Indian tribes living east of the Mississippi River.

Following Congressional passage of the Indian Removal Act, in 1832 the Creek National Council signed the Treaty of Cusseta, ceding their remaining lands east of the Mississippi to the U.S., and accepting relocation to the Indian Territory. They had already been under pressure from new settlers encroaching on their territory. Most Muscogee-speaking peoples were removed to Indian Territory during the Trail of Tears in 1834, although some remained behind. Some Muscogee in Alabama live near Poarch Creek Reservation in Atmore (northeast of Mobile).

=== Statehood and origin of name ===
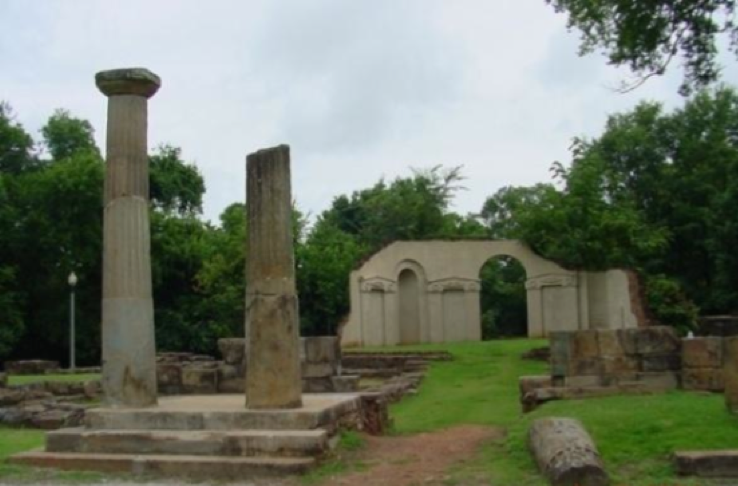
The ruins of the Alabama State Capitol in Tuscaloosa at Capitol Park. The building served as the home of a women's college until it burned down in 1923.

The pace of European settlement in the Southeast increased greatly after the War of 1812 and the Treaty of Fort Jackson and the subsequent availability of land previously settled by Native Americans. A small assortment of log cabins soon arose near the large Creek village at the fall line of the river, which the new settlers named in honor of the 16th-century Chief Tuskaloosa of a Muskogean-speaking tribe—combining the Choctaw words "tushka" or "tashka" ("warrior") and "lusa" ("black").

In 1817, Alabama became a territory. On December 13, 1819, the territorial legislature incorporated the town of Tuskaloosa, one day before Congress admitted Alabama to the Union as a U.S. state.

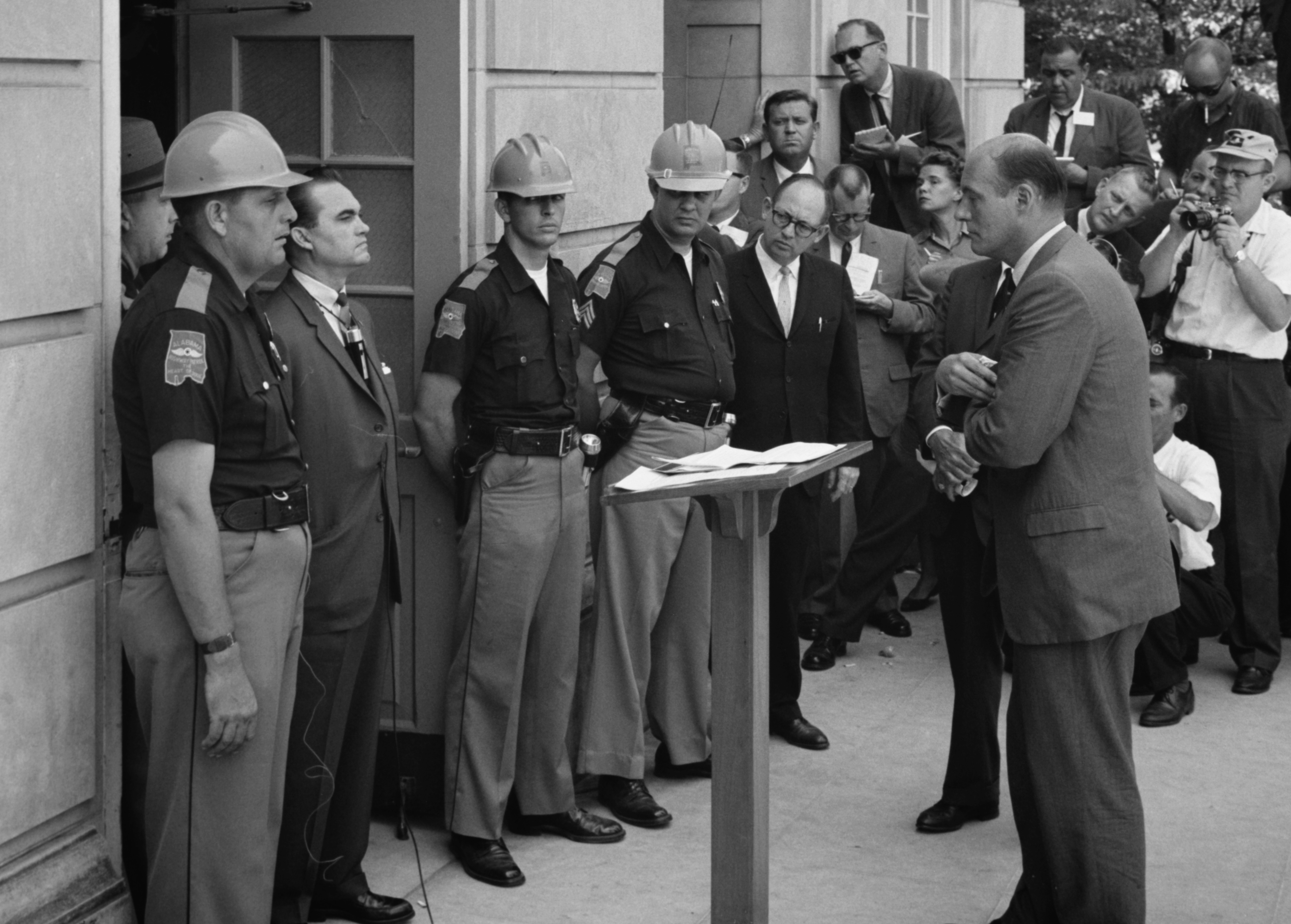
Wallace standing against desegregation while being confronted by Deputy U.S. Attorney General Nicholas Katzenbach at the University of Alabama in 1963

From 1826 to 1846, Tuskaloosa was the capital of Alabama. The State House was built at the corner of 6th Street and 28th Avenue (now the site of Capitol Park). In 1831, the University of Alabama was established and the town's population and economy grew rapidly, but the relocation of the capital to Montgomery caused a severe decline. The state legislature established Alabama State Hospital for the Insane (now Bryce Hospital) in Tuskaloosa in the 1850s, which helped restore the city's fortunes.

=== Civil War ===
During the Civil War following Alabama's secession from the Union, several thousand men from Tuscaloosa fought in the Confederate armies. During the last weeks of the War, the campus of the university was burned in a battle. The larger town was also damaged in the battle, and its White population suffered economically. Its Black population was emancipated from slavery.

In the 1890s the construction of a system of locks and dams on the Black Warrior River by the U.S. Army Corps of Engineers improved navigation to such an extent that Tuscaloosa was effectively connected to the Gulf Coast seaport of Mobile. This stimulated the economy and trade, and mining and metallurgical industries were developed in the region. By the onset of the 20th century, the growth of the University of Alabama and the mental health-care facilities in the city, along with a strong national economy, fueled a steady growth in Tuscaloosa which continued unabated for 100 years.

=== Civil rights movement ===
In the post World War II era, African Americans increased their activism to ensure their constitutional civil rights and challenged southern segregation in numerous ways. In 1952, Autherine Lucy was admitted to the university as a graduate student, but her admission was rescinded when authorities discovered she was not White. After three years of legal wrangling, Thurgood Marshall and the NAACP got a court order preventing the university from banning Lucy and another student based on race. The following year, Lucy enrolled as a graduate student in Library Science on February 3, 1956, becoming the first Black admitted to a White public school or university in the state. During her first day of class on February 6, students and others rioted on the campus, where a mob of more than a thousand students pelted the car in which she was taken to her classes. Death threats were made against her, and the university president's home was stoned. The riots were the most violent involving a pro-segregation demonstration since the landmark Brown v. Board of Education Supreme Court decision. After the riots, the university suspended Lucy from school, stating her own safety was a concern; it later expelled her on a technicality. She was active in civil rights for a time, but withdrew later that year. Decades later, after her expulsion was annulled by the university in 1988, Lucy re-enrolled and completed her M.S. in Education and graduated, together with her daughter, in 1992.

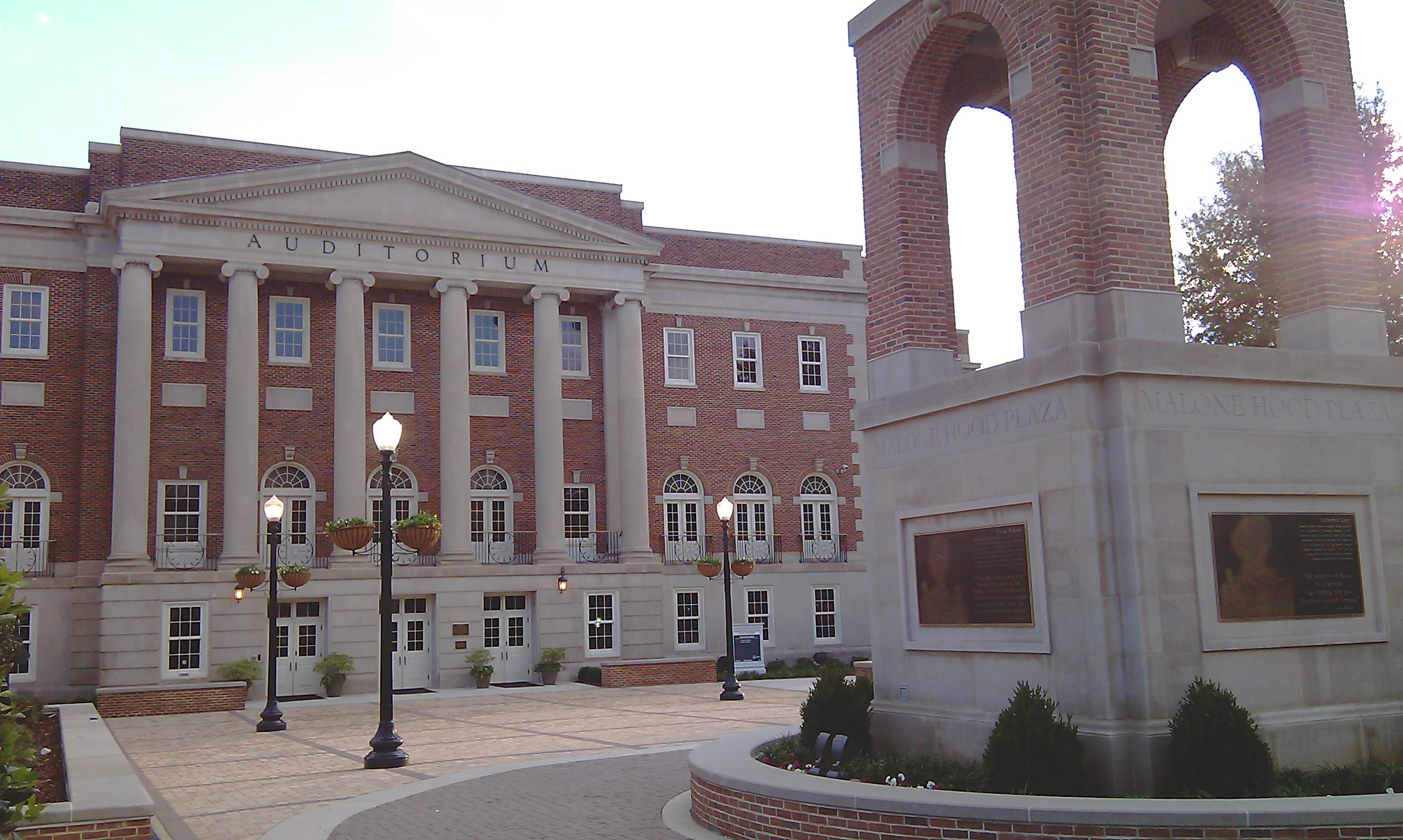
Foster Auditorium and Malone-Hood Plaza in 2010. Lucy Clock Tower is in the foreground.

On June 11, 1963, George Wallace, governor of Alabama, stood in front of the Foster Auditorium entrance at The University of Alabama in what became known as the Stand in the Schoolhouse Door in an attempt to stop desegregation of that institution by the enrollment of two African-American students, Vivian Malone and James Hood. He had created a challenge to federal orders, when confronted by US Deputy Attorney General Nicholas Katzenbach and federal marshals sent in by Attorney General Robert F. Kennedy, Wallace stepped aside. President John F. Kennedy had supported integration of the University of Alabama as well.

On June 9, 1964, in an event that later became known as Bloody Tuesday, a group of African-American Civil rights marchers were beaten, arrested and tear-gassed by police in Tuscaloosa while walking from the First African Baptist Church to the County Courthouse to protest against the segregated restrooms and drinking fountains of this public facility. Thirty-three people were sent to the hospital for treatment of injuries, and 94 were arrested. The events were not witnessed by outside journalists and had little influence outside the local community.

James Hood dropped out of the University of Alabama after two months. He later returned, and in 1997, received his Ph.D. in interdisciplinary studies. Malone persisted in her studies at the time and became the first Black American to graduate from the university. In 2000, the university granted her an honorary doctorate of Humane Letters. Later in his life, Governor Wallace apologized for his opposition at that time to racial integration.

In 2010, the university formally honored Lucy, Hood, and Malone by renaming the plaza in front of Foster Auditorium as Malone-Hood Plaza and erecting the Autherine Lucy Clock Tower in the plaza. In 2022, the university dedicated the home of the College of Education as Autherine Lucy Hall.

=== 2011 tornado ===
On April 27, 2011, Tuscaloosa was hit by a 1.5 mi (2.4 km) wide EF4 tornado that resulted in 64 deaths, more than 1,500 injuries, and massive devastation. Most of the deaths, 44, were in Tuscaloosa alone, with the rest being in Birmingham and surrounding suburbs. The tornado's top winds were estimated by the US National Weather Service at 190 mph (310 km/h). Officials at DCH Regional Medical alone reported treating more than 1,000 injured people in the tornado aftermath. Officials reported dozens of unaccompanied minors being admitted for treatment at the hospital, raising questions about the possible loss of their parents. Several were taken to pediatric trauma wards, indicating serious injuries. Referring to the extent and severity of the damage, Mayor Walter Maddox stated that "we have neighborhoods that have been basically removed from the map." The same tornado later went on to cause major damage in the Birmingham area. In all, the cost of damage from the tornado amounted to $2.45 billion, making it, at the time, the costliest tornado in U.S. history, though it would be surpassed less than a month later by the devastating Joplin, Missouri tornado of May 22.

The tornado was part of the 2011 Super Outbreak that affected large parts of the eastern United States and was the largest tornado outbreak ever recorded. In total, 324 people were killed by tornadoes during the outbreak, including 238 in Alabama alone. The tornadoes and other severe weather combined for over $10 billion in damage throughout the affected states, with more than 20% of the damage cost resulting from the tornado that struck Tuscaloosa.

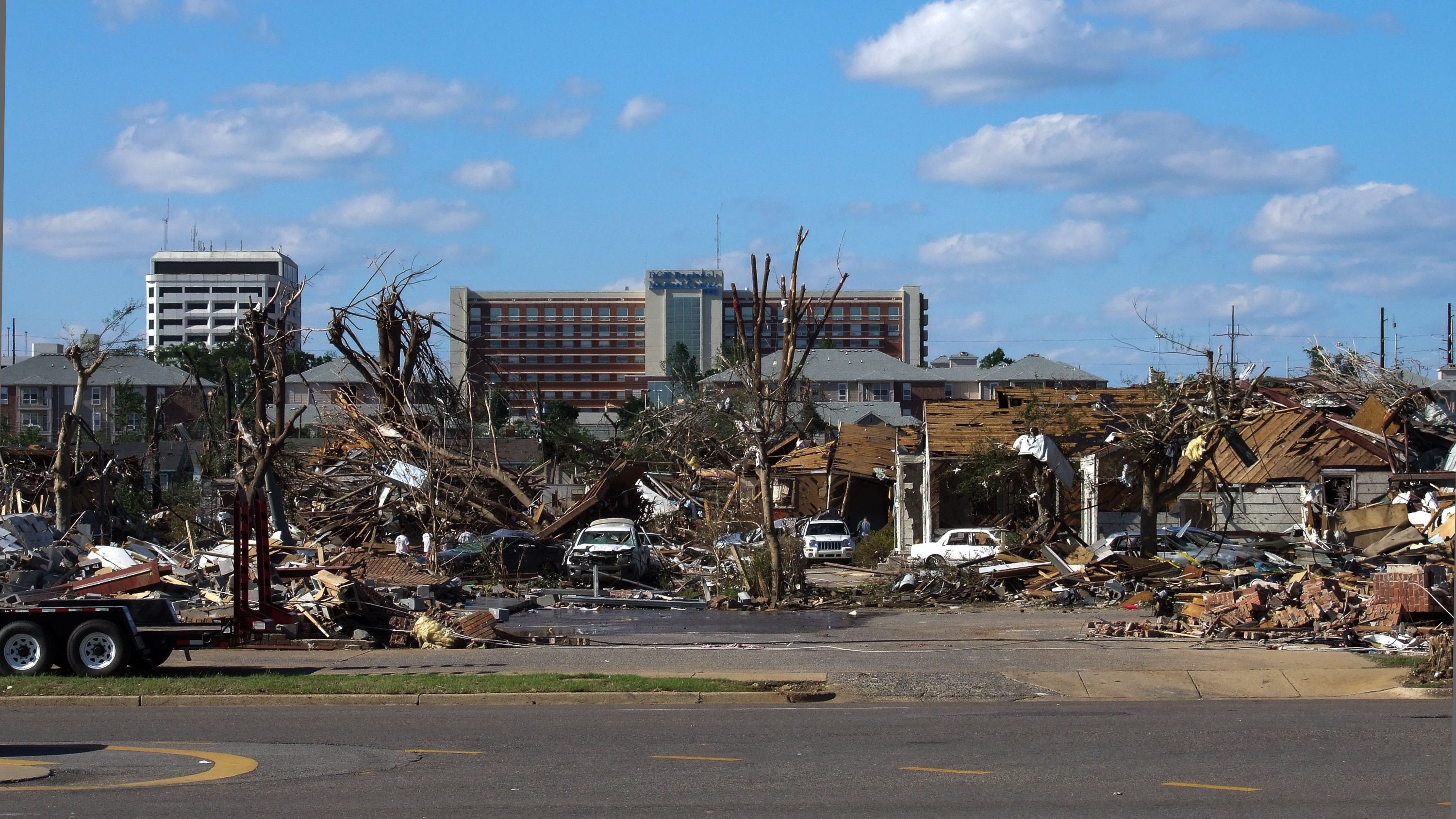
Immediate aftermath of the April 27, 2011, tornado. Druid City Hospital is in the background.

In the immediate aftermath of the tornado, thousands of rescue workers dug through the wreckage looking for survivors and recovering bodies. More than 450 persons were originally listed as missing in the post-disaster chaos, leading to fears that the death toll could climb rapidly and skepticism about the relatively low fatality figures in relation to the high number of casualties. Rumors abounded that refrigerated trucks were being brought to store unidentified remains, and that countless bodies were beneath area waters. But the fatality figure did not increase (and was later reduced). Most persons listed as missing were later found to have survived. During this period, The Tuscaloosa News posted an on-line people finder to aid people to find each other, as well as determine who was still missing.

Two days after the storm, U.S. President Barack Obama and Alabama Governor Robert Bentley and their spouses, Michelle Obama and Diane Bentley, respectively, accompanied Maddox on a tour of the damage and the recovery efforts, along with FEMA Administrator Craig Fugate and several Congressional dignitaries. Remarking about the scale and severity of the damage, Obama said, "I've never seen devastation like this, it's heartbreaking", after touring the damaged areas. Obama pledged the full resources of the federal government toward aiding the recovery efforts. Bentley—himself a Tuscaloosa native—pledged additional national guard troops.

Maddox announced that he was requesting 500 additional National Guard troops and calling for more volunteer aid workers and cadaver teams for the recovery of bodies, in order to prevent the spread of disease.

The New York Yankees organization contributed $500,000 to the American Red Cross and Salvation Army to aid in recovery efforts, and the Atlanta Braves organization donated $100,000. Actor Charlie Sheen visited the city to pay his respects on May 2 and donated supplies for relief efforts, along with several other actors, musicians and athletes.

Due to the disaster, on August 6, 2011, the University of Alabama held a delayed graduation ceremony for the class of 2011. It awarded posthumous degrees to six students who died in the tornado. The cable channel ESPN filmed a tribute in memory of the devastation.

=== Bicentennial ===
The city of Tuscaloosa celebrated its 200th birthday on December 13, 2019, with city officials holding various dedications and commemorative events throughout the city, including the displaying of a "bicentennial quilt" and a fireworks display following the 44th Annual West Alabama Christmas Parade, which was dedicated to the city's birthday. The University of Alabama gave two sculptures to the city, one of a 30-foot-tall (9.1 m), 9,500-pound (4,300 kg) statue of the Roman goddess Minerva—designed by local artist Caleb O'Connor—at Manderson Landing park along the Black Warrior River, and a sculpture known as The Walkway. According to the Tuscaloosa200.com website, the Walkway is a "replica of the route of the Black Warrior River from Demopolis to Tuscaloosa, it traces milestones in our city's existence and survival, but its twists and turns, ebbs and flows have mirrored our city's past." It was created by sculptor and architect Craig R. Wedderspoon.

A hermetically sealed time capsule was buried under a large boulder near the boat house near Manderson Landing; the time capsule is intended to capture "What was life like in Tuscaloosa during the year 2019?" and is set to be opened on December 13, 2069, the city's 250th birthday.

== Geography ==
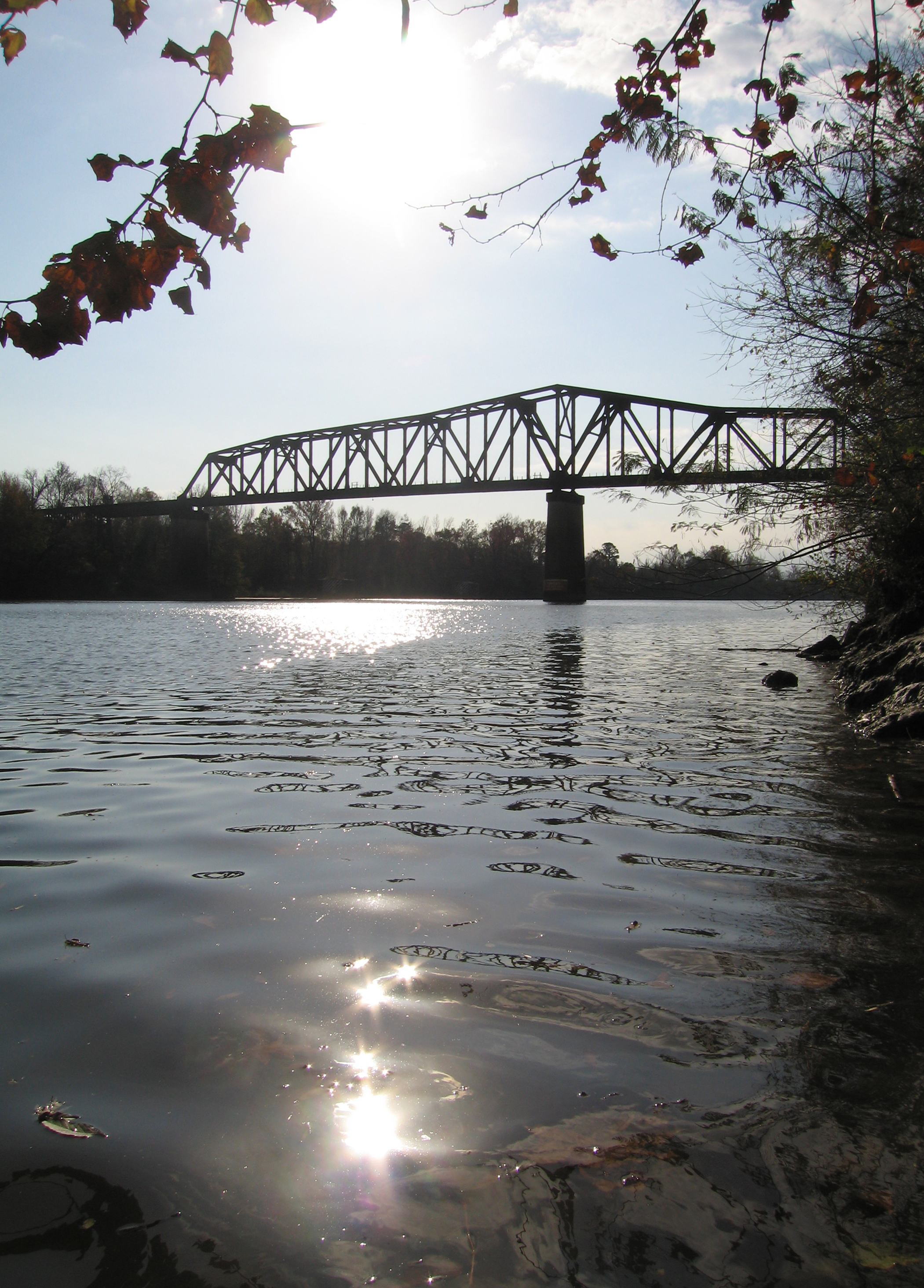
Black Warrior River in Tuscaloosa; M&O Railroad trestle in the background

According to the United States Census Bureau, the city has a total area of 72.22 square miles (187.0 km^{2}), of which 62.15 square miles (161.0 km^{2}) is land and 10.07 square miles (26.1 km^{2}), is water as of 2023. Most water within the city limits is in Lake Tuscaloosa, which is entirely in the city limits, and the Black Warrior River.

This city is located at 33°12′35″N 87°34′09″W (33.2098407, -87.5691735), approximately 60 miles (97 km) southwest of Birmingham. It lies on the fall line of the Black Warrior River, approximately 193 miles (311 km) upriver from the river's confluence with the Tombigbee River at Demopolis. Because of its location on the boundary between the Appalachian Highland and the Gulf Coastal Plain, the geography of the area around Tuscaloosa is diverse, varying from heavily forested hills to the northeast to a low-lying, marshy plain to the southwest.

=== Cityscape ===
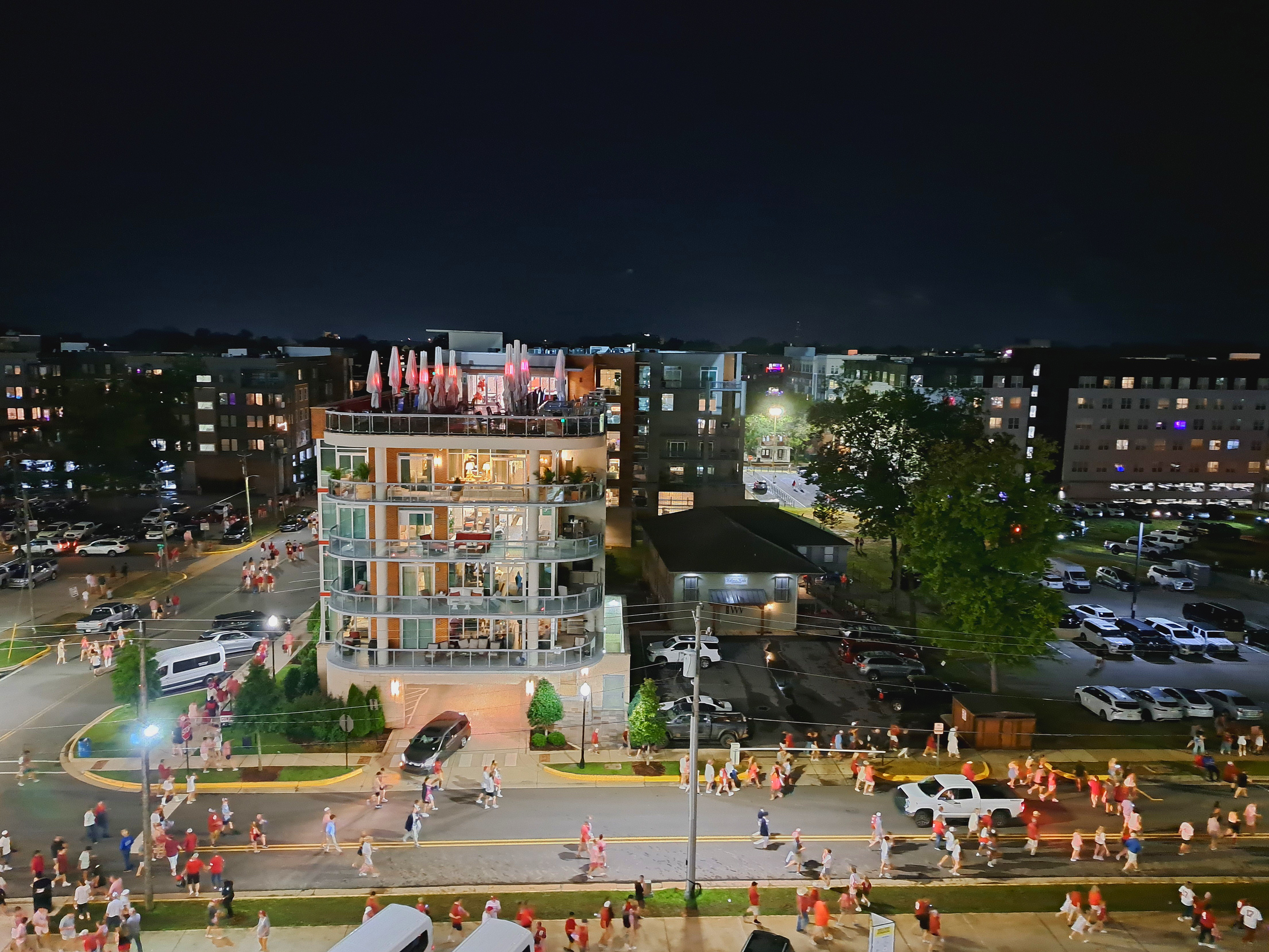
A view of Tuscaloosa at night.

Major areas of Tuscaloosa city proper include:

- Alberta
- Central/Midtown Tuscaloosa
- Downtown Tuscaloosa
- East Tuscaloosa
- Hillcrest
- North River
- University of Alabama main campus
- West Tuscaloosa

=== Climate ===
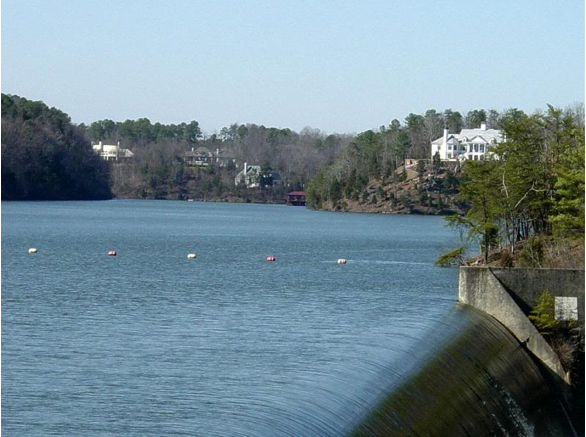
Spillway at Lake Tuscaloosa

Typical of the Deep South, Tuscaloosa experiences a humid subtropical climate (Köppen: Cfa). The Gulf of Mexico heavily influences the climate by supplying the region with warm, moist air. During the fall, winter, and spring seasons, the interaction of this warm, moist air with cooler, drier air from the North along fronts creates precipitation. These fronts usually move from west to east as they track along the jet stream. Notable exceptions occur during hurricane season, where storms may move from due south to due north or even from east to west during land-falling hurricanes. The interaction between low- and high-pressure air masses is most pronounced during the severe weather seasons in the spring and fall. During the summer, the jet stream flows well to the north of the southeastern U.S., and most precipitation is consequently convectional, i.e., caused by the warm surface heating the air above.

Severe thunderstorms can bring damaging winds, large hail, and occasionally tornadoes. An F4 tornado struck Tuscaloosa County in December 2000, killing eleven people. Tuscaloosa was struck by an F2 tornado in January 1997, which resulted in the death of one person. In April 2011, two tornadoes in a span of twelve days hit the city, the first being an EF3 on April 15, and the second and more devastating being an EF4 on April 27, when more than 50 deaths resulted. The city suffered considerable infrastructure damage.

Winter lasts from mid-December to late February; the daily average temperature in January is 44.7 °F (7.1 °C). On average, the low temperature falls to the freezing mark or below on 46 days a year, and to or below 20 °F (−7 °C) on 4.4 days. While rain is abundant (January and February are on average the wettest months), measurable snowfall is rare, with most years receiving none and the average seasonal snowfall amounting to 0.7 inches (1.8 cm). Spring usually lasts from late-February to mid-May, becoming drier as the season progresses. Summers last from mid-May to mid-September, and the July daily average temperature is 81.7 °F (27.6 °C). There are 71–72 days of 90 °F (32 °C)+ highs annually and 3.5 days of 100 °F (38 °C)+ highs. The latter part of summer tends to be drier. Autumn, which spans from mid-September to early December, tends to be similar to spring in terms of temperature and precipitation. Due to its relative distance from the Gulf moderation, the annual temperature range averages 84 °F (47 °C) between a summer high of 100 °F (38 °C) and a winter low of 16 °F (−9 °C). The 1991–2020 normals had the warmest summer night averaging 77 °F (25 °C) and the coldest winter day at 35 °F (2 °C). Ice days are very infrequent, but tend to occur a few times per decade.

The highest recorded temperature at the Tuscaloosa Regional Airport was 107 °F (42 °C) on July 29, 1952, and August 10, 2007, and the lowest recorded temperature was −1 °F (−18 °C) on January 21, 1985.

Climate data for Tuscaloosa, Alabama (Tuscaloosa Regional Airport), 1991–2020 normals, extremes 1948–present
Month	Jan	Feb	Mar	Apr	May	Jun	Jul	Aug	Sep	Oct	Nov	Dec	Year
Record high °F (°C)	82 (28)	86 (30)	88 (31)	94 (34)	98 (37)	105 (41)	107 (42)	107 (42)	104 (40)	101 (38)	89 (32)	82 (28)	107 (42)
Mean maximum °F (°C)	74 (23)	78 (26)	84 (29)	87 (31)	93 (34)	97 (36)	99 (37)	99 (37)	96 (36)	90 (32)	81 (27)	75 (24)	100 (38)
Mean daily maximum °F (°C)	55.7 (13.2)	60.2 (15.7)	68.3 (20.2)	75.5 (24.2)	83.0 (28.3)	89.2 (31.8)	91.6 (33.1)	91.2 (32.9)	87.0 (30.6)	76.9 (24.9)	65.6 (18.7)	57.9 (14.4)	75.2 (24.0)
Daily mean °F (°C)	45.7 (7.6)	49.6 (9.8)	56.9 (13.8)	63.8 (17.7)	72.2 (22.3)	79.1 (26.2)	81.9 (27.7)	81.5 (27.5)	76.3 (24.6)	65.2 (18.4)	54.2 (12.3)	48.0 (8.9)	64.5 (18.1)
Mean daily minimum °F (°C)	35.7 (2.1)	38.9 (3.8)	45.5 (7.5)	52.0 (11.1)	61.3 (16.3)	69.0 (20.6)	72.3 (22.4)	71.7 (22.1)	65.6 (18.7)	53.4 (11.9)	42.8 (6.0)	38.2 (3.4)	53.9 (12.2)
Mean minimum °F (°C)	18 (−8)	23 (−5)	28 (−2)	37 (3)	47 (8)	60 (16)	66 (19)	65 (18)	54 (12)	38 (3)	28 (−2)	23 (−5)	16 (−9)
Record low °F (°C)	−1 (−18)	5 (−15)	12 (−11)	29 (−2)	36 (2)	45 (7)	54 (12)	53 (12)	37 (3)	23 (−5)	10 (−12)	2 (−17)	−1 (−18)
Average precipitation inches (mm)	4.97 (126)	5.37 (136)	4.82 (122)	5.00 (127)	3.64 (92)	4.67 (119)	4.17 (106)	4.36 (111)	3.40 (86)	3.54 (90)	4.52 (115)	5.06 (129)	53.52 (1,359)
Average precipitation days (≥ 0.01 in)	10.3	10.8	10.8	8.9	9.4	9.9	11.1	10.7	7.6	8.7	8.8	10.7	117.7
Source: NOAA

== Demographics ==
Historical population
Census	Pop.	Note	%±
1840	1,949		—
1850	3,500		79.6%
1860	3,989		14.0%
1870	1,689		−57.7%
1880	2,418		43.2%
1890	4,215		74.3%
1900	5,094		20.9%
1910	8,407		65.0%
1920	11,996		42.7%
1930	20,659		72.2%
1940	27,493		33.1%
1950	46,396		68.8%
1960	63,370		36.6%
1970	65,773		3.8%
1980	75,211		14.3%
1990	77,759		3.4%
2000	77,906		0.2%
2010	90,468		16.1%
2020	99,600		10.1%
2022 (est.)	110,602	▲	11.0%
U.S. Decennial Census; 2020 Census

=== Racial and ethnic composition ===
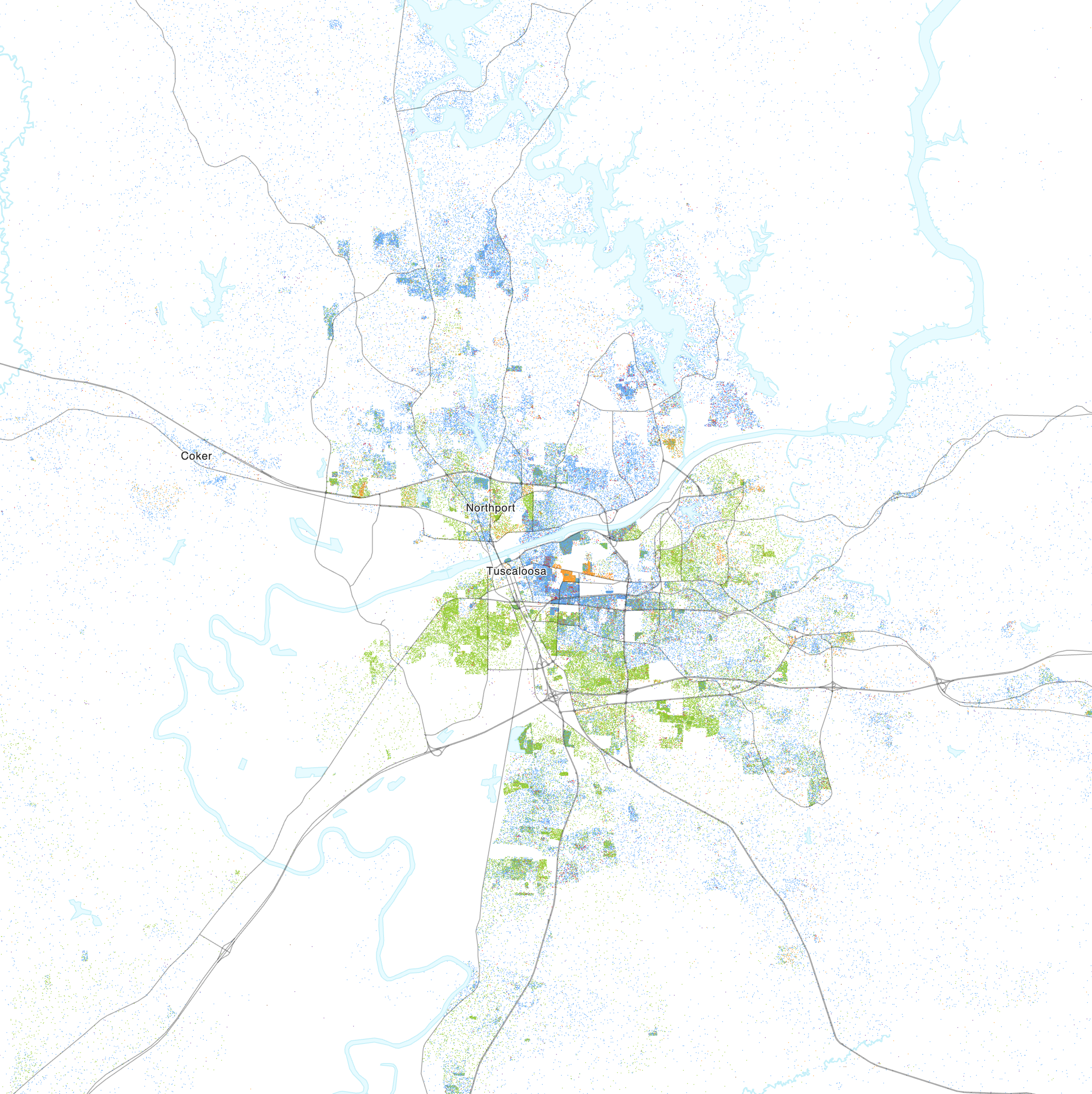
Map of racial distribution in Tuscaloosa, 2020 U.S. census. Each dot is one person: ⬤ White ⬤ Black ⬤ Asian ⬤ Hispanic ⬤ Multiracial ⬤ Native American/Other

Tuscaloosa, Alabama – Racial and ethnic composition Note: the US Census treats Hispanic/Latino as an ethnic category. This table excludes Latinos from the racial categories and assigns them to a separate category. Hispanics/Latinos may be of any race.
Race / Ethnicity (NH = Non-Hispanic)	Pop 2000	Pop 2010	Pop 2020	% 2000	% 2010	% 2020
White alone (NH)	41,667	47,574	47,663	53.48%	52.59%	47.85%
Black or African American alone (NH)	33,164	37,417	40,867	42.57%	41.36%	41.03%
Native American or Alaska Native alone (NH)	119	190	147	0.15%	0.21%	0.15%
Asian alone (NH)	1,159	1,659	2,352	1.49%	1.83%	2.36%
Pacific Islander alone (NH)	15	19	47	0.02%	0.02%	0.05%
Other race alone (NH)	60	74	454	0.08%	0.08%	0.46%
Mixed race or Multiracial (NH)	630	830	2,632	0.81%	0.92%	2.64%
Hispanic or Latino (any race)	1,092	2,705	5,438	1.40%	2.99%	5.46%
Total	77,906	90,468	99,600	100.00%	100.00%	100.00%

=== 2020 census ===
As of the 2020 census, Tuscaloosa had a population of 99,600 and 40,817 households, including 19,203 families. The median age was 27.1 years. 16.9% of residents were under the age of 18 and 12.1% of residents were 65 years of age or older. For every 100 females there were 89.4 males, and for every 100 females age 18 and over there were 87.1 males age 18 and over.

Of the 40,817 households, 22.3% had children under the age of 18 living in them. Of all households, 26.0% were married-couple households, 27.8% were households with a male householder and no spouse or partner present, and 40.8% were households with a female householder and no spouse or partner present. About 39.2% of all households were made up of individuals and 9.6% had someone living alone who was 65 years of age or older.

There were 47,465 housing units, of which 14.0% were vacant. The homeowner vacancy rate was 1.9% and the rental vacancy rate was 12.7%. The population density was 1,609.1 inhabitants per square mile (621.3/km^{2}).

98.2% of residents lived in urban areas, while 1.8% lived in rural areas.

Racial composition as of the 2020 census
Race	Number	Percentage
White	48,463	48.7%
Black or African American	41,046	41.2%
American Indian and Alaska Native	293	0.3%
Asian	2,362	2.4%
Native Hawaiian and Other Pacific Islander	52	0.1%
Some other race	2,090	2.1%
Two or more races	5,294	5.3%
Hispanic or Latino (of any race)	5,438	5.5%

In 2023, the City of Tuscaloosa secured an updated count for the 2020 Census, after proving an undercount of at least 1,100 University of Alabama students who were residing temporarily off-campus due to the COVID-19 pandemic. The U.S. Census Bureau accepted the review, bringing the official 2020 Tuscaloosa population count to over 100,000 residents.

=== 2010 census ===
As of the 2010 census, there were 90,468 people, 36,185 households, and 17,592 families residing in the city. The population density was 1,502.8 inhabitants per square mile (580.2/km^{2}). There were 40,842 housing units at an average density of 678.4 per square mile (261.9/km^{2}). The racial makeup of the city was 53.8% White, 41.5% Black or African American, 0.2% Native American, 1.8% Asian, 0.0% Pacific Islander, 1.5% from other races, and 1.1% from two or more races. 3.0% of the population were Hispanic or Latino of any race.

There were 36,185 households, out of which 20.5% had children under the age of 18 living with them, 28.5% were married couples living together, 16.2% had a female householder with no husband present, and 51.4% were non-families. 35.4% of all households were made up of individuals, and 7.8% had someone living alone who was 65 years of age or older. The average household size was 2.23 and the average family size was 2.95.

In the city, 17.4% of the population was under the age of 18, 31.9% was from 18 to 24, 22.0% from 25 to 44, 19.0% from 45 to 64, and 9.8% was 65 years of age or older. The median age was 25.4 years. For every 100 females, there were 92.7 males. For every 100 females age 18 and over, there were 94.6 males.

The median income for a household in the city was $31,874, and the median income for a family was $49,588. Males had a median income of $36,231 versus $30,552 for females. The per capita income for the city was $21,042. About 17.0% of families and 29.8% of the population were below the poverty line, including 32.5% of those under age 18 and 12.4% of those age 65 or over.

=== 2000 census ===
As of the 2000 census, there were 77,906 people, 31,381 households, and 16,945 families residing in the city. The population density was 1,385.2 inhabitants per square mile (534.8/km^{2}). There were 34,857 housing units at an average density of 619.8 per square mile (239.3/km^{2}). The racial makeup of the city was 54.09% White, 42.73% Black or African American, 0.16% Native American, 1.49% Asian, 0.02% Pacific Islander, 0.63% from other races, and 0.87% from two or more races. 1.40% of the population were Hispanic or Latino of any race.

There were 31,381 households, out of which 23.9% had children under the age of 18 living with them, 35.0% were married couples living together, 15.7% had a female householder with no husband present, and 46.0% were non-families. 35.2% of all households were made up of individuals, and 9.3% had someone living alone who was 65 years of age or older. The average household size was 2.22 and the average family size was 2.93.

In the city, 19.8% of the population was under the age of 18, 24.5% was from 18 to 24, 25.4% from 25 to 44, 18.5% from 45 to 64, and 11.8% was 65 years of age or older. The median age was 28 years. For every 100 females, there were 90.8 males. For every 100 females age 18 and over, there were 87.9 males.

The median income for a household in the city was $27,731, and the median income for a family was $41,753. Males had a median income of $31,614 versus $24,507 for females. The per capita income for the city was $19,129. About 14.2% of families and 23.6% of the population were below the poverty line, including 25.3% of those under age 18 and 13.4% of those age 65 or over.

=== Religion ===
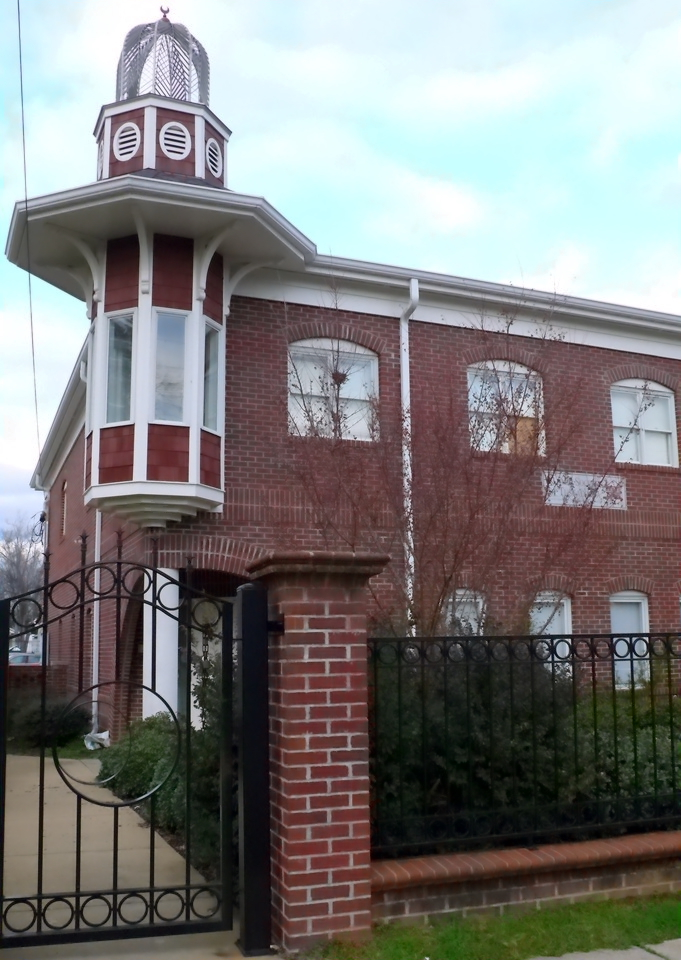
The Islamic Center of Tuscaloosa

The city of Tuscaloosa is home to many places of worship to which people from the surrounding area of West Alabama may come; the predominant denomination is Southern Baptist. Holy Spirit Roman Catholic Church is one of three Catholic churches. First Presbyterian Church is the place of worship for many American and German residents in Tuscaloosa. There are also Presbyterian Church in America congregations in the city. First Baptist Church, Calvary Baptist Church, Alberta Baptist Church, Emmanuel Baptist Church, and First African Baptist Church are five of the many Baptist churches in Tuscaloosa. Holy Cross Lutheran Church is a church reflecting on the Evangelical Lutheran community of Tuscaloosa. There is the Unitarian Universalist Congregation of Tuscaloosa. The University Church of Christ has both a campus ministry and a prison ministry. St. Gregory the Theologian Eastern Orthodox Church is the only Orthodox church in West Alabama. Its congregation is made up of Russians, Greeks, Romanians, Arabs, Eastern Europeans, and converts to Eastern Christianity. Some of the oldest churches in Tuscaloosa are St. John's Roman Catholic Church (founded c. 1845), Christ Episcopal Church (c. 1828), and First Baptist Church (c. 1818).

Tuscaloosa is also home to many non-Christians as well. A Jewish community worships at the Chabad of Tuscaloosa as well as at Temple Emanu-El and the Hillel B'nai B'rith Center, both located on the University of Alabama campus. The Hindu Mandir Temple and Cultural Center is also found in Tuscaloosa. Muslims constitute a small percentage of the population and worship at an Islamic center located near the university campus. There is also a Kingdom Hall of Jehovah's Witnesses.

== Economy ==
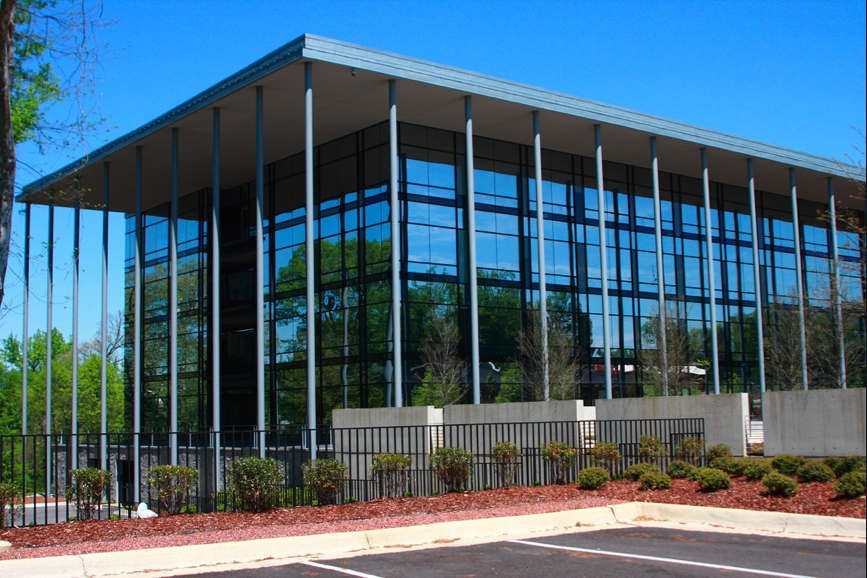
Bank of Tuscaloosa Plaza

Higher education continues to be the foundation of Tuscaloosa's economy; however, the metropolitan area consists of a blend of retail, automotive, manufacturing, healthcare, education and public sector employment.

The University of Alabama is the city's largest employer and generates over $2.5 billion in economic impact annually and supports industries related to retail, housing, dining and tourism activity in the area. Major national research centers are also hosted in the city, including the U.S. Geological Survey's Hydrologic Instrumentation Facility and the National Water Center, both located on the campus of The University of Alabama.

Mercedes-Benz U.S. International (MBUSI) serves as a major contributor to the industrial economy. More than 6,100 people are employed by MBUSI and over 11,000 additional jobs are aided through a system of regional suppliers. According to 2024 data, it manufactures an array of SUV models, including the GLS, GLE, EQS, EQE, and the Maybach EQS. Brose Tuscaloosa, ARD Logistics and ZF Chassis Systems are some of the component manufacturers located in the area to support MBUSI operations.

Other significant employers include JVC America, Nucor Steel, BFGoodrich Tire Manufacturing, Hunt Refining Company, GAF Materials Corporations, The Westervelt Company, which houses its headquarters in Tuscaloosa, and gChem, which houses its production facility in the city.

Retail trade is also a vital sector. The Shoppes at Legacy Park, University Mall, Midtown Village and other service businesses and restaurants are all centrally located in the city at 15th Street and McFarland Boulevard.

Targeted workforce development advancements are offered through agencies such as AIDT, West AlabamaWorks!, and partnerships with local postsecondary institutions.

== Arts and culture ==
=== Libraries and museums ===
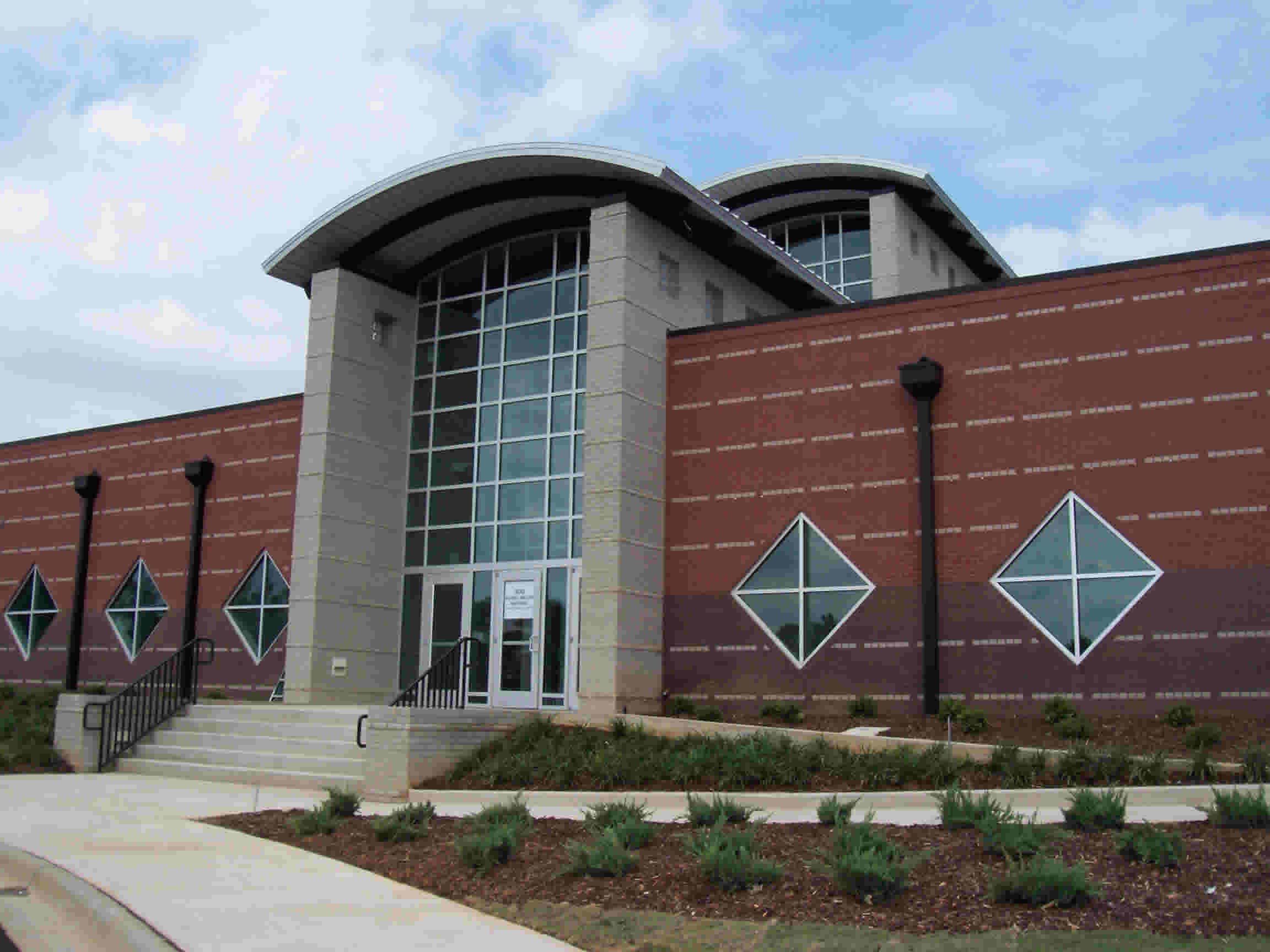
Tuscaloosa Public Library – Brown branch

The Tuscaloosa Public Library is a joint city-county agency with nearly 200,000 items and approximately 47,000 registered patrons (28% of the county's population). There are currently three branches: the Main branch, on Jack Warner Parkway; the Weaver-Bolden branch, in western Tuscaloosa; and the Brown branch in suburban Taylorville.

The University of Alabama, Stillman College and Shelton State Community College also have libraries open to the public for non-circulation use.

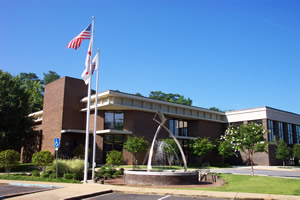
Tuscaloosa Public Library – Jack Warner Parkway branch

Museums in Tuscaloosa are located all over town, but are primarily concentrated in the downtown area or on the campus of UA. Museums that are downtown include CHOM: the Children's Hands-On Museum of Tuscaloosa and the Murphy African-American Museum. The Alabama Museum of Natural History and the Paul W. Bryant Museum are located on the UA campus. Additional museums and galleries are found across the river in Northport. The Jones Archaeological Museum is located 15 miles (24 km) south of Tuscaloosa at the Moundville Archaeological Park in Moundville.

=== Performing arts ===
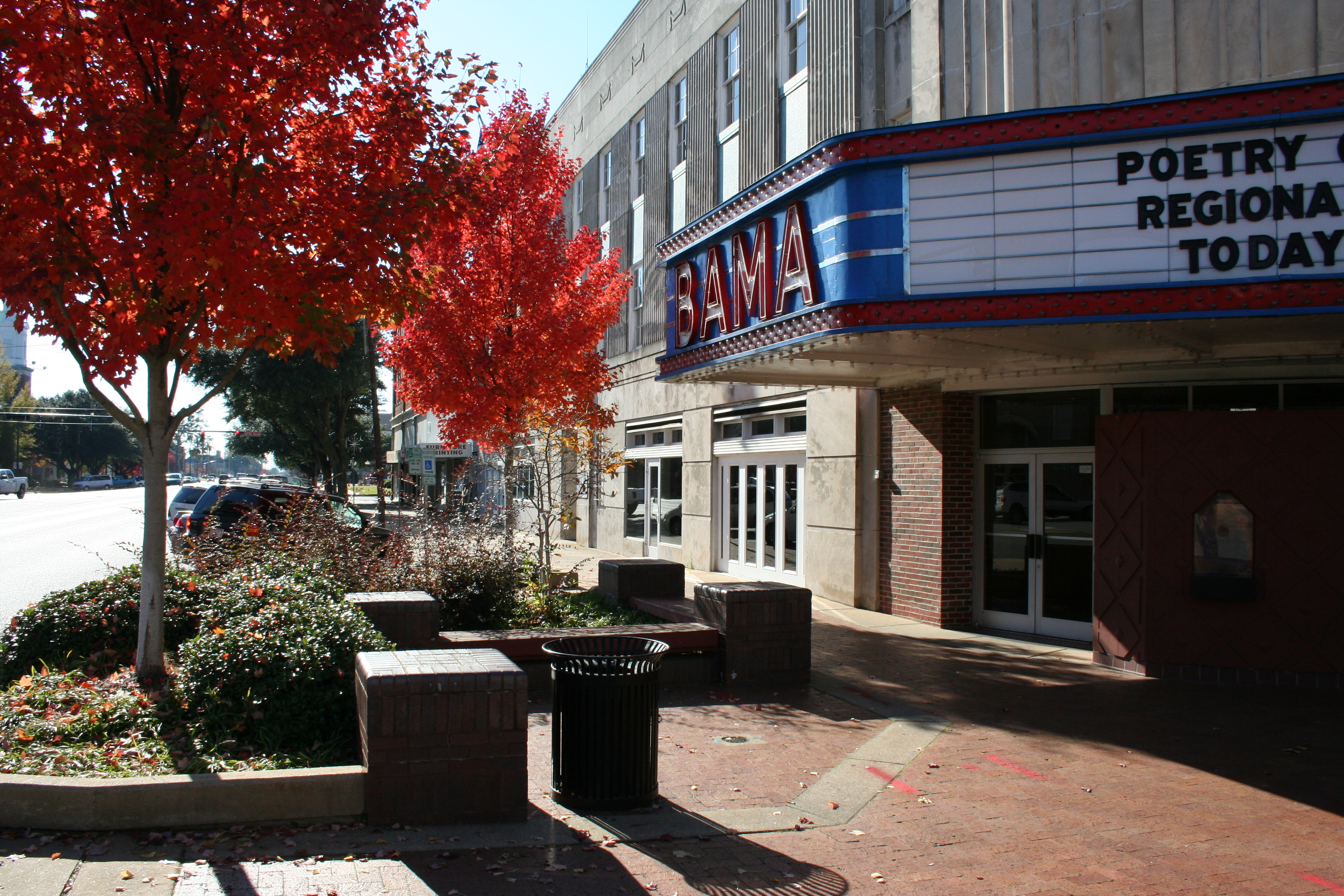
Bama Theatre

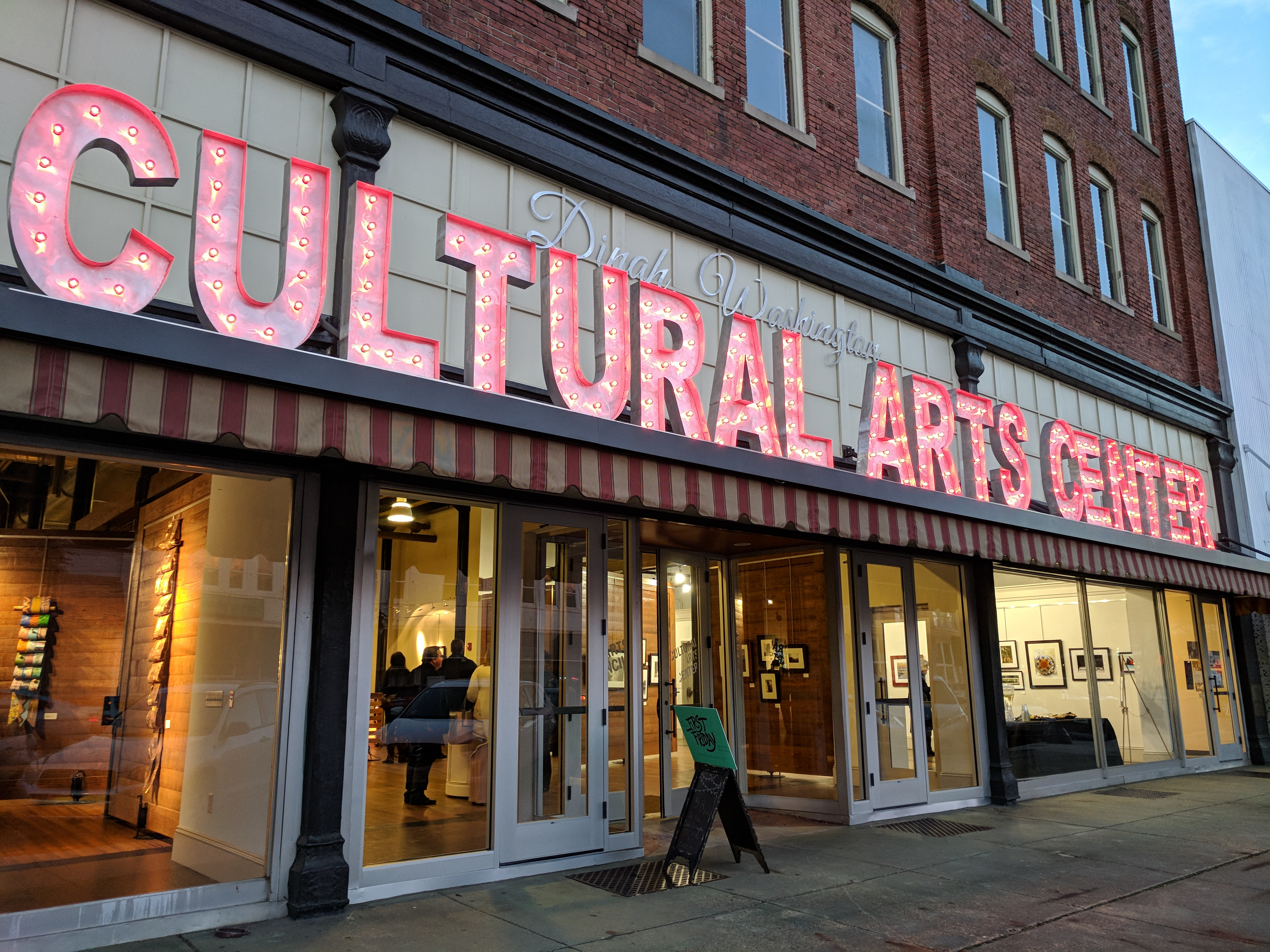
Dinah Washington Cultural Arts Center

Tuscaloosa is home to several performing arts organizations. Though some are affiliated with UA or Shelton State, several are independent organizations, including the Tuscaloosa Community Theater and Shakespeare troupe The Rude Mechanicals. These various organizations cooperate and coordinate their operations through the Arts and Humanities Council of Tuscaloosa County. The Arts Council also operates the Bama Theatre.

The Bama Theatre is a 1,094-seat proscenium theatre located in downtown Tuscaloosa and is operated by The Arts and Humanities Council. The Bama Theatre was built between 1937 and 1938 under the New Deal-era Public Works Administration as a movie palace. At the time of its construction in 1938, it was the only air-conditioned building in Tuscaloosa. The theatre was renovated as a performing arts center in 1976 and housed the Tuscaloosa Symphony Orchestra and Theatre Tuscaloosa troupe until those groups moved into their own facilities.

Today, the Bama Theatre is the residence of the Tuscaloosa Children's Theatre Company and the Tuscaloosa Community Dancers. Additionally, it hosts the Arts Council's Bama Art House movie series. The Bama Theatre hosts a Jewish Film Festival in the spring, as well as several traveling film festivals. Additionally, the Bama Theatre has recently been serving as a concert venue, hosting recent performances by Joan Baez, Aimee Mann, the Drive-By Truckers, Umphrey's Mcgee, Ryan Adams, Chuck Leavell and many other performing artists.

The Frank Moody Music Building on the UA campus holds a 1,000-seat Concert Hall and a 140-seat Recital Hall. The Concert Hall features a three-story-tall, 5,000-pipe Holtkamp organ and frequently hosts concerts and other musical events. The Recital Hall features a Schlicker organ that was crafted in Buffalo, New York. The Tuscaloosa Symphony Orchestra, in its 35th year, is based at the Moody Music Building and is conducted by Adam Flatt.

Also on the UA campus, Rowand-Johnson Hall holds the Marian Gallaway Theatre, a 305-seat proscenium theater, the Allen Bales 170-seat thrust theatre, and the 600-seat Morgan Auditorium. These facilities primarily host university-sponsored performing arts shows, such as Dance Alabama and the university's theater productions.

The Sandra Hall-Ray Fine Arts Centre on the Shelton State campus holds the Bean-Brown Theatre, a 450-seat proscenium theater, and the 100-seat Alabama Power Foundation Recital Hall.

Tuscaloosa is also home to the Alabama Choir School.

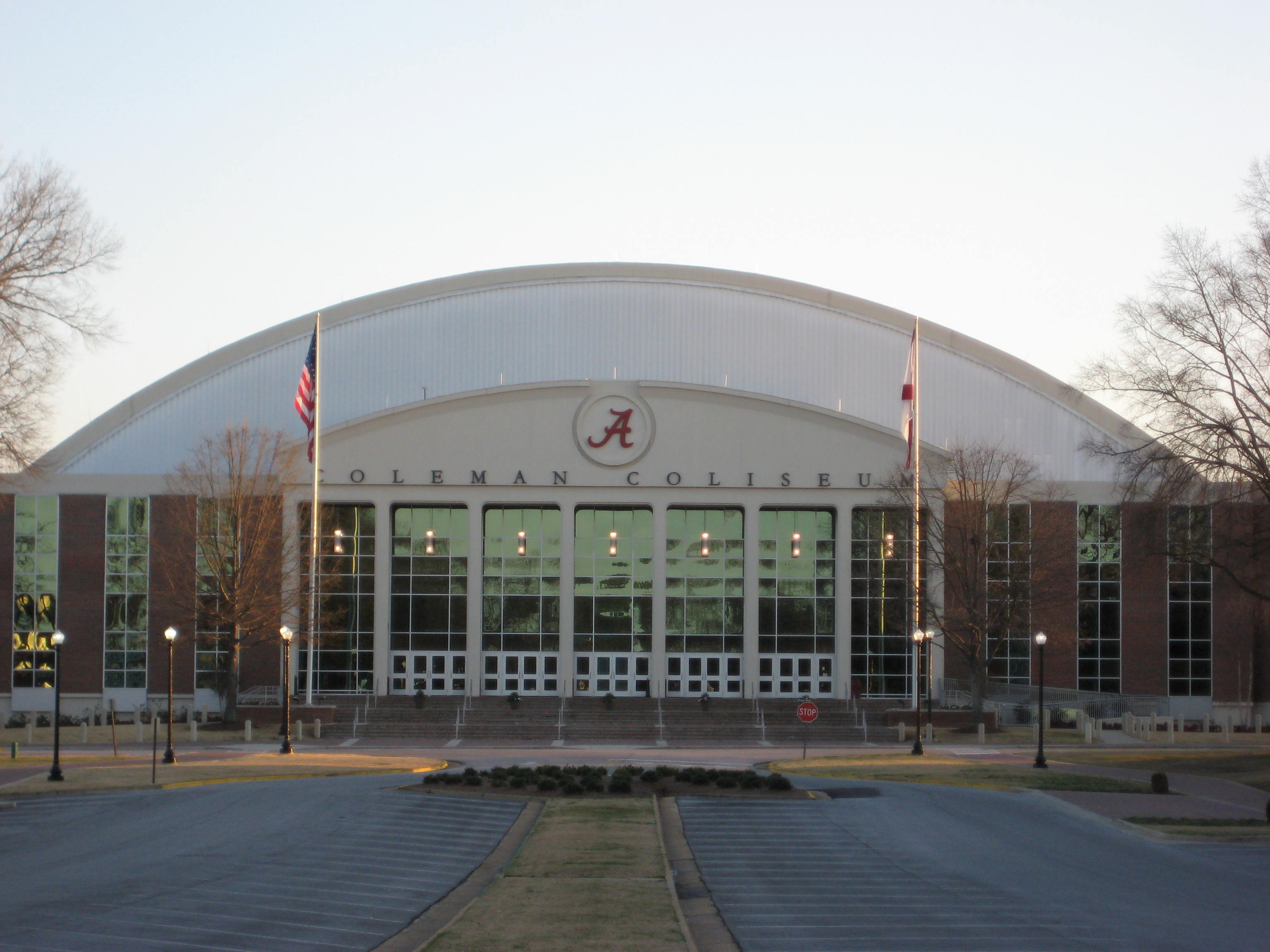
Coleman Coliseum

Coleman Coliseum is a 15,383-seat multipurpose arena that serves as the city of Tuscaloosa's municipal civic center. Because the City of Tuscaloosa does not have a civic center, the demand for events grew rapidly and the coliseum doubled its capacity in the 1970s. In the 1990s, marquee concerts and events that the arena had seen in the previous two decades grew scarce as the facility became more outdated and mostly devoted to Crimson Tide athletic events. In the hope that the university could pull more events at the facility, the coliseum underwent a significant renovation in 2005, costing over $24 million.

The coliseum has hosted a diversity of events including commencement exercises, a visit by President Ronald Reagan, alumni gatherings, student convocations, concerts, operas, ballets, appearances by political figures, WCW Saturday Night, etc. Travis Tritt filmed his "Bible Belt" country music video there. Some of the stars who have performed on its stages include The Rolling Stones, Elvis Presley, Elton John, the Grateful Dead, Tom Petty, Led Zeppelin, Ray Charles, Jimi Hendrix, Bob Dylan, Alan Jackson, Reba McEntire, Jay Leno, Hank Williams Jr., Daughtry, and B.o.B.

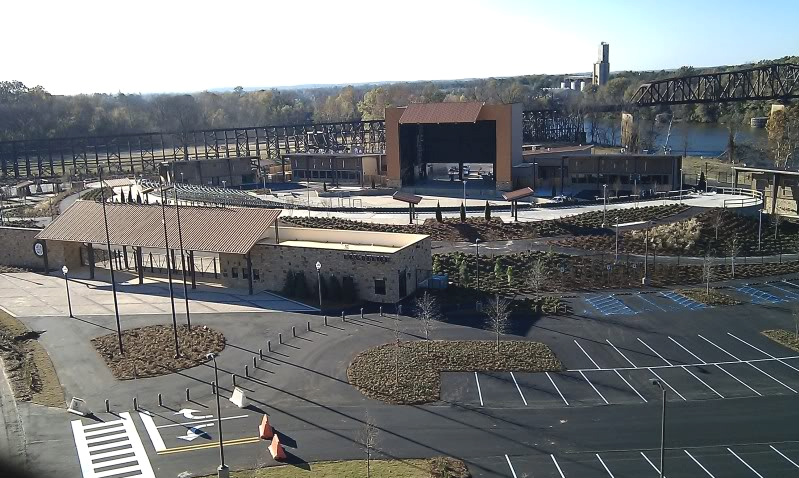
Tuscaloosa Amphitheater

In December 2010, construction on the Tuscaloosa Amphitheater officially wrapped up with the dedication ceremony taking place days after. The 7,470-capacity Tuscaloosa Amphitheater is blocks away from the downtown district and sits at the end of the Riverwalk on the banks of the Black Warrior River. Since its dedication ceremony in March 2011, a variety of performers have played there including John Legend, The Lumineers, Flo Rida, Nelly, TLC, ZZ Top, ODESZA, Mary J. Blige, Kenny Chesney, Widespread Panic, Steely Dan, Jeff Dunham, Jill Scott, and Fun. The amphitheater has held events such as the Blues and Brews Music Festival and a pro boxing match.

On November 7, 2023, during a Foreigner concert at the Tuscaloosa Amphitheater, the City of Tuscaloosa announced that the venue would be renamed the Mercedes-Benz Amphitheater in recognition of the company's long-standing sponsorship, support and impact on the region.

The Mercedes-Benz Amphitheater is home to the City of Tuscaloosa's annual Fourth of July Celebration on the River event. This free, family-friendly event features games and activities, a live performance by the Tuscaloosa Symphony Orchestra, and fireworks over the Black Warrior River.

=== Saban Center ===
In August 2025, the city held a groundbreaking ceremony for the Saban Center, a $120 million STEM and innovation hub. The center is a public-private partnership designed to link science, discovery, and exploration through a regional collaboration of the State of Alabama, Nick and Terry Saban, the University of Alabama, and others. The campus will serve as a nexus for interactive STEM education, workforce preparation and community engagement. It will also serve as the future home of the Tuscaloosa Children's Theatre and IGNITE, formerly Children's Hands-On Museum.

The Saban Center is named in honor of Nick and Terry Saban, whose philanthropic foundation played a vital part in its establishment. The project aims to serve as a national prototype for experiential learning, arts and innovation.

=== Festivals and events ===
Before each football game is a massive gathering at the UA Quad, where people gather starting on Friday for tailgating and the University of Alabama holds pep rallies on the Gorgas library steps. The Quad has hosted ESPN's College Gameday several times and also is a place to meet Alabama football legends on game day and perform the "Elephant Stomp" (a pre-game parade) to Bryant–Denny Stadium with the Alabama mascot "Big Al" and the Million Dollar Band.

Other annual city events worth noting are:

- Live at the Plaza – The City of Tuscaloosa's Live at the Plaza concert series is held annually on summer Friday nights at Government Plaza in downtown Tuscaloosa. This family-friendly event includes a wide variety of live, local music; a kids' zone; food trucks and vendors; and more.
- Sakura Festival – The Sakura Festival Celebration is an annual event, co-hosted by Tuscaloosa Sister Cities. It celebrates Japanese culture and symbolizes the beauty and significance of the cherry blossom season. Bringing together the local community and visitors to experience the sights, sounds, and flavors of Japan, the festival features traditional music and dance performances, tea ceremonies, calligraphy demonstrations, and an array of Japanese cuisine.
- Mayor's Cup – Annually, the City of Tuscaloosa and the mayor host the Mayor's Cup 5K for Pre-K. The event raises funds for the Tuscaloosa Pre-K Initiative, which aims to expand Pre-K access for Tuscaloosa children. It is open to all ages and participants are welcome to run or walk.
- Kentuck Festival of Arts – This annual event takes place during the third week in October near the banks of the Black Warrior River in Tuscaloosa. This nationally recognized event brings in visitors and artists from all over the United States. As several hundred talented artists bring their creations, several thousand visitors come to pay tribute to their skills. Those crowds come not only for the art, but also for the artistry of the days of old. Several artisans provide live demonstrations of blacksmithing, furniture making, quilting, and potting. There are music acts performing on stages and many varied foods available. In February 2024, Kentuck and the City of Tuscaloosa announced the relocation of the 2024 Kentuck Festival of the Arts to Snow Hinton Park in Tuscaloosa.
- Moundville Native American Festival – This annual festival takes place at the Moundville Archaeological Park. Native American performing artists, craftspeople, and musicians entertain and educate visitors about the rich culture and heritage that makes Southeastern Indians unique. Visitors can look forward to learning about the society and culture that existed there 800 years ago.
- Dickens Downtown – An annual Victorian holiday celebration known as Dickens Downtown takes place on the first Tuesday night in December in Downtown Northport. Dickens is a community supported gathering to celebrate the true spirit of Christmas involving Theatre Tuscaloosa performing scenes from A Christmas Carol, local choirs, the 5th Alabama Regimental Band, a real English Town Crier, father Christmas, and business and neighborhood open houses. As the area comes alive with characters and props straight from A Christmas Carol, local shops offer hot cocoa and cookies.
- Holidays on the Plaza – Holidays on the Plaza is the City of Tuscaloosa's seasonal ice skating rink. Alongside the rink, visitors can stroll through Tuscaloosa One Place's Tinsel Trail and participate in other holiday festivities.
- Druid City Arts Festival - Since 2010, the DCAF has been held at Government Plaza downtown in the first week of April every year. The annual open-air festival is free for anyone to attend and hosts vendors from around the state of Alabama and the country that display art, amateur and professional alike, that is available for purchase in tents scattered throughout the plaza. Attendees can travel from tent to tent admiring and buying available pieces, food, and other trinkets from vendors. There's a dedicated Kids Zone where sidewalk chalking takes place, and there's usually free musical performances held under the pavilion in the center of the plaza. The festival celebrated its 10th anniversary on April 5 and 6, 2019; it was also the festival's first two-day event, which is usually held for just one day a year.
- Tech or Treat – Similar to "trunk-or-treat," at Tech or Treat, families go from table to table collecting candy. At each table, children are introduced to science, technology, engineering, arts and math (STEAM) opportunities by interacting with City departments and community organizations. It is free and open to all ages.

=== Points of interest ===
Notable points of interest in the city of Tuscaloosa include:

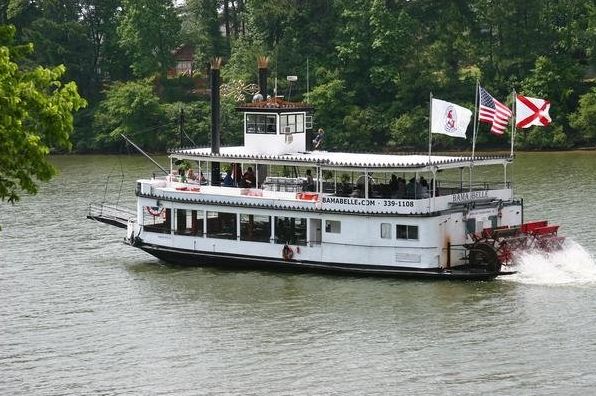
Bama Belle riverboat

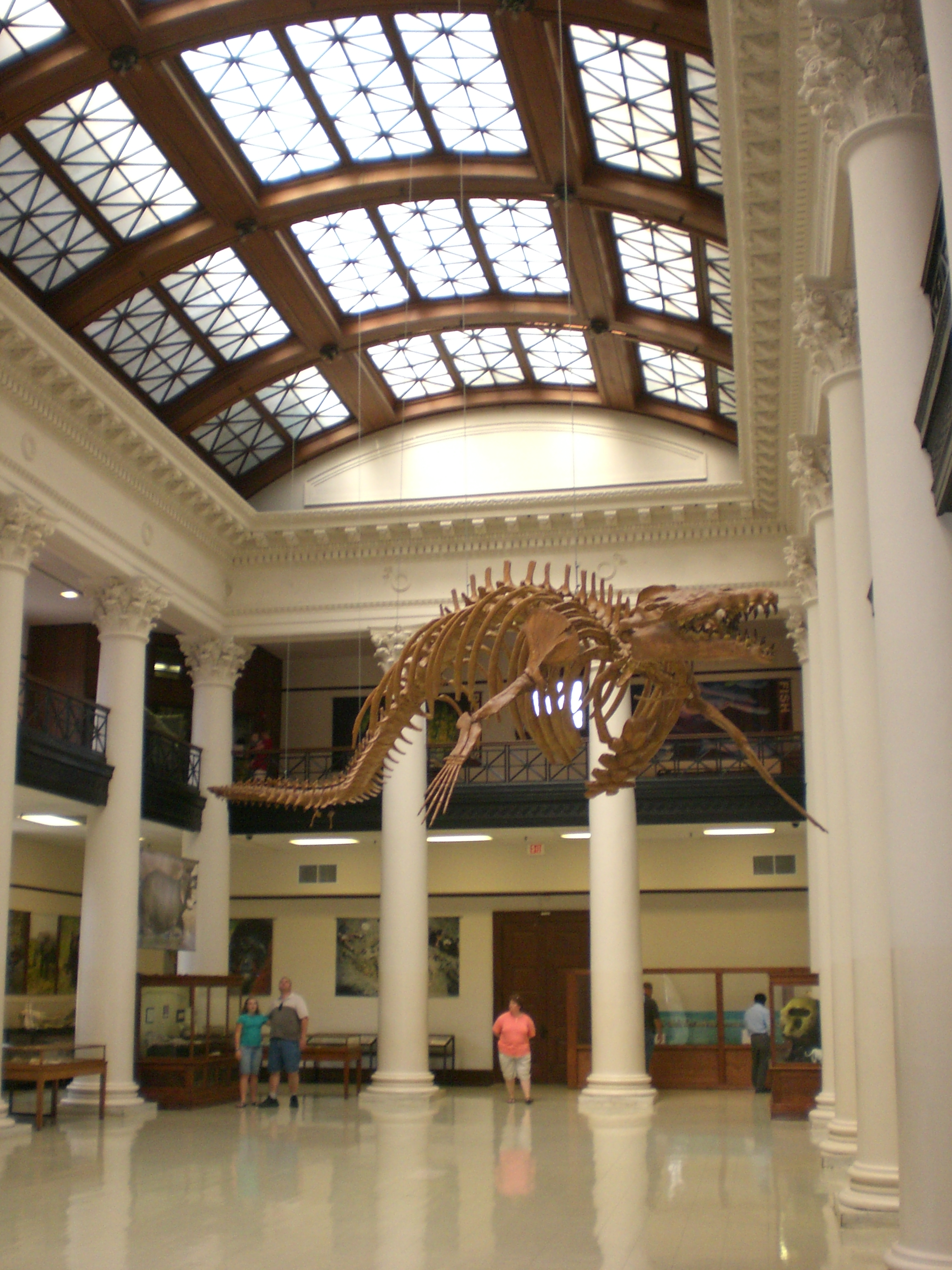
The Alabama Museum of Natural History

- Alabama Museum of Natural History
- Alabama Stage and Screen Hall of Fame
- Bama Theatre
- Battle-Friedman House
- Bryant–Denny Stadium
- Bryce Hospital
- Christ Episcopal Church
- Denny Chimes
- Downtown Tuscaloosa Historic District
- Dr. John R. Drish House
- Dreamland Bar-B-Que
- Gorgas House
- Hugh R. Thomas Bridge
- Jemison-Van de Graaff Mansion
- Moundville Archaeological Park
- Ol' Colony Golf Complex
- Paul Bryant Bridge
- Paul W. Bryant Museum
- Queen City Pool and Pool House
- Mercedes-Benz Amphitheater
- University of Alabama Arboretum
- Woolsey Finnell Bridge

== Sports ==
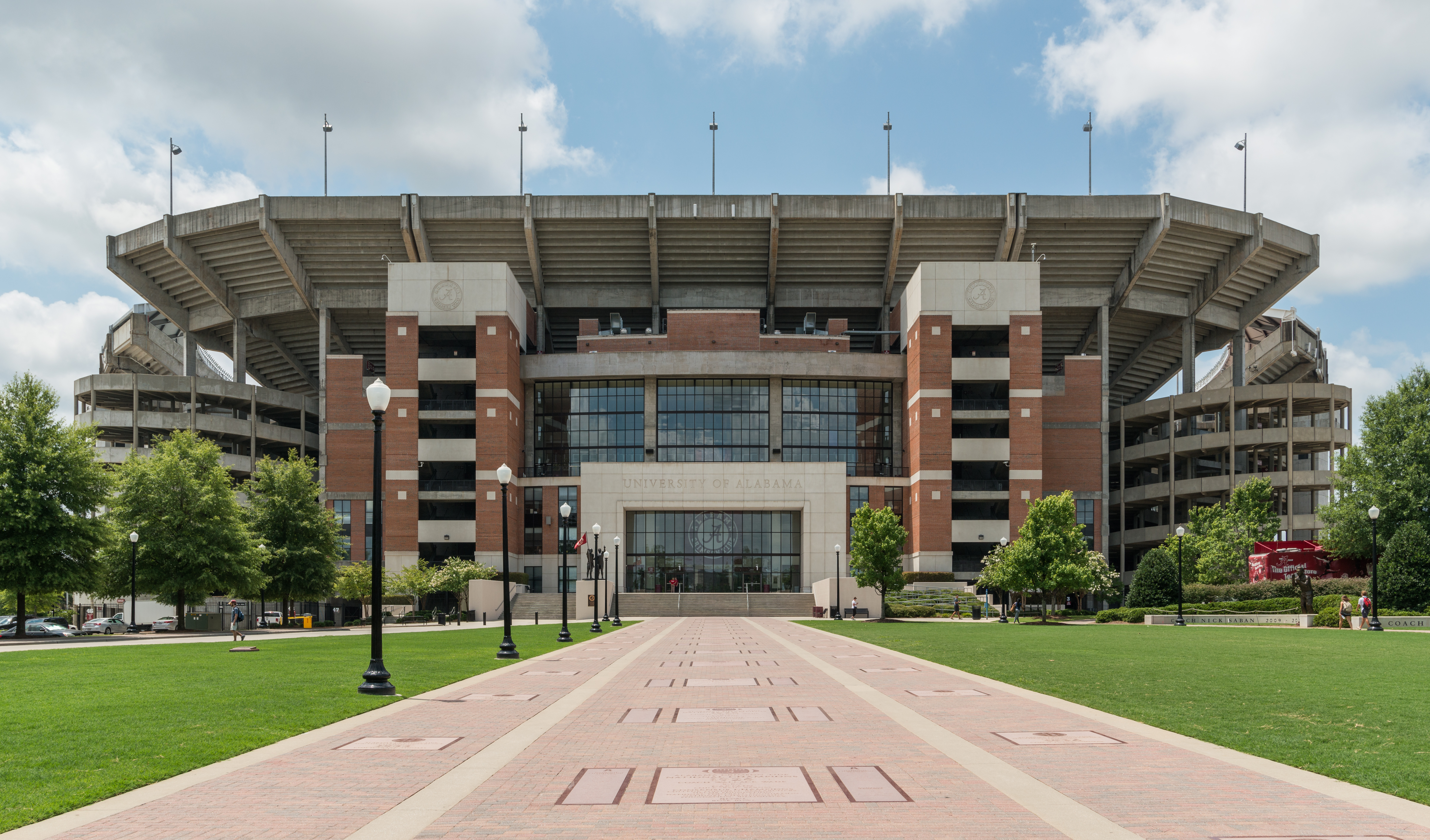
Bryant–Denny Stadium

Tuscaloosa is known for its collegiate athletics—particularly the University of Alabama Crimson Tide football team. The University of Alabama also currently fields championship-caliber teams in baseball, basketball, golf, women's gymnastics, and softball. These teams play in athletics facilities on the university campus, including Bryant–Denny Stadium (capacity: 102,000+), Coleman Coliseum (formerly Memorial Coliseum), Sewell-Thomas Stadium, Rhoads Stadium, Foster Auditorium and the Ol' Colony Golf Complex.

Stillman College fields teams in football, men's and women's basketball, baseball and softball, among other sports, although the school discontinued the football program after completing the 2015 season. In the past decade, Stillman has gone through a series of renovations, including a new football stadium, Stillman Stadium.

Previous professional teams calling Tuscaloosa home included the World Basketball Association's Druid City Dragons in 2006, and Tuscaloosa Warriors football team in 1963, with both folding after one season.

In 2008, Tuscaloosa hosted the USA Olympic Triathlon trials for the Beijing Games.

World renowned putter company T.P. Mills Co. was founded and is located in Tuscaloosa.

Tuscaloosa is also the birthplace and home of Deontay Wilder. He is a professional boxer that held the WBC Heavyweight Title from 2015 to 2020, making 10 successful title defenses. He is still active and boasts a record of 43 wins, 3 losses, and 1 draw, with 42 wins coming by way of KO.

== Parks and recreation ==
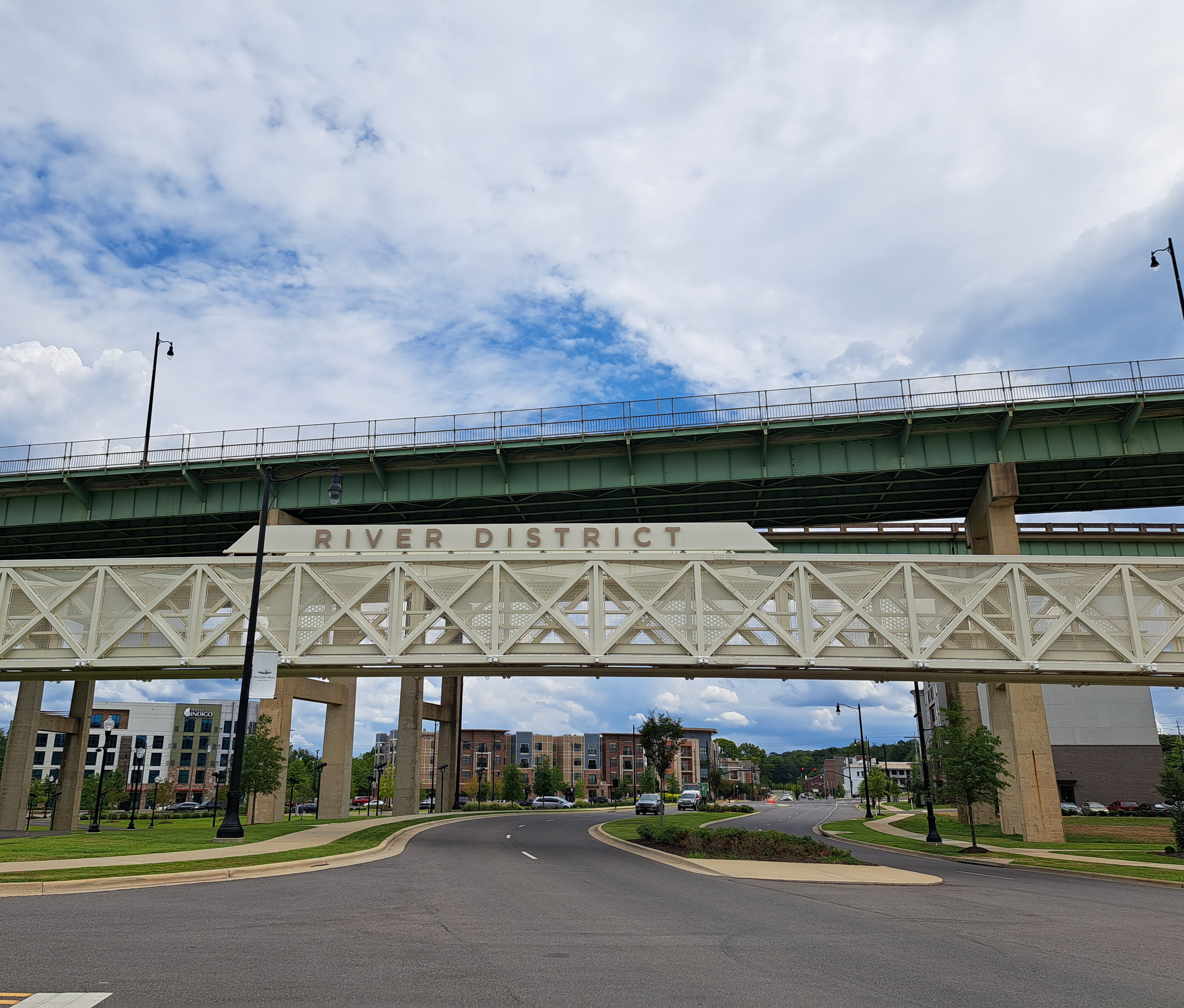
Entering the River District in downtown

Tuscaloosa County Parks and Recreation Authority, known by the acronym PARA, is a county agency that receives a large amount of its funding from the city, and operates several parks and activity centers within the city. PARA is known for its participation in work therapy programs with the local United States Department of Veterans Affairs. Additional public recreational sites are owned and maintained by the University of Alabama and federal agencies such as Corps of Engineers.

The University of Alabama Arboretum is located on 60 acres (243,000 m^{2}) of land at the intersection of Veterans Memorial Parkway and Pelham Loop Road, adjacent to the VA Hospital. The arboretum's primary emphasis is on Alabama's native flora and fauna. It includes 2.5 miles (4.0 km) of walking trails through native piney woods and oak-hickory climax forest, a wildflower garden containing more than 250 species, ornamental plants, an experimental garden, a bog garden, an open-air pavilion, and a children's garden. Two greenhouses contain collections of orchids, cacti, and tropical plants.

Capitol Park, Tuscaloosa at 6th Street and 28th Avenue is home to the ruins of the former state capitol building or State House from 1826 to 1845. It was later used by the Alabama Central Female College and burned down in 1923.

Other parks in Tuscaloosa include the Randall Family Park and Trailhead, Parker-Haun Park, the Western Riverwalk, Veterans Memorial Park, Tuscaloosa River Walk, the Park at Manderson Landing, J. Oviatt Bowers Park, Snow Hinton Park, Monnish Park, Annette N. Shelby Park, Kaulton Park, Palmore Park, and many others.

== Government ==
Tuscaloosa has a strong-mayor variant mayor-council form of government, led by a mayor and a seven-member city council. The mayor and council members are elected concurrently for four-year terms. The mayor is elected by the city at-large while council members are elected to single-member districts. Neither the mayor nor the members of the city council are term-limited. All elected offices are nonpartisan. Elections take place in years following presidential election years, with runoff elections taking place six weeks later if necessary. Terms begin immediately after election. The most recent municipal elections were held in 2021.

The mayor is the chief executive and administrative officer of the city. His main duty is to oversee the day-to-day operation of city departments pursuant to executing policy enacted by the city council or, in the absence of any council policy, his own discretion. His other duties include preparing an operating budget each year for approval by the city council and acting as ambassador of the city. The mayor also presides over city council meetings but votes only in case of ties. The current mayor of Tuscaloosa is Walter Maddox, who was elected to office in September 2005.

List of mayors of Tuscaloosa, Alabama
- William R. Bolling, 1828
- John Owen, 1828
- Wm. R. Smith, 1837
- Robt. S. Inge, 1837
- D. Henry Robinson, 1842
- Robert Blair, 1844–1848, 1859–1861, 1872
- James L. Childress, 1849
- Joseph C. Guild, 1850–1854
- David Woodruff, 1855
- L. S. Skinner, 1856–1858
- Robert Lacey, 1862
- Jesse E. Adams, 1863
- Obediah Berry, 1864–1865, 1873, 1877–1878
- Joseph C. Guild, 1866
- S. B. Smith, 1867
- John S. Garvin, 1867
- Josiah J. Pegues, 1868
- T. F. Samuel, 1869–1871
- John J. Harris, 1874–1876
- William C. Jemison, 1879–1890
- Henry B. Foster, 1891–1894
- William Jemison, 1895–1898
- ?
- John C. Pearson, circa 1931
- ?
- Luther Davis, circa 1937
- ?
- J. S. Robertson, circa 1952
- J. Hal McCall, 1953–1956
- George Van Tassel, 1956–1969
- C. Snow Hinton, Jr., 1969–1976
- Ernest W. "Rainy" Collins, 1976–1981
- Alvin P. DuPont, 1981–2005
- Walter Maddox, September 2005–present

The city council acts as the legislative body of the city. It is powered by state law to consider policy and enact law and to make appointments to city boards. The council also considers the budget proposed by the mayor for approval. The majority of work in the council is done by committee. These committees usually consist of three council members, one of whom will be chairman, and relevant non-voting city employees.

Tuscaloosa, as the largest county seat in western Alabama, serves a hub of state and federal government agencies. In addition to the customary offices associated with the county courthouse, namely two district court judges, six circuit court judges, the district attorney and the public defender, several Alabama state government agencies have regional offices in Tuscaloosa, such as the Alabama Department of Transportation and the Alabama State Troopers (the state police).

Tuscaloosa is in the federal jurisdiction of the United States District Court for the Northern District of Alabama. There is a courthouse in Tuscaloosa simply called the Federal Courthouse. Several federal agencies operate bureaus out of the courthouse.

Federally, Tuscaloosa is split between the 4th and 7th Congressional Districts, which are represented by Robert Aderholt (R) and Terri Sewell (D), respectively. In addition, Alabama's senior senator until 2023, Richard Shelby (R), is a resident of Tuscaloosa.

On the state level, the city is split among the 5th, 21st, and 24th Senate districts and 62nd, 63rd, and 70th House districts in the Alabama State Legislature.

In December 2009, construction on the new federal courthouse of Tuscaloosa began. The $67 million building was the centerpiece of a major downtown urban renewal project. According to information released by the General Services Administration, the building is 129,000 square feet (12,000 m^{2}) with parking. It houses the U.S. District Court, U.S. Bankruptcy Court and Social Security Administration office.

The Northern District of Alabama has only one facility suitable for holding a major criminal trial in Huntsville. However, Huntsville lacks the facilities for safely moving criminal suspects in and out of the building safely. Tuscaloosa's new federal courthouse will anchor the federal structure for the whole Northern District of Alabama.

Government buildings in Tuscaloosa
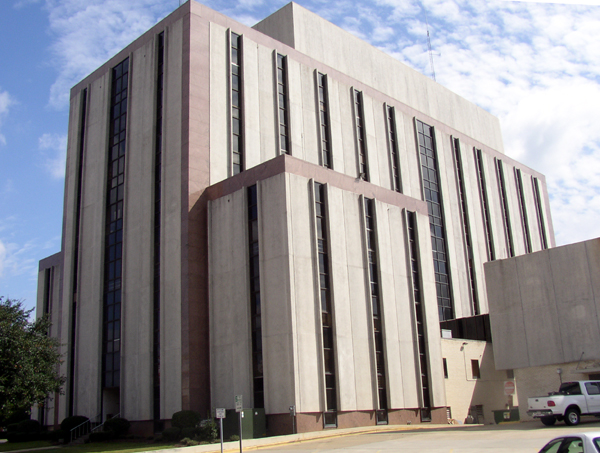
Tuscaloosa County courthouse

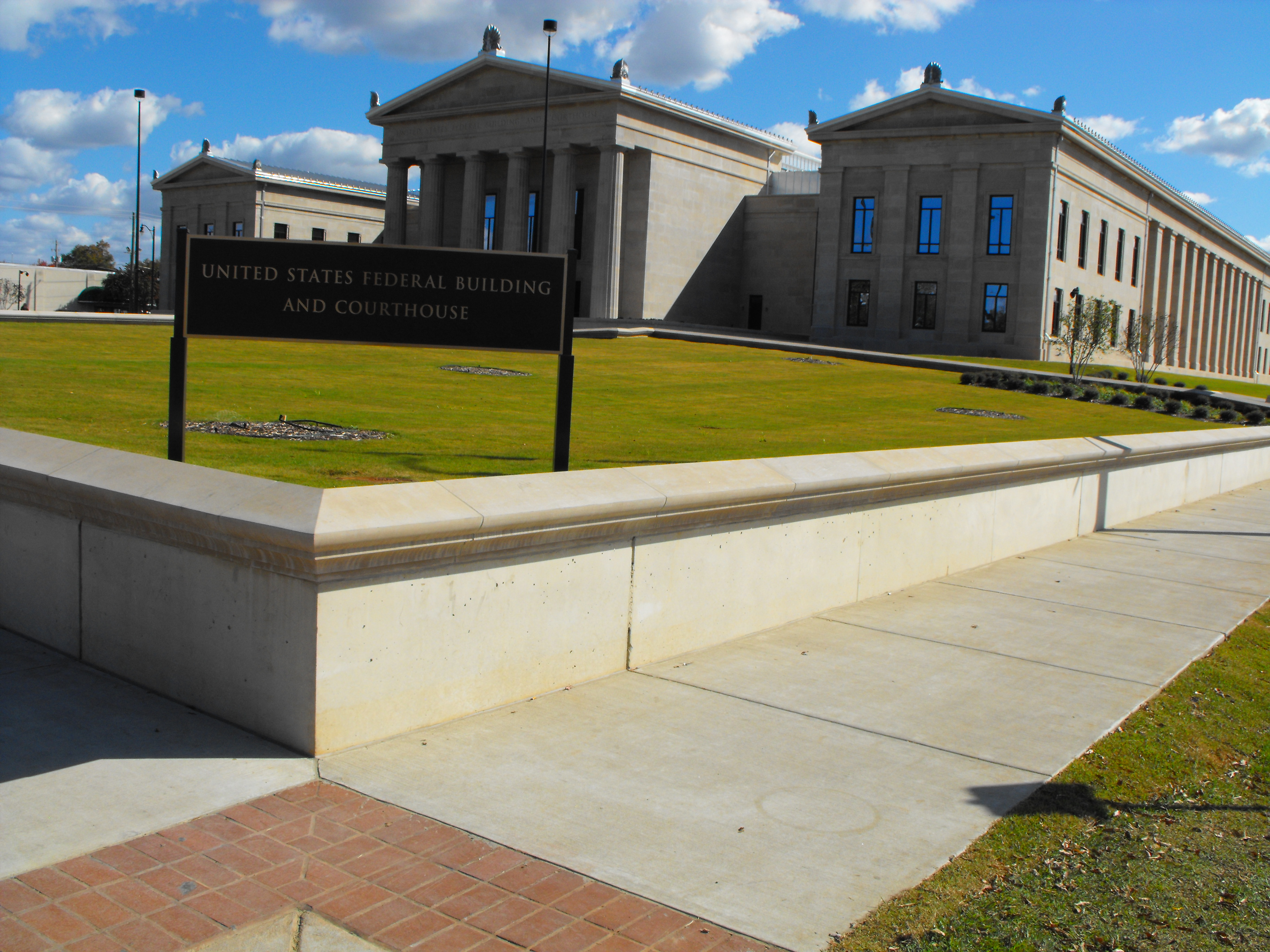
Tuscaloosa Federal Courthouse

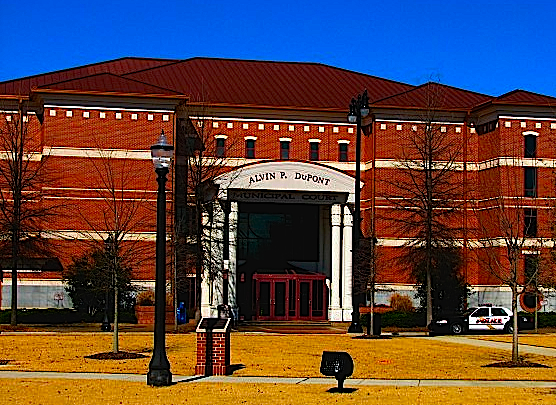
The Alvin P. DuPont Municipal Court building

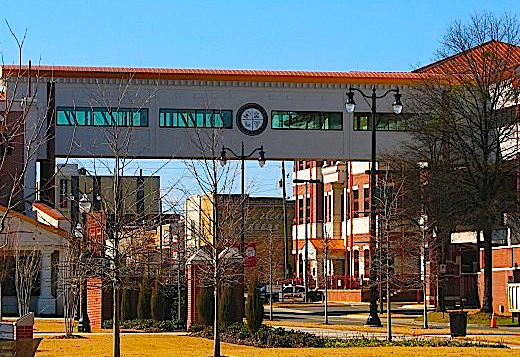
Tuscaloosa City Hall

== Education ==
=== Higher education ===
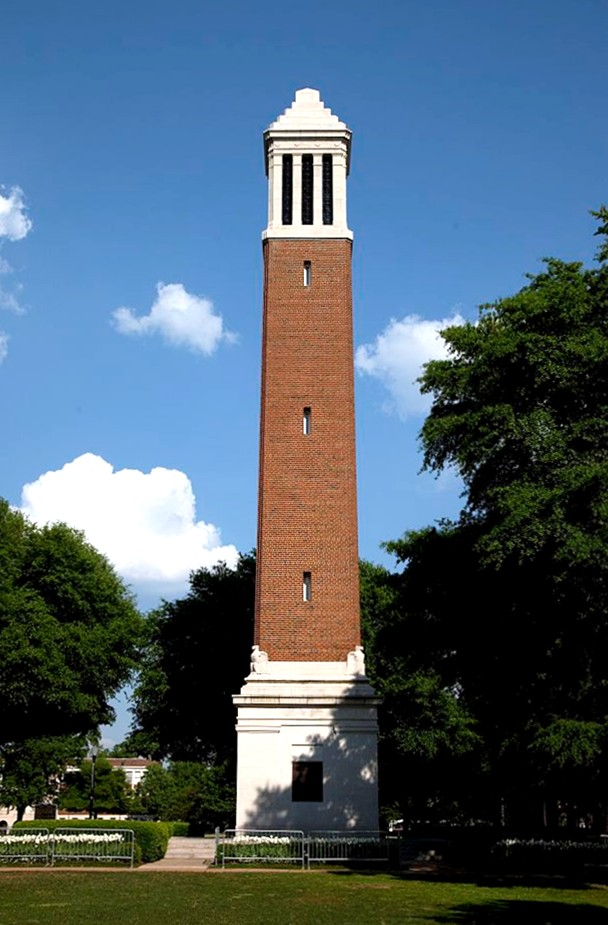
Denny Chimes on the University of Alabama quad

The University of Alabama is the largest university in the state of Alabama in terms of enrollment. Enrolling approximately 40,000 students on a 1,970-acre (8.0 km^{2}) campus, UA has been a part of Tuscaloosa's identity since it opened its doors in 1831. Stillman College, which opened in 1875, is a historically black liberal arts college enrolling approximately 1,200 students on a 105-acre (0.42 km^{2}) campus. Additionally, Shelton State Community College, one of the largest community colleges in Alabama, is located in the city. The school enrolls around 4,000 students from all backgrounds and income levels.

=== Primary and secondary education ===
The Tuscaloosa City Schools serves the city. It is overseen by the Tuscaloosa City Board of Education, which is composed of eight members elected by district and a chairman elected by a citywide vote. The Board appoints a Superintendent to manage the day-to-day operations of the system. Operating with a $100 million budget, the system enrolls approximately 10,300 students. The system consists of 24 schools: 13 elementary schools (12 zoned and 1 magnet), 6 middle schools (5 zoned and 1 magnet), 3 high schools (Paul W. Bryant High School, Central High School and Northridge High School), and 2 specialty schools (the Tuscaloosa Center for Technology, a vocational school, and Oak Hill School for special needs students). In 2002, the system spent $6,313 per pupil, the 19th highest amount of the 120 school systems in the state.

The Tuscaloosa County School System serves the county excluding the city. It is overseen by the Tuscaloosa County Board of Education, which is composed of seven elected members. The Board appoints a Superintendent to lead the school system. The system enrolls approximately 18,000 students which are served utilizing a budget of approximately $180 million. The school system consists of 34 schools—6 high schools, 8 middle schools and 19 elementary schools. It also provides services for special needs students at Sprayberry Education Center. In 2013 the school system hired its first minority superintendent of Hispanic/Latin origin who is also only the second female.

Tuscaloosa is also served by several private schools, both secular and religious, including Tuscaloosa Academy, American Christian Academy, Holy Spirit Catholic School, North River Christian Academy, the Capitol School, and Tuscaloosa Christian School (in neighboring Cottondale).

From 1923 to 2011, the state-run William D. Partlow Developmental Center served the intellectually disabled, offering these citizens a public education as well as seeing to their other needs.

=== Weekend education ===
Previously the Tuscaloosa Saturday School, a weekend Japanese educational program, provided Japanese language instruction for Japanese citizen children and other children in the area.

== Media ==
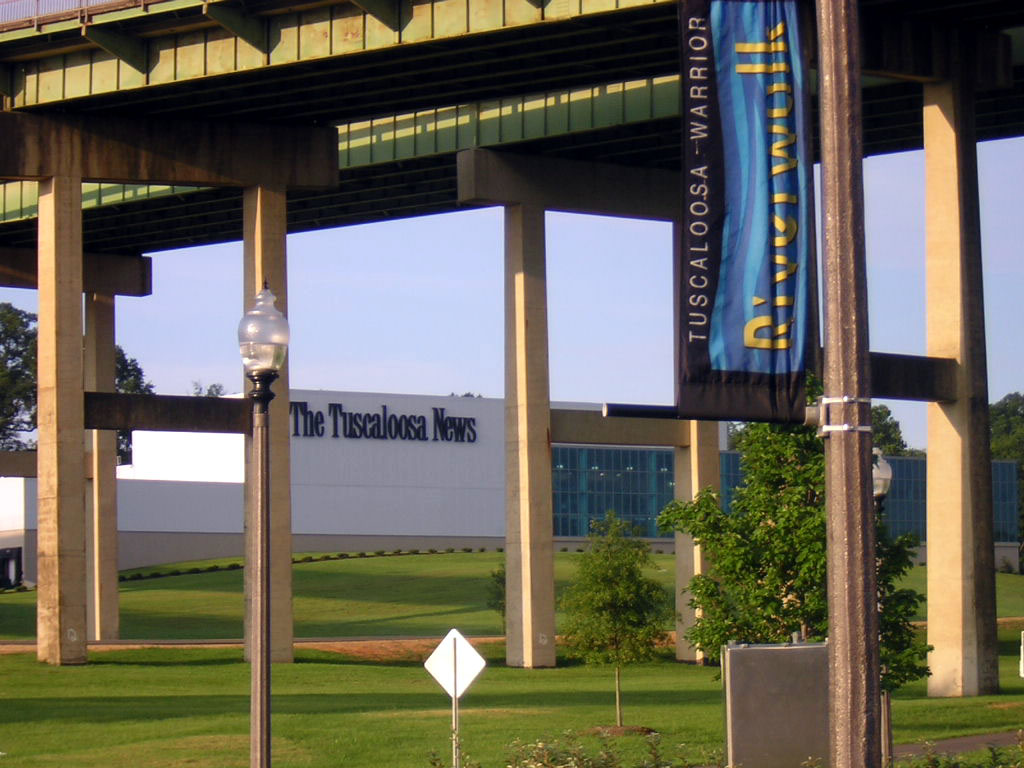
Former headquarters of the Tuscaloosa News as seen from the Riverwalk

The Tuscaloosa News is the major daily newspaper serving the city. The Tuscaloosa News also publishes several websites. The primary news website is tuscaloosanews.com. Tidesports.com focuses on University of Alabama sports. The Tuscaloosa News offices were located west of downtown on a bluff overlooking the Black Warrior River. In October 2023, Maddox announced that the former News office building were to be removed to make way for the Saban Center.

Each of the three colleges in the area are served by student-published periodicals, the largest being The Crimson White, the independent, student-run newspaper of the University of Alabama and one of several UA-affiliated student publications.

Kids Life Magazine is a free publication which focuses on family friendly events in the Tuscaloosa area.

Tuscaloosa is part of the Birmingham-Tuscaloosa-Anniston television market, which is the 40th largest in the nation. All major networks have a presence in the market: WBRC 6 (Fox), WVUA-CD 7 (Cozi TV), WBIQ 10 (PBS), WVTM 13 (NBC, with CBS on DT4), WTTO 21 (Independent), WSES 33 (Heroes & Icons), WIAT 42 (The CW) and WABM 68 (MyNetworkTV, with ABC [via WBMA-LD] on DT2). WVUA-CD is the only station that originates its broadcast in Tuscaloosa; it is owned by the University of Alabama, and its studios are part of UA's Digital Media Center.

Tuscaloosa is the 200th largest radio market in the nation. In Fall 2024, of the top-ten-rated radio stations, two were country, two were Christian and one each were urban, gospel, hip hop, talk radio, contemporary, and sports.

Tuscaloosa serves as home base to Alabama Public Radio, the state's largest public-radio network. APR's main studios are housed at the University of Alabama, and the flagship signal, WUAL-FM, originates from a transmitter south of town. WUAL serves Tuscaloosa, portions of the Birmingham metro area and several counties of west-central Alabama. The University of Alabama also houses WVUA-FM, a 24/7 college radio station run completely by students. Clear Channel Communications and Townsquare Media both own and operate a cluster of radio stations in Tuscaloosa, that form the majority of the market.

NOAA Weather Radio station KIH60 broadcasts weather and hazard information for Tuscaloosa and the surrounding vicinity.

== Infrastructure ==
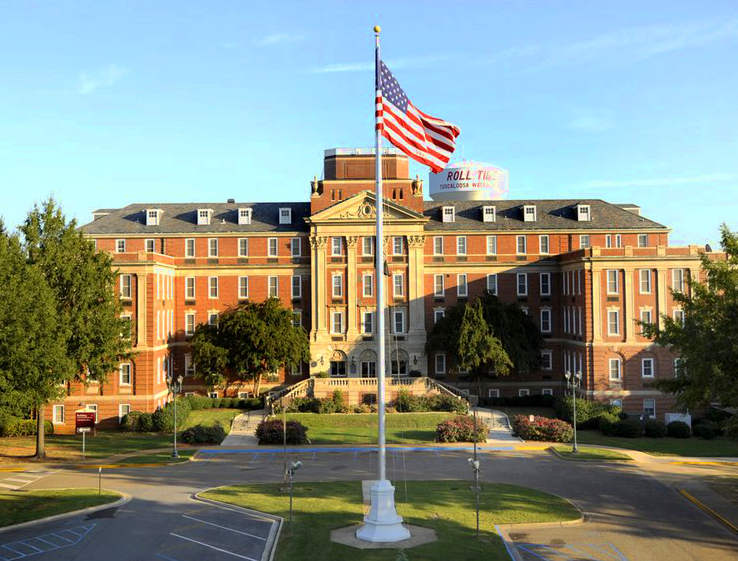
The Tuscaloosa VA Hospital

=== Health and medicine ===
DCH Regional Medical Center is the main medical facility in Tuscaloosa. Operated by the publicly controlled DCH Healthcare Authority, the 610-bed hospital opened in 1916 as the Druid City Infirmary. The emergency department at DCH operates a trauma center (but it is not verified as one by the American College of Surgeons, however) that serves all of west central Alabama and is one of the busiest in the state. The DCH Healthcare authority also operates Northport Medical Center in neighboring Northport.

Other major medical centers in Tuscaloosa include the 702-bed Veterans Affairs Medical Center-Tuscaloosa, the 422-bed Bryce Hospital, Mary S. Harper Geriatric Psychiatry Center, and Taylor Hardin Secure Medical Facility.

=== Utilities ===
Tuscaloosa owns and operates its Water and Sewer system utility. The water system features three lakes and approximately 720 miles of water mains in service and supplies water to nearly 200,000 customers in the metropolitan Tuscaloosa area.

=== Transportation ===
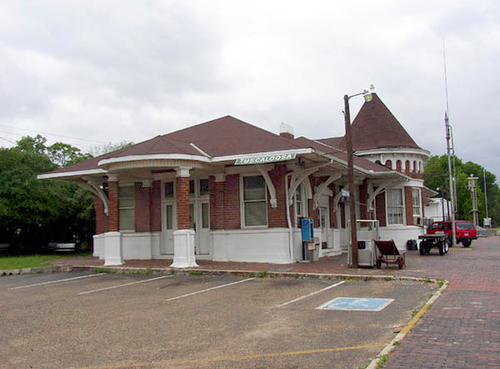
The Tuscaloosa Amtrak Station in 2003. The station is located one mile south of downtown Tuscaloosa.

Tuscaloosa is connected to other parts of the country via air, rail, road and sea. The city lies at the intersection of several highways, including three federal highways (US 11, US 43, and US 82), three Alabama state highways (SR 69, SR 215, and SR 216) and two duplexed (conjoined) Interstates (I-20/I-59). Interstate 359 spurs off from I-20/I-59 and heads northward, ending in downtown Tuscaloosa.

Tuscaloosa also contains one toll road on the Black Warrior Parkway (I-20/I-59), charging $1.25 for automobiles, and one toll bridge (Black Warrior Parkway bridge).

==== Rail ====
Amtrak provides passenger rail service to Tuscaloosa though the Crescent line, which connects the area to major cities along the east coast from New York City to New Orleans. Tuscaloosa station is situated at 2105 Greensboro Avenue, one mile (1.6 km) south of downtown. Norfolk Southern Railway and Alabama Southern Railroad provide freight services to the area. KCS previously provided service to the area before leasing its lines to Watco in July 2005.

==== Bus ====
Greyhound Bus Lines provides passenger bus service to Tuscaloosa. The Tuscaloosa Transit Authority operates the Tuscaloosa Trolley System while the University of Alabama operates a separate bus service known as CrimsonRide. The Tuscaloosa Trolley provides local public bus transportation with four fixed routes that operate Monday through Friday from 5:00 am to 6:00 pm. The trolley's paint job is an illusion; it is an El Dorado Transmark RE bus, painted to look like a trolley.

==== Airport ====
The Tuscaloosa National Airport (KTCL) is 3.5 miles northwest of Tuscaloosa in Tuscaloosa County, Alabama. Owned and operated by the City of Tuscaloosa, the airport is an FAA-designated National General Aviation Airport and Part 139 Certified. Tuscaloosa National Airport covers 826 acres at an elevation of 170’ including two runways: Runway 4/22 is 6,499’ x 150’ and 12/30 is 4,000’ by 100’. Primary services provided by the airport include supporting annual collegiate athletic charters, freight charters in support of the local automotive and industrial community, flight training, transient operations, game day operations, aircraft maintenance, medical services and military flights. The Tuscaloosa National Airport provides an overall $48.6 million annual economic impact for the region.

==== Major highways ====
Tuscaloosa is served by many major highways, including I-20, I-59, and U.S. Route 82. I-20/59 run west to east through the southern part of the city, leading northeast 58 mi (93 km) to Birmingham and southwest 96 mi (154 km) to Meridian, Mississippi. US 82 runs northwest to southeast through the city, locally known as McFarland Boulevard, and leads southeast 103 mi (166 km) to Montgomery, Alabama and northwest 59 mi (95 km) to Columbus, Mississippi. Many other state and local highways run through the city as well, in addition to a tolled bypass on the western side of the city connecting those coming from the west on US 82 to I-20/59 without going through the main part of the city.

==== Port of Tuscaloosa ====
The Port of Tuscaloosa is a river port located in the City of Tuscaloosa and administered by the Alabama State Port Authority.

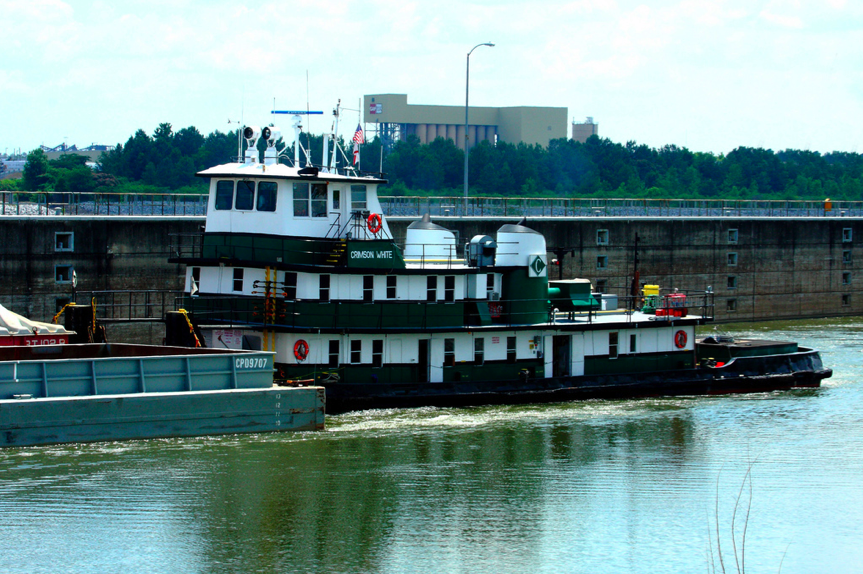
The Crimson White on the Black Warrior River

The Black Warrior River is bounded along nearly its entire course by a series of locks and dams. They form a chain of narrow reservoirs, providing aids to navigation and barge handling as well as hydroelectric power and drinking water. The Black Warrior River watershed is a vital river basin entirely contained within Alabama, America's leading state for freshwater biodiversity. Near Tuscaloosa, the river flows out of the rocky Cumberland Plateau and enters the sandy East Gulf Coastal Plain. Barge transportation in and out of the Port of Tuscaloosa and other commercial navigation make the Black Warrior a silent giant in the state of Alabama's economy. Although the Port of Tuscaloosa is a small one, it is one of the larger facilities on the Black Warrior River at waterway mile marker 338.5. There are no railway connections at this port as they primarily concentrate on the shipment of dry bulk commodities, including lignite, coal and coal coke. The federal government and the City of Tuscaloosa share the ownership of the Port of Tuscaloosa; the operation of the port is leased out to Powell Sales and has been run by them since 1997.

At waterway mile marker 343.2 on the opposite side of the river is a steel company with its own tracks at the rear of the plant connecting with the Kansas City Southern Railroad for barge shipments of iron and steel products such as ingots, bars, rods, steel slabs, plates and coils. Tuscaloosa Steel Corporation was one of the first U.S. steel companies to implement the Steckel Mill Technology.

The Port of Tuscaloosa grew out of the system of locks and dams on the Black Warrior River built by the U.S. Army Corps of Engineers in the 1890s. Its construction opened up an inexpensive transportation link to the Gulf seaport of Mobile, Alabama that stimulated the mining and metallurgical industries of the region that are still in operation.

The Army Corps of Engineers has maintained a system of locks and dams along the Black Warrior River for over a century to allow navigability all the way up to Birmingham. Barge traffic thus routinely runs through Tuscaloosa to the Alabama State Docks at Mobile, Alabama. Via the Tenn-Tom Waterway, the city is connected to the Ohio River valley and beyond.

== Notable people ==
(B) denotes that the person was born there.

=== Arts and entertainment ===
- Paco Ahlgren, writer and financial journalist; author of Discipline
- Annie Greene Brown, born in Tuscaloosa, author of Fireside Battles
- Hannah Brown, born in Tuscaloosa, Miss Alabama USA 2018; contestant on The Bachelor; star of The Bachelorette
- Rick Bragg, Pulitzer Prize-winning author and former reporter for The New York Times; resides in Tuscaloosa
- Willie D. Burton, born in Tuscaloosa, sound technician in the film industry; Academy Award winner for Bird and Dreamgirls
- Frank Calloway, folk artist
- Thad Carhart, author of The Piano Shop on the Left Bank
- Tom Cherones, born in Tuscaloosa, University of Alabama alumnus; television producer and director known for Seinfeld, NewsRadio, and Desperate Housewives
- Chase Coleman, born in Tuscaloosa, actor known for his role in the HBO series Boardwalk Empire
- Mary Dees, raised in Tuscaloosa, film actress during the 1930s, including The Last Gangster and The Women; stand-in for Jean Harlow in Saratoga; appeared in Three Stooges shorts, Marx Brothers comedies, and on Broadway
- Robert Gibson, one-half of the professional wrestling team The Rock 'n' Roll Express
- Frances Nimmo Greene, born in Tuscaloosa, educator, and author
- Vera Hall, folk singer inducted into the Alabama Women's Hall of Fame
- Charlie Hayward, born in Tuscaloosa, musician, and bass guitarist for the Charlie Daniels Band
- Watt Key, born in Tuscaloosa, fiction author best known for Alabama Moon
- Chuck Leavell, raised in Tuscaloosa, member of The Allman Brothers Band, and keyboardist for The Rolling Stones
- William March, highly decorated member of the United States Marine Corps; writer of psychological fiction, including The Bad Seed; buried at Evergreen Cemetery in Tuscaloosa
- Debra Marshall, born in Tuscaloosa, professional wrestler with World Wrestling Entertainment
- Madeline Mitchell, Miss Tuscaloosa and Miss Alabama USA 2011; 2nd runner-up at the Miss USA pageant
- Tim Samaras, storm chaser known for starring in Storm Chasers
- Brandon Scott, born in Tuscaloosa, actor known for his roles in Grey's Anatomy, Wreck-It Ralph, and The Last of Us
- Johnny Shines, musician and member of the Blues Hall of Fame
- Dylan Riley Snyder, born in Tuscaloosa, actor known for his roles in Broadway's Tarzan, the comedy-drama film Life During Wartime, and TV sitcom Kickin' It
- Maria Brewster Brooks Stafford, educator
- Reed Timmer, storm chaser known for starring in Storm Chasers and Tornado Glory
- Dinah Washington, born in Tuscaloosa, blues, R&B, and jazz singer; member of Rock and Roll Hall of Fame
- Kellie Wells, University of Alabama professor and short story writer

=== Politics ===
- Robert J. Bentley, dermatologist and elected governor of Alabama in 2010
- Robert Emmett Bledsoe Baylor, former U.S. Congressman for the 2nd District of Alabama
- Abdurrahim El-Keib, interim prime minister of Libya (2011–2012); lived in Tuscaloosa while a professor at University of Alabama
- Walter Flowers, reared in Tuscaloosa, United States Congressman, served on committee that voted for impeachment of President Richard Nixon
- George LeMaistre (1911–1994), lawyer, banker, and chairman of the Federal Deposit Insurance Corporation (1977–78); publicly challenged Governor-elect George Wallace on segregation in 1962
- Lewis McAllister, Tuscaloosa businessman and first Republican to serve in Mississippi House of Representatives since Reconstruction, 1962-1968
- John McKee, former U.S. Congressman for the 2nd District of Alabama
- Robert Morrow, chairman of Republican Party of Travis County, Texas, considered a conspiracy theorist, born in Tuscaloosa c. 1964
- Condoleezza Rice, lived in Tuscaloosa as a child while her father taught at Stillman College
- Richard C. Shelby, U.S. senator, chairman of the United States Senate Committee on Banking, Housing, and Urban Affairs and Chairman of the United States Senate Appropriations Subcommittee on Commerce, Justice, Science, and Related Agencies
- William Russell Smith, former mayor of Tuscaloosa, U.S. Congressman for the 4th District of Alabama, and member of the Confederate Congress
- Margaret Tutwiler, former resident of Tuscaloosa, served in three presidential administrations, former ambassador to Kingdom of Morocco, under Secretary for Public Diplomacy and Public Affairs in State Department
- Lurleen Wallace, born in Tuscaloosa, former governor of Alabama
- Coleman Young, born in Tuscaloosa, served as mayor of Detroit from 1974 to 1993

=== Sports ===
- Tim Anderson, born in Tuscaloosa, Major League Baseball player for Miami Marlins
- Javier Arenas, lives in Tuscaloosa, NFL cornerback and return specialist for Atlanta Falcons; cousin of Gilbert Arenas
- Ollie Brown, born in Tuscaloosa, Major League Baseball player
- Bear Bryant, lived and died in Tuscaloosa, iconic Alabama coach in College Football Hall of Fame
- Keydren "Kee-Kee" Clark, born in Tuscaloosa, basketball player who averaged 25.9 points per game during NCAA career at Saint Peter's
- Sylvester Croom, born in Tuscaloosa, first African-American head football coach in Southeastern Conference
- Bennie Daniels, Major League Baseball player
- Otis Davis (born 1932), Olympic track and field athlete, gold medals in 400 metre dash and 4 × 400 metres relay at 1960 Summer Olympics, setting a world record in the former event(B)
- Joe Dawson, born in Tuscaloosa, American-Israeli basketball player, 1992 Israeli Basketball Premier League MVP
- George Foster, born in Tuscaloosa, Major League Baseball player
- Butch Hobson, born in Tuscaloosa, Major League Baseball player and manager
- Rusty Jackson, born in Tuscaloosa, punter who played for NFL's Los Angeles Rams and Buffalo Bills
- Kirani James, lives in Tuscaloosa and won gold at London 2012 Summer Olympics in the 400m
- Rob Jones, born in Tuscaloosa, stock car racing driver
- Patton Kizzire, raised in Tuscaloosa, PGA Tour golfer, attended Tuscaloosa High School, and Northridge High School
- Frank Lary, attended University of Alabama, pitcher and 3-time All-Star in Major League Baseball
- Angel Martino, born in Tuscaloosa, Olympic swimmer
- Lee Maye, born in Tuscaloosa, Major League baseball player
- Nate Miller, born in Tuscaloosa, pro football player
- Billy Neighbors, born in Tuscaloosa, football guard for University of Alabama and NFL's Washington Redskins and Boston Patriots; inducted in College Football Hall of Fame 2003
- Willie Nixon, lived in Tuscaloosa for unspecified period prior to career, Negro League baseball player
- Andy Phillips, born in Tuscaloosa, former major league baseball player, and Alabama baseball assistant coach
- Dicky Pride, born in Tuscaloosa, PGA Tour golfer
- Chase Purdy, born in Tuscaloosa, NASCAR driver
- Tike Redman, born in Tuscaloosa, MLB player for Pittsburgh Pirates, New York Mets, and Baltimore Orioles
- David Robertson, raised in Tuscaloosa, attended Central and Bryant High School and University of Alabama, pitcher for New York Yankees
- Mason Rudolph, died in Tuscaloosa, PGA Tour golfer
- Joe Sewell, attended University of Alabama, MLB player in Baseball Hall of Fame
- John Stallworth, born in Tuscaloosa, played football for Pittsburgh Steelers, played in six AFC championships and went to four Super Bowls
- Frank Thomas, lived and died in Tuscaloosa, University of Alabama head football coach
- D. J. White, born in Tuscaloosa, basketball player for NBA's Charlotte Bobcats
- Deontay Wilder, born in Tuscaloosa, boxer, 2008 Olympic bronze medalist and Former WBC World Heavyweight Champion

=== Other ===
- Frank Duarte (born about 1954), laser physicist, taught at University of Alabama
- Sylvia Hitchcock, Miss Alabama USA 1967, Miss USA 1967 and Miss Universe 1967
- William Stanley Hoole (1903–1990), librarian, historian, professor, and writer
- Robert Shelton, Imperial Wizard of United Klans of America
- Shannon Shorr, professional poker player
- James Spann, meteorologist
- Frederick Campion Steward (1904–1993), botanist and plant physiologist, died in Tuscaloosa
- Mary Tillotson, CNN journalist
- Michael Tuomey, first Alabama state geologist
- Robert J. Van de Graaff (1901–1967), designer of the Van de Graaff generator
- Taylor Demonbreun, World Record holder
- Jimmy Wales, Internet entrepreneur and a co-founder and promoter of Wikipedia

== Sister cities ==
The Tuscaloosa Sister Cities Commission was formed in 1986. The city currently has sister city relationships with cities in three countries:

- Narashino, Chiba, Japan
- Schorndorf, Baden-Württemberg, Germany
- Sunyani–Techiman, Ghana (Two cities partnered as one sister city)

== See also ==
- National Register of Historic Places listings in Tuscaloosa County, Alabama
- Properties on the Alabama Register of Landmarks and Heritage in Tuscaloosa County, Alabama
- West End Christian School hostage crisis (1988)
- USS Tuscaloosa, 2 ships
