= USS Tuscaloosa =

USS Tuscaloosa has been the name of two ships of the United States Navy. Both are named for the city of Tuscaloosa, Alabama.

- USS Tuscaloosa (CA-37), a New Orleans-class heavy cruiser, which served from 1934 until 1946.
- USS Tuscaloosa (LST-1187), a Newport-class tank landing ship, that served from 1970 until 1994.
