= 2011 Tuscaloosa–Birmingham tornado =

2011 EF4 tornado in Alabama, U.S.A

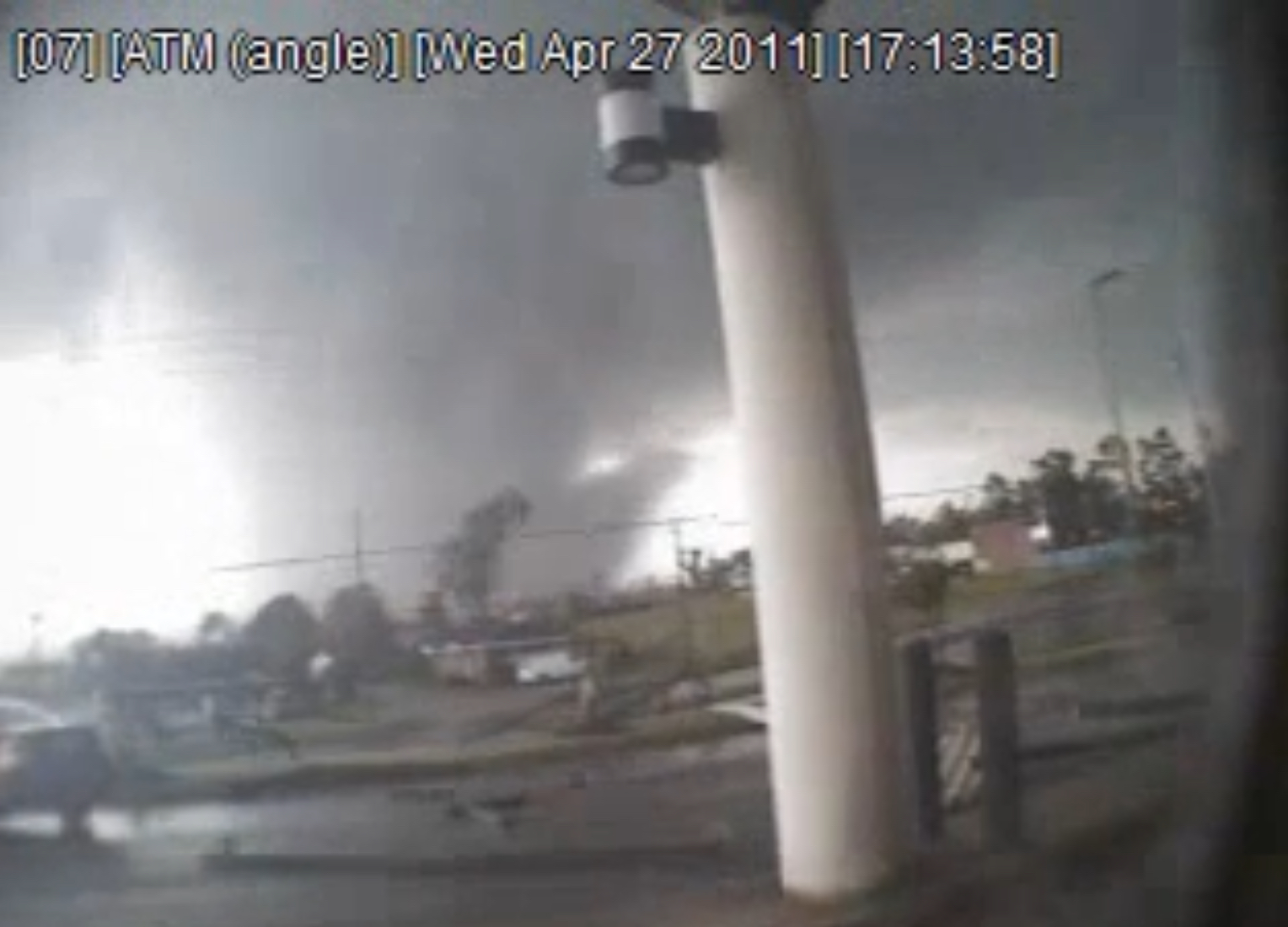
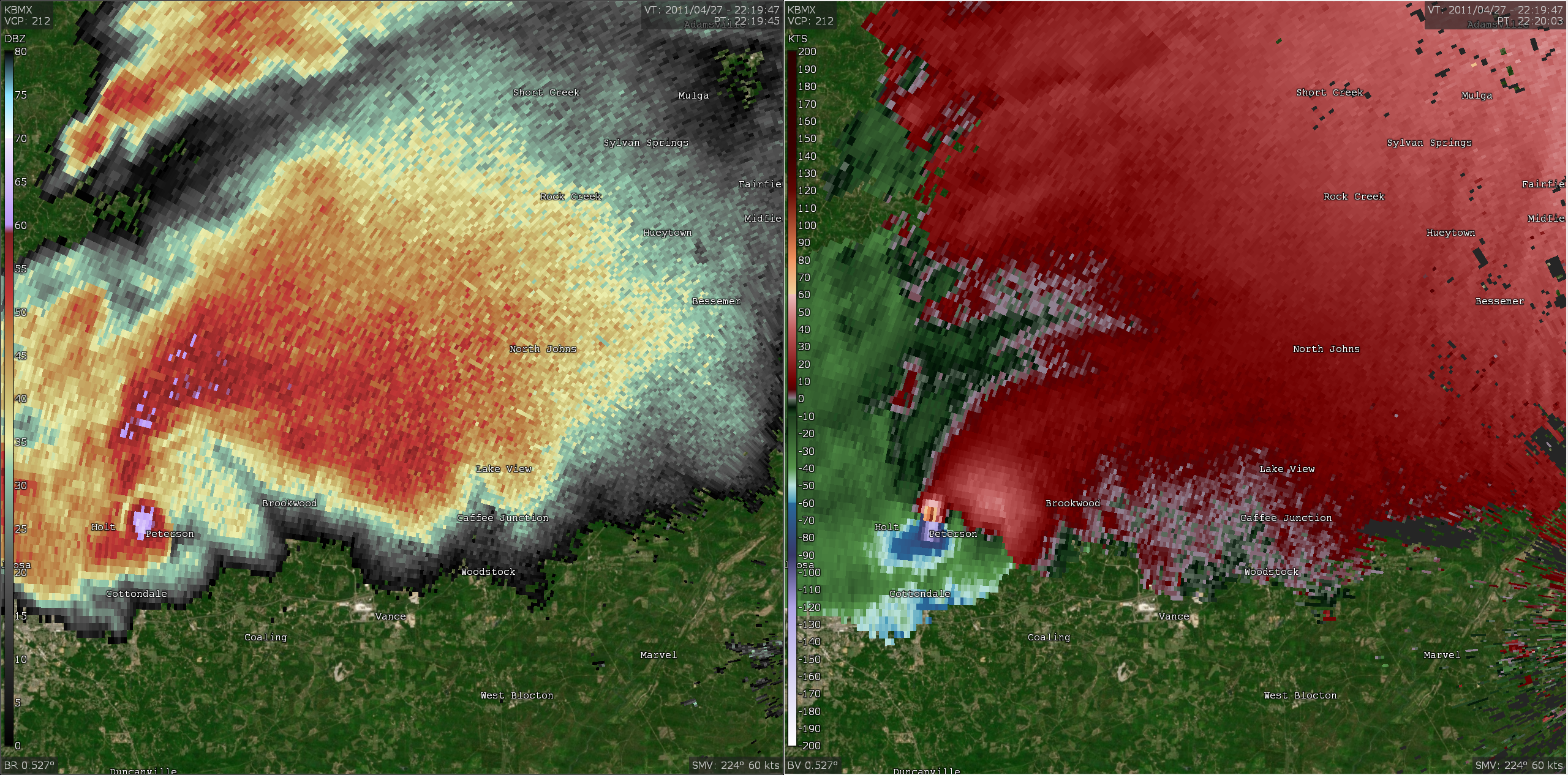
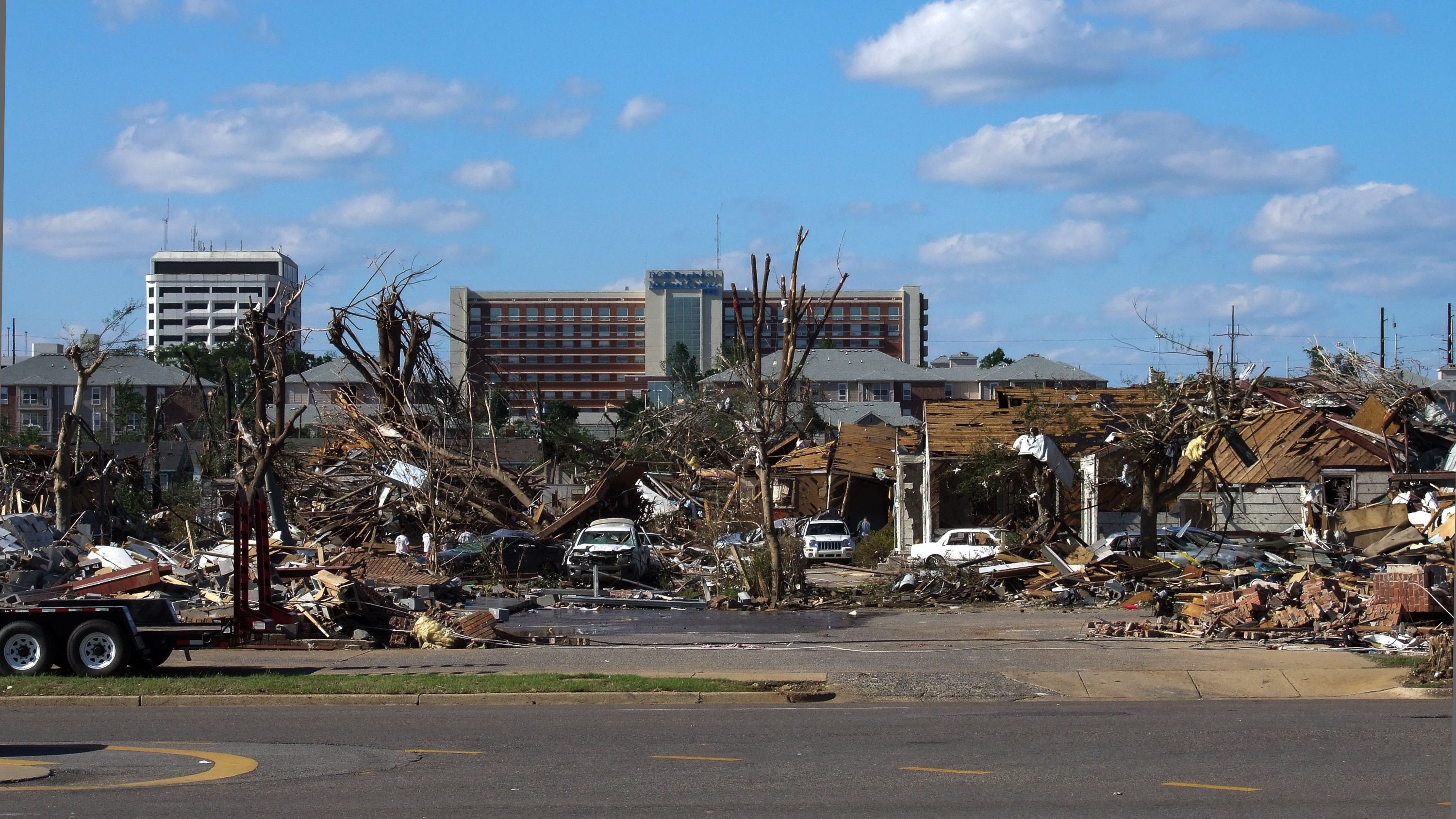
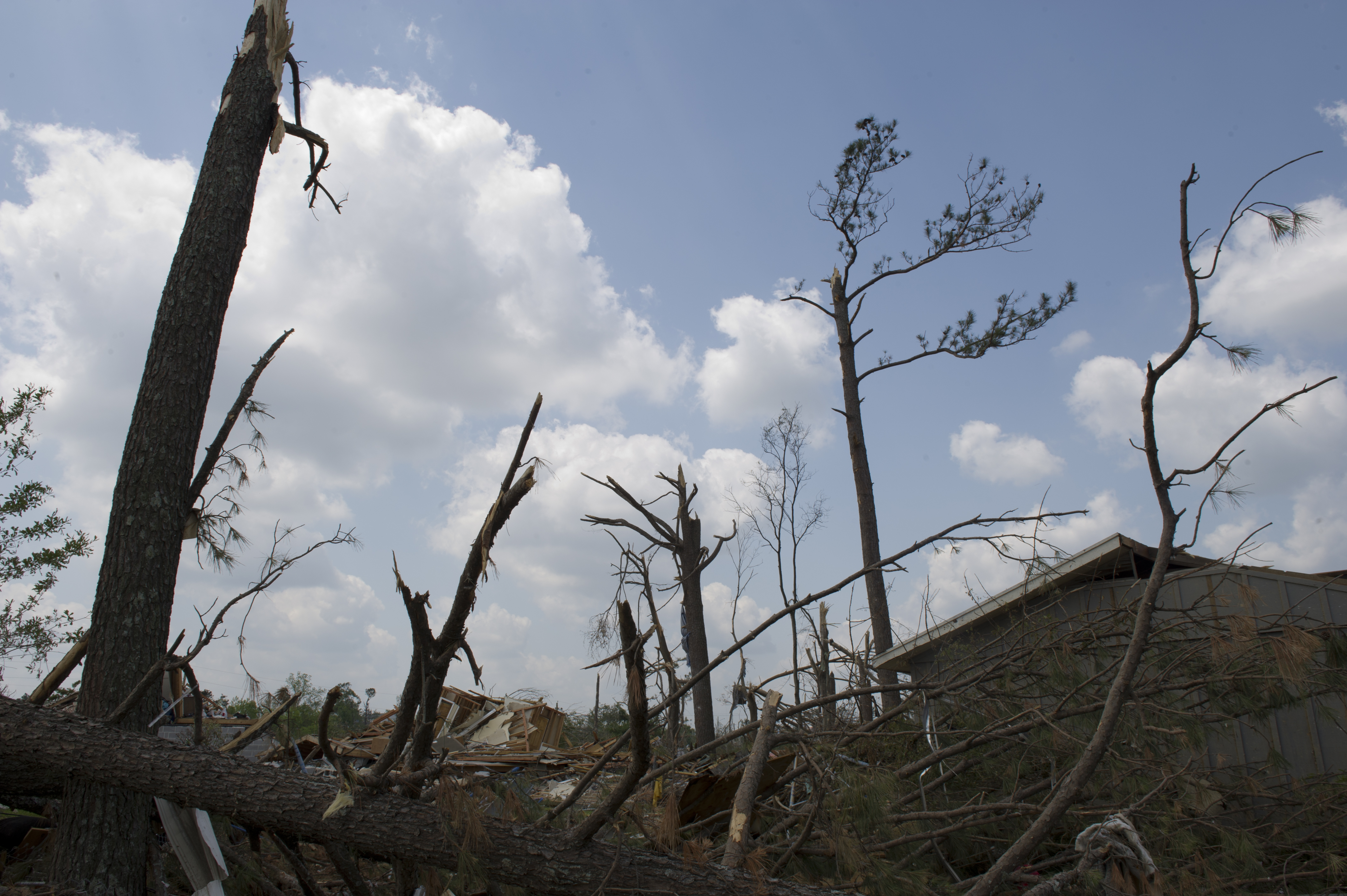
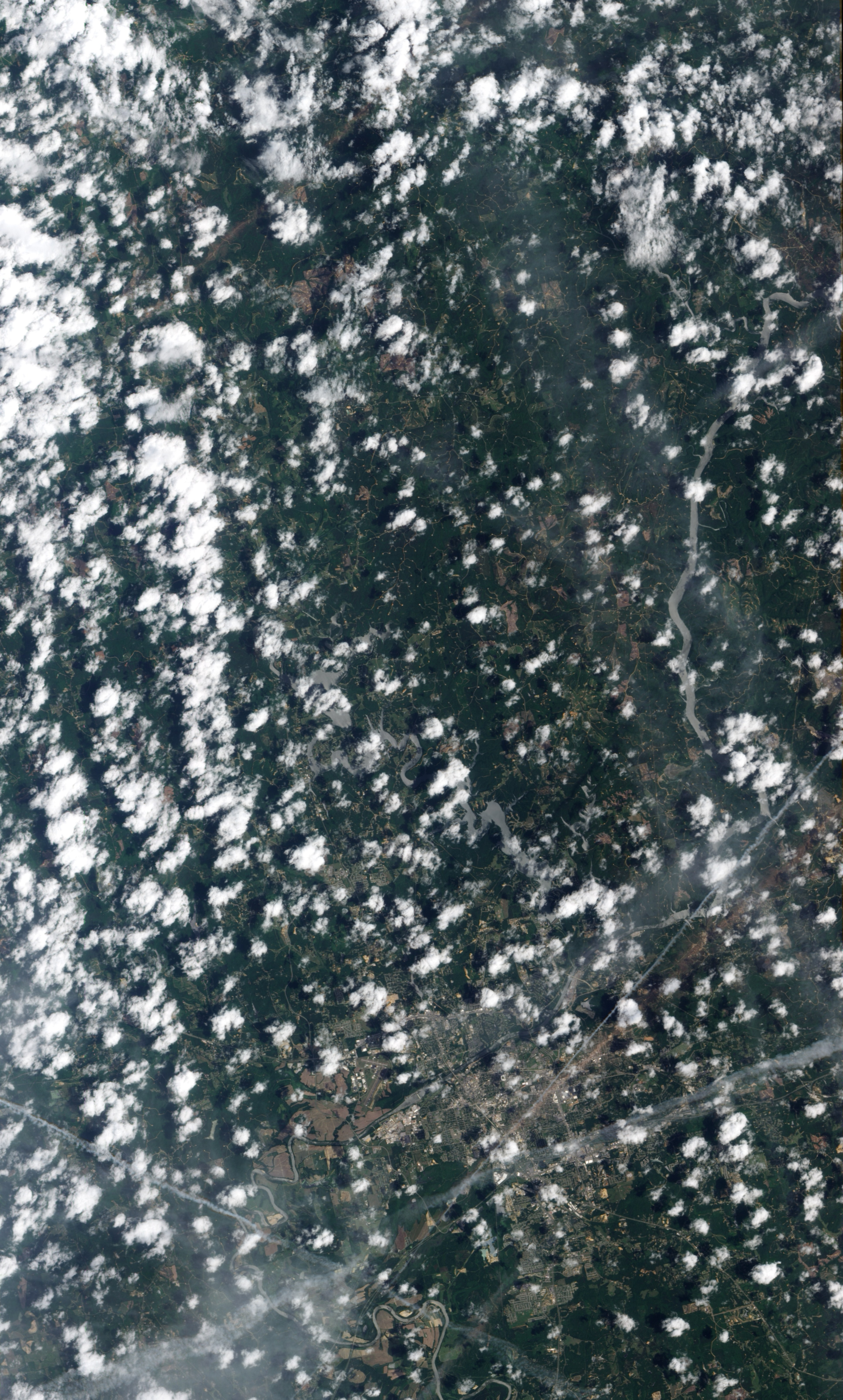
- Clockwise from top: A CCTV still of the tornado in downtown Tuscaloosa; EF4 damage to a home in Tuscaloosa; trees debarked by the violent tornado; radar reflectivity and velocity images of the tornado as it began to exit Tuscaloosa, with a debris ball and tornadic vortex signature clearly visible.

Meteorological history
- Formed: April 27, 2011, 4:43 p.m. CDT (UTC−05:00)
- Dissipated: April 27, 2011, 6:14 p.m. CDT (UTC–05:00)
- Duration: 1 hour, 31 minutes

EF4 tornado
- on the Enhanced Fujita scale
- Max width: 2,600 yards (1.5 mi; 2.4 km)
- Path length: 80.68 miles (129.84 km)
- Highest winds: 190 mph (310 km/h)

Overall effects
- Fatalities: 64 (+8 indirect)
- Injuries: 1,500+
- Damage: $2.4 billion (2011 USD)
- Areas affected: Tuscaloosa to Birmingham, Alabama, United States
- Part of the 2011 Super Outbreak and Tornadoes of 2011

During the late afternoon and early evening hours of April 27, 2011, a violent, deadly, and devastating high-end EF4 multi-vortex tornado, commonly known as either the Tuscaloosa–Birmingham tornado, or more simply the Tuscaloosa tornado, devastated portions of Tuscaloosa and Birmingham, Alabama, as well as smaller communities and rural areas between the two cities. It is one of the costliest tornadoes on record, and was one of the 367 tornadoes that occurred during the 2011 Super Outbreak: the largest tornado outbreak in United States history.

First touching down around 4:43 p.m. CDT in Greene County, Alabama, the tornado rapidly intensified and eventually reached a maximum path width of 1.5 miles (2.4 km) when it crossed I-65 north of Birmingham, and attained estimated wind speeds of 190 mph (310 km/h) shortly after passing through the city. It then went on to impact parts of Birmingham at high-end EF4 intensity, before rapidly weakening and eventually dissipating. In total, the tornado was on the ground for approximately an hour and a half, leaving catastrophic damage in its wake. Multiple television stations captured the tornado live during its track, and it is one of the most documented tornadoes of the entire Super Outbreak due to its proximity to the Birmingham and Tuscaloosa metropolitan areas.

In total, the tornado killed 64 people and injured well over 1,500. This was the third tornado to strike the city of Tuscaloosa in the prior decade, and the second in two weeks. The tornado is the second deadliest tornado in Alabama's history, just behind the Hackleburg–Phil Campbell tornado that occurred on the same day. The tornado caused approximately $2.4 billion (2011 USD), making it the costliest tornado in Alabama history and, at the time, the costliest tornado in the United States, before it was dethroned under a month later by the Joplin EF5 tornado in Missouri. Following the storm, then-President Barack Obama toured the city of Tuscaloosa on April 29 and the wreckage.

== Meteorological synopsis ==
=== Setup ===
The environmental conditions leading up to the 2011 Super Outbreak were among the "most conducive to violent tornadoes ever documented". On April 25, a vigorous upper-level shortwave trough moved into the Southern Plains states. Ample instability, low-level moisture, and wind shear all fueled a significant tornado outbreak from Texas to Tennessee; at least 64 tornadoes touched down on this day. An area of low pressure consolidated over Texas on April 26 and traveled east while the aforementioned shortwave trough traversed the Mississippi and Ohio River valleys. Another 50 tornadoes touched down on this day. The multi-day outbreak culminated on April 27 with the most violent day of tornadic activity since the 1974 Super Outbreak. Multiple episodes of tornadic activity ensued with two waves of mesoscale convective systems in the morning hours followed by a widespread outbreak of supercells from Mississippi to North Carolina during the afternoon into the evening.

Tornadic activity on April 27 was precipitated by a 995 mbar (hPa; 29.39 inHg) surface low situated over Kentucky and a deep, negatively tilted (aligned northwest to southeast) trough over Arkansas and Louisiana. A strong southwesterly surface jet intersected these systems at a 60° angle, an ageostrophic flow that led to storm-relative helicity values in excess of 500 m^{2}s^{−2}—indicative of extreme wind shear and a very high potential for rotating updrafts within supercells. Ample moisture from the Gulf of Mexico was brought north across the Deep South, leading to daytime high temperatures of 77 to 81 °F (25 to 27 °C) and dewpoints of 66 to 72 °F (19 to 22 °C). Furthermore, convective available potential energy (CAPE) values reached 2,500–3,000 J/kg^{−1}.

=== Forecast ===
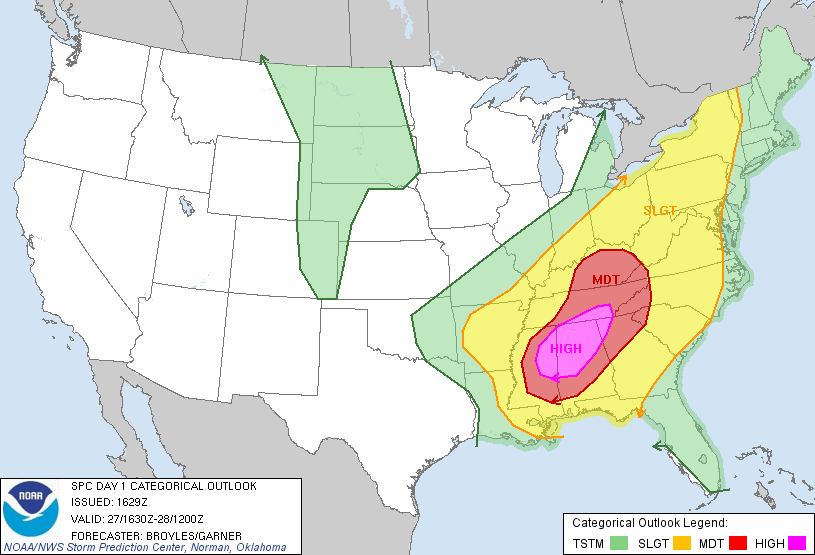
The National Weather Service Storm Prediction Center's Day 1 Convective Outlook for April 27, showing the Categorical Graphic

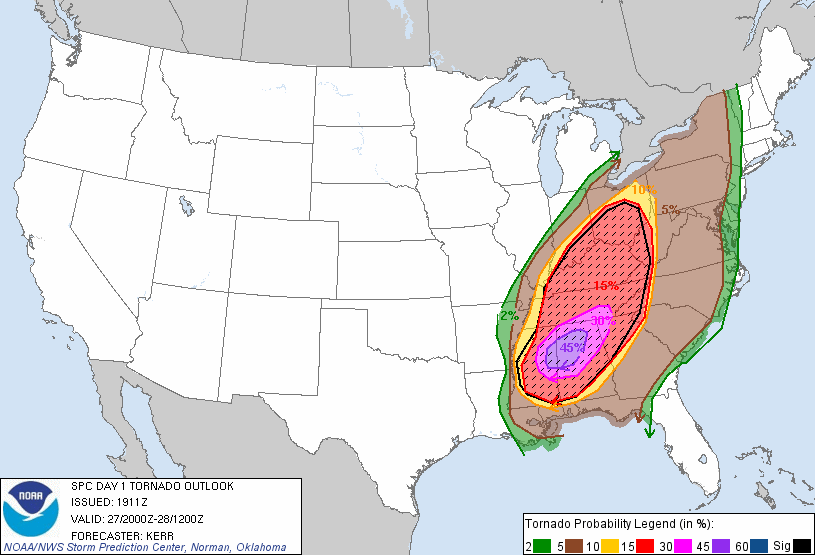
The probability of a tornado within 25 miles of a point (cross-hatched area: 10% or greater probability of EF2+ tornadoes)

On the morning of April 27, a strong cold front with several areas of embedded low pressure extended from the Texas Hill Country northeastward towards the Arklatex and the Ozarks, and later into the lower Ohio Valley. Warm moist air was in place due to strong southerly flow ahead of the front over Mississippi, Alabama, and Tennessee. An upper level disturbance sparked a broad area of showers and thunderstorms as it moved across the frontal boundary on the previous evening. The eastern edge of the line of showers and storms continued to move eastward, in concert with the upper disturbance, reaching the northwest Alabama border around 2:00 a.m. CDT.

This produced the last and most violent round of severe weather, which began around 2:30 p.m. CDT for northern Alabama as supercells began to line up to the southwest of the area. During the early afternoon hours, the potential for destructive tornadoes was highlighted by the Storm Prediction Center's upgrade to a high risk for severe weather around 1:00 p.m. CDT. This prompted a particularly dangerous situation (PDS) tornado watch, which was issued for northern Alabama and portions of southern Tennessee at 1:45 p.m. CDT. The bulletin that accompanied the watch read:

THE NWS STORM PREDICTION CENTER HAS ISSUED A TORNADO WATCH FOR PORTIONS OF: MUCH OF ALABAMA, NORTHWEST GEORGIA, SOUTHEAST MISSISSIPPI, SOUTHERN MIDDLE TENNESSEE, EFFECTIVE THIS WEDNESDAY AFTERNOON AND EVENING FROM 145 PM UNTIL 1000 PM CDT.

...THIS IS A PARTICULARLY DANGEROUS SITUATION...

DESTRUCTIVE TORNADOES...LARGE HAIL TO 4 INCHES IN DIAMETER. THUNDERSTORM WIND GUSTS TO 80 MPH...AND DANGEROUS LIGHTNING ARE POSSIBLE IN THESE AREAS.

The potential for tornadoes ramped up from noon through 9:00 p.m. CDT. During this period, much of Alabama experienced numerous supercell thunderstorms that produced violent tornadoes, one being the Tuscaloosa tornado. Shortly thereafter, at 3:09 p.m. CDT (20:09 UTC), the National Weather Service office in Jackson, Mississippi issued the first tornado warning on the supercell that would eventually produce the Tuscaloosa–Birmingham tornado.

== Tornado summary ==
- Damage survey track of this tornado (centermost red line), as well as the tracks of other EF3+ tornadoes that occurred during 2011 Super Outbreak. (Interactive map, click or tap to view in detail); View mapdata Key EF0 65–85 mph (105–137 km/h); EF1 86–110 mph (138–177 km/h); EF2 111–135 mph (179–217 km/h); EF3 136–165 mph (219–266 km/h); EF4 166–200 mph (267–322 km/h); EF5 ≥201 mph (323 km/h)

=== Formation, Greene County to Tuscaloosa ===
The supercell produced a large wedge tornado in rural Greene County, Alabama, which tracked towards the adjacent Tuscaloosa County at EF2 intensity, uprooting numerous trees and causing minor damage to structures. Near Union at 4:50 p.m. CDT, footage of the wedge tornado was captured by meteorologist John Oldshue during a storm chase for Birmingham ABC affiliate WBMA-LD/WCFT-TV/WJSU-TV (channels 58, 33, and 40 – "ABC 33/40"), which broadcast Oldshue's live video of the tornado as he was tracking it outside of town. This was the first video evidence that the tornado had touched the ground; the video, along with NEXRAD evidence of a tornado debris signature, prompted the National Weather Service office in Birmingham to declare a tornado emergency. Rapidly intensifying, the tornado moved towards the southern and eastern portions of Tuscaloosa at around 5:10 p.m. CDT (22:10 UTC). Skycams operated by Tuscaloosa-based television station WVUA-CA (channel 7) as well as Birmingham Fox affiliate WBRC (channel 6) and ABC 33/40, and a ground-based camera crew with CBS affiliate WIAT (channel 42) captured video of the tornado as it struck Tuscaloosa. The ABC 33/40 feed was periodically disrupted due to power outages caused by wind damage to electrical transformers. As it entered the city, Skycam footage showed surface condensation in the tornado, outside of a visible debris cloud, had briefly lifted; a discernible wedge-shaped condensation funnel, with occasional horizontal and vertical subvortices, subsequently touched back down at the surface as it began moving into neighborhoods in southern Tuscaloosa.

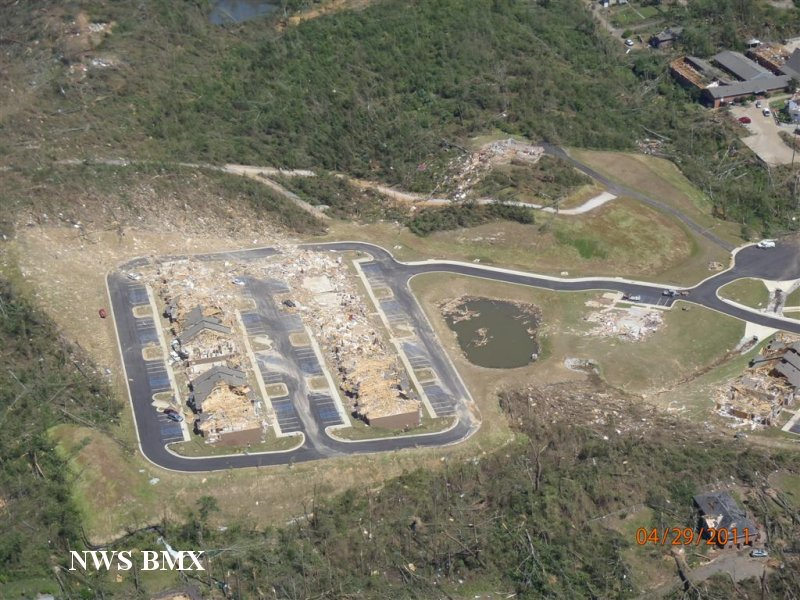
The destroyed Chastain Manor apartment complex near Alberta City, Tuscaloosa. The complex was later rebuilt.

The tornado entered the southern portion of Tuscaloosa as a low-end EF4 and crossed 35th Street, completely destroying a cell phone tower and several warehouses in an industrial area. It passed within a half mile of the Tuscaloosa Police Department Headquarters, forcing the evacuation of the dispatch personnel from the third floor offices until the storm passed. At that same time, the Tuscaloosa County Emergency Management Office sustained a direct hit and was totally destroyed along with most of their equipment and vehicles but with no injuries to the staff present. The tornado then ripped through the neighborhoods of Rosedale and Forest Lake, leveling and sweeping away numerous poorly anchored homes. Several apartment complexes were entirely destroyed in this area, and a few two-story apartment buildings were completely reduced to rubble. The tornado crossed the intersection of 15th Street and McFarland Boulevard, and numerous businesses and restaurants near the University Mall were completely flattened at low-end EF4 strength, and vehicles were either tossed around or destroyed. The nearby Cedar Crest subdivision was devastated as numerous block-foundation homes were leveled. The tornado maintained its strength as it continued through the neighborhood of Alberta City, leveling and sweeping away numerous block-foundation homes, and completely flattening two more apartment buildings and a shopping center along University Boulevard. As the tornado exited the Alberta City section, the Chastain Manor Apartments (which were nailed, rather than bolted to their foundations) were completely destroyed and partially swept away. A well-anchored clubhouse on the property was mostly swept away and its remains were scattered into a pond, even though the structure had lacked interior walls. A nearby manhole cover was removed from its drain and thrown into a ravine.

=== Holt ===
The tornado then grew from 0.5 to 1 mile (0.80 to 1.61 km) wide and ripped through the suburb of Holt, leveling and sweeping away homes while still at low-end EF4 strength. Every tree was snapped in this area, including those within deep ravines. As it crossed Hurricane Creek, it tore apart a large metal railroad trestle, and a 34-tonne (74,957 lb) metal truss support structure was thrown 100 feet (30 m) up on a nearby hill. A marina on Holt Lake was significantly impacted, with numerous boats and a restaurant destroyed; some boats were tossed over 330 feet (100 m) in this area. The tornado exited the Tuscaloosa area and weakened to low-end EF3 status while contracting back to .5 miles (0.80 km) wide. It continued through a dense forest towards Birmingham, this time downing thousands of trees and flattening more rural homes. Numerous trees were completely denuded and debarked as the tornado passed near the rural communities of Searles and Mud Creek, and debris from Tuscaloosa was reported to be falling from the sky across Birmingham over 20 miles (32 km) away in Jefferson County. A total of 44 people were killed in the Tuscaloosa area.

=== Birmingham to I-65 and dissipation ===
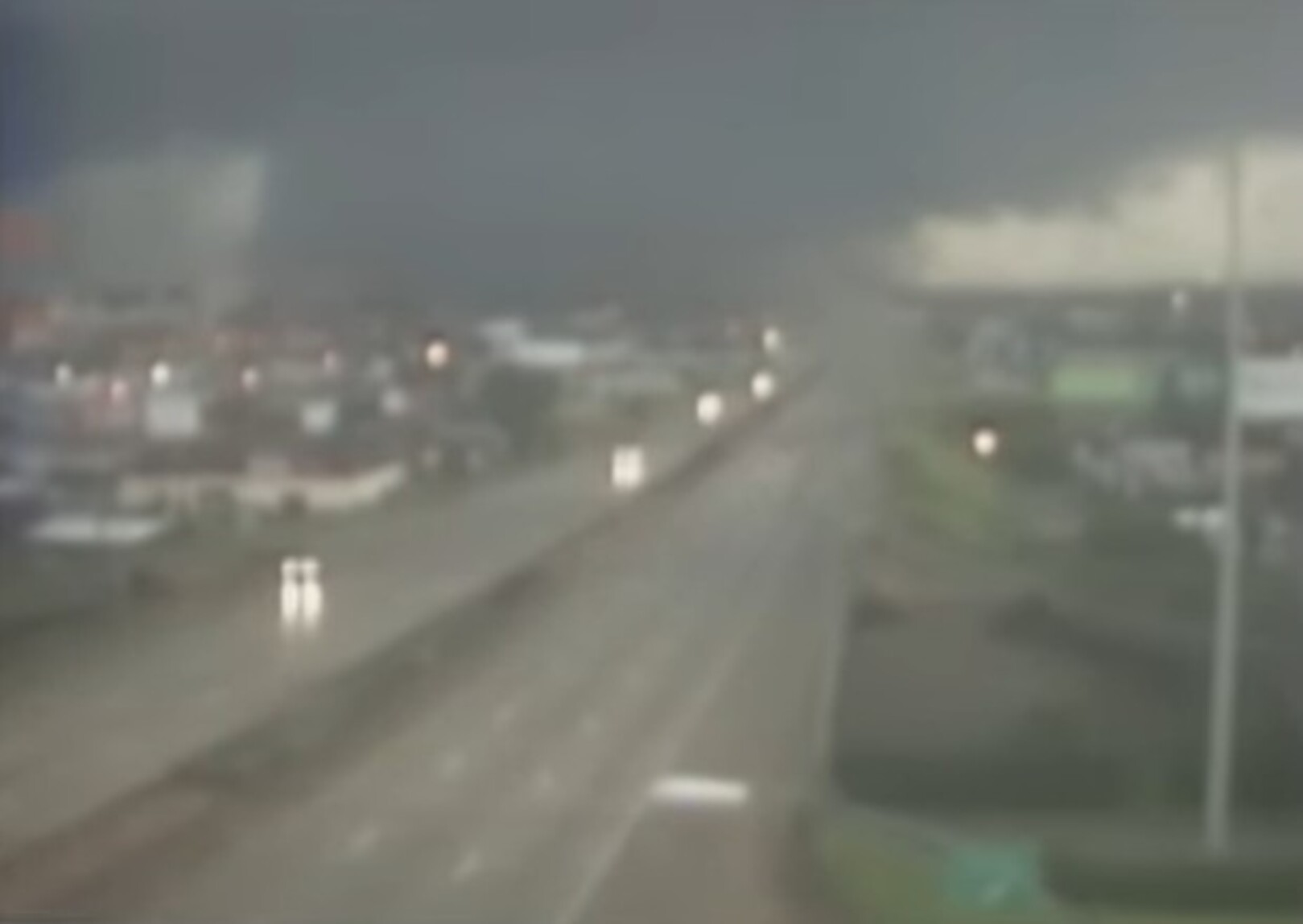
A traffic camera still of the tornado as it tracked through northern Birmingham, Alabama.

After causing massive timber damage in rural areas, the tornado entered Jefferson County and rapidly intensified to its maximum intensity and width. Many stations, including WIAT, the WBMA trimulcast, CBS affiliate WTVY (channel 4) in Dothan and NBC affiliate WSFA (channel 12) in Montgomery, showed television cameras capturing the event as the tornado – which appeared wider than its estimated width during that section of the path as the condensation funnel was partially obscured by a debris cloud and a dense rain shaft – moved east-northeast across the western and northern suburbs of Birmingham at high-end EF4 strength around 6:00 p.m. CDT (23:00 UTC). Several suburbs in the area sustained catastrophic damage from the tornado as it tore through the west side of Birmingham, resulting in twenty fatalities. The suburbs of Concord, Pleasant Grove, and McDonald Chapel, along with residential areas in northern Birmingham itself, were devastated. Extensive wind-rowing of debris was noted in Concord and Pleasant Grove, numerous trees were debarked, and some homes were swept away (though much of the debris remained next to the foundations and was not scattered, and most vehicles were not moved more than 15 yards (14 m)). As the tornado moved across a coal yard in this area, a 35.8-tonne (78,925 lb) coal car was thrown 391 ft (119 m) through the air. Past the coal yard, the tornado weakened to EF2 intensity, but still was able to destroy numerous pier and beam foundations homes and several industrial warehouses in McDonald Chapel. A four-sided brick home in the area also had its roof torn off, but none of its exterior walls collapsed. Numerous homes, apartment buildings, and a large church sustained significant damage as the tornado entered Birmingham's city limits and impacted the neighborhood of Pratt City. Vehicles were also moved, albeit only several feet. The tornado then struck the suburb of Fultondale, damaging homes and businesses in town. Light poles were damaged along Interstate 65, and a Days Inn and several other commercial buildings sustained major damage along US 31 before the tornado began to rapidly narrow and weaken. Some additional EF0 to EF1 damage occurred before the tornado dissipated two miles (3.2 km) north of Tarrant. A total of 20 people were killed throughout Birmingham and its surrounding suburbs.

=== Possible EF5 intensity ===
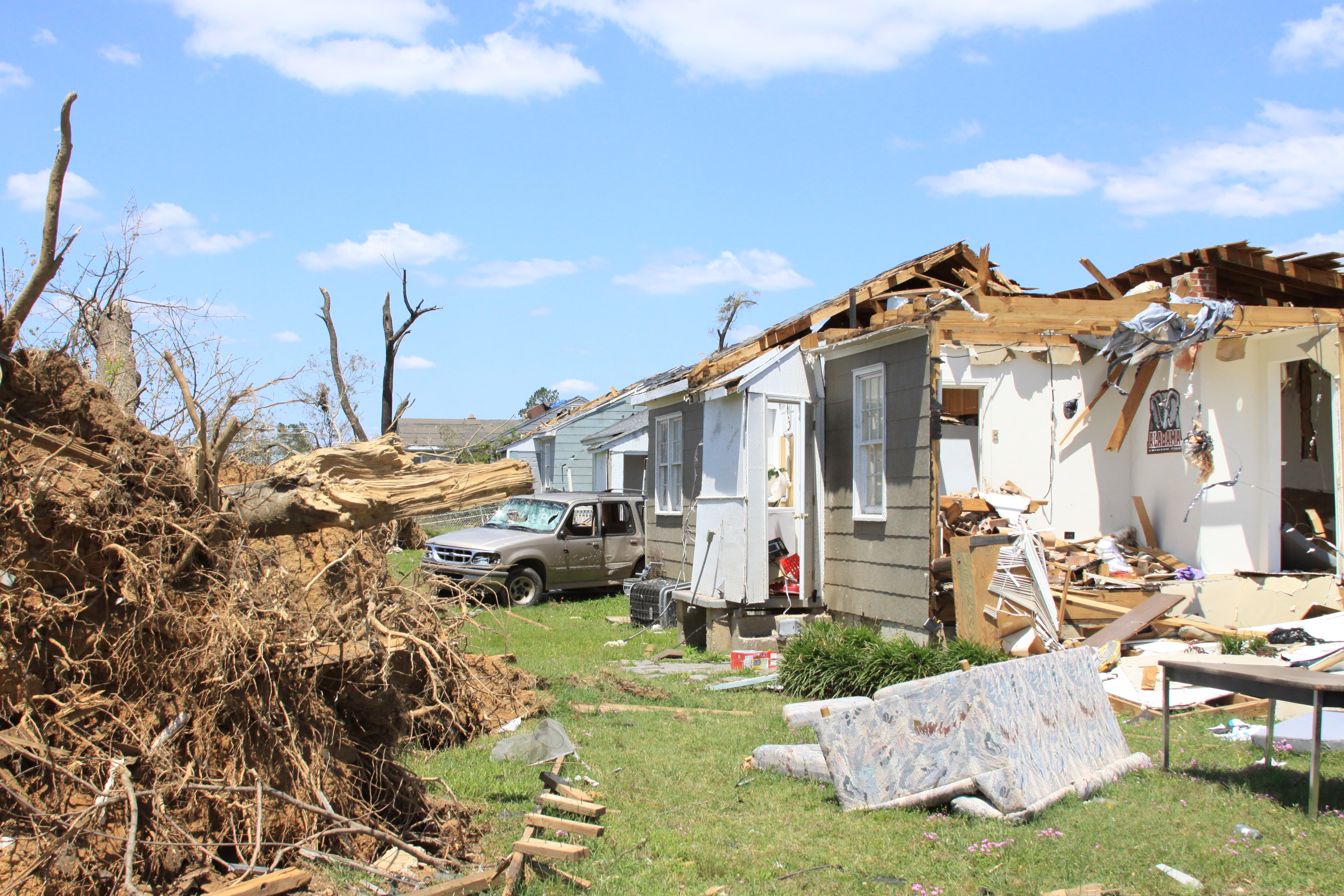
Cleanup in Tuscaloosa's Cedar Crest neighborhood in May (U.S. Army Corps of Engineers photo)

The National Weather Service determined the path length of this violent tornado to be 80.68 miles (129.84 km) with a maximum damage path width of 1.5 miles (2.4 km), or 2,600 yards (2,400 m). The final rating of this tornado was a source of controversy, as some survey teams concluded EF5 damage, while others did not. The structures that were swept away by this tornado were either improperly anchored, lacked interior walls, or were surrounded by contextual damage not consistent with winds exceeding 200 mph (320 km/h), and as a result an EF5 rating could not be applied. Therefore, it was given a final rating of high-end EF4, with winds estimated at 190 mph (310 km/h).

== Aftermath ==
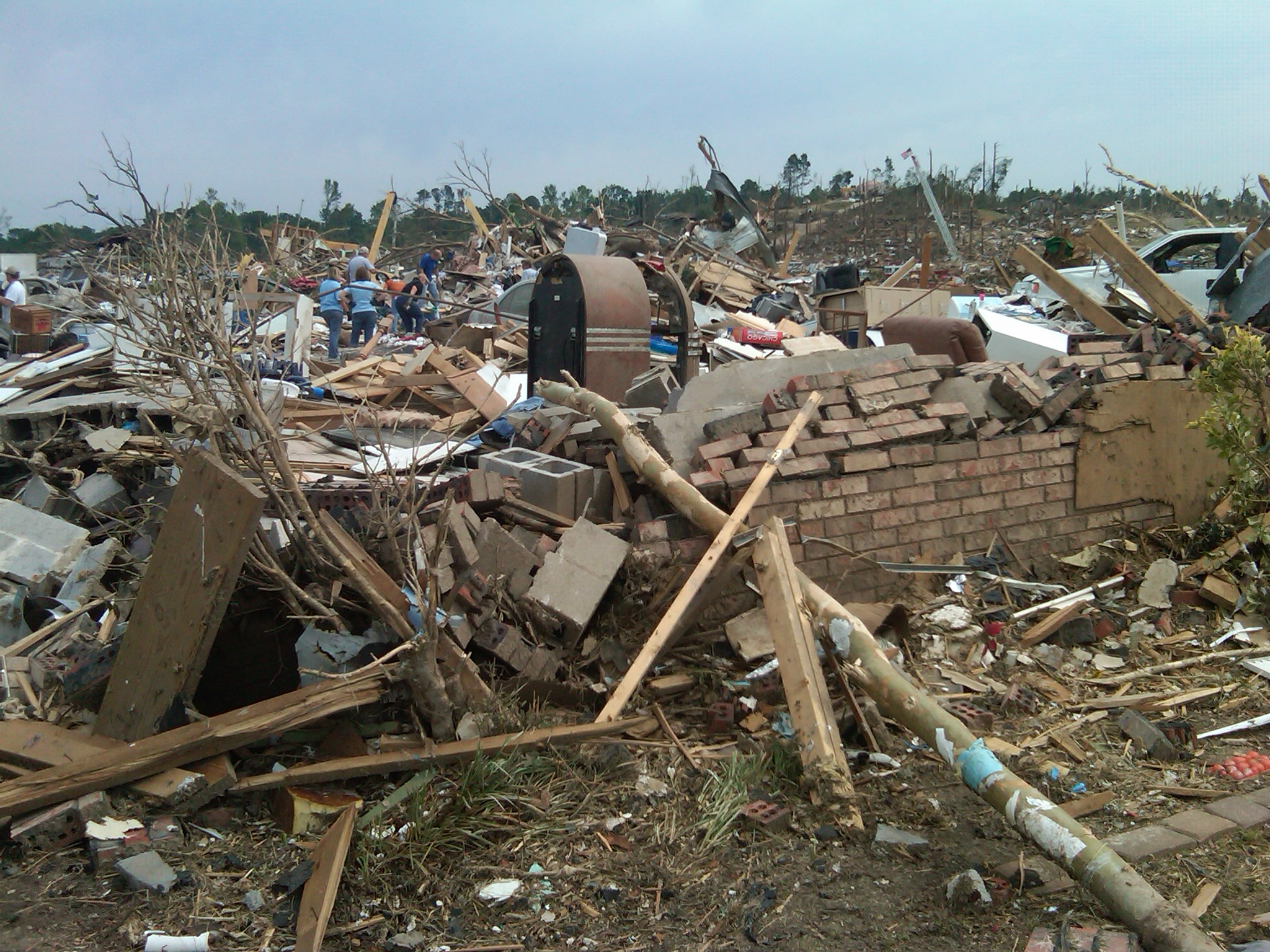
A flattened residence in Concord, Alabama after the EF4 tornado.

By the time the tornado lifted northeast of Birmingham, it had left behind a path of destruction of 80.68 miles (129.84 km) through Greene, Tuscaloosa and Jefferson counties. The tornado killed 64 people, including six University of Alabama students. It caused approximately $2.4 billion of property damage, surpassing the 1999 Bridge Creek–Moore tornado as the costliest single tornado in United States history at that time. Less than a month later, however, this number was surpassed by the Joplin, Missouri tornado, which caused $2.8 billion in damage. Early reports indicated 65 people were killed, with over 1,000 injured. However, this was revised to 64 deaths and more than 1,500 injuries. President Barack and First Lady Michelle Obama visited Tuscaloosa on April 29, taking a ground tour of some of the affected areas. Obama was quoted as saying that he had "never seen devastation like this." He stated further that he had already declared a federal state of emergency in Alabama.

The effects of the tornado arguably contributed to a decrease in affordable housing in what has been called "an uneven recovery" for Tuscaloosa.

== See also ==
- Weather of 2011
- List of North American tornadoes and tornado outbreaks
- List of F4 and EF4 tornadoes
  - List of F4 and EF4 tornadoes (2010–2019)
- Disagreements on the intensity of tornadoes
- Tornado records
- Tornado outbreak of December 16, 2000 – An outbreak that produced an F4 tornado that also hit Tuscaloosa.
- 2011 Hackleburg–Phil Campbell tornado – A similarly deadly tornado that was part of the same outbreak.

Preceded by Bridge Creek, Moore, & Oklahoma City (Metro), OK (1999)	Costliest U.S. tornadoes on Record; April 27, 2011	Succeeded by Joplin, MO (2011)
