= Tornado outbreak of December 16, 2000 =

Tornado outbreak in the Southeastern United States

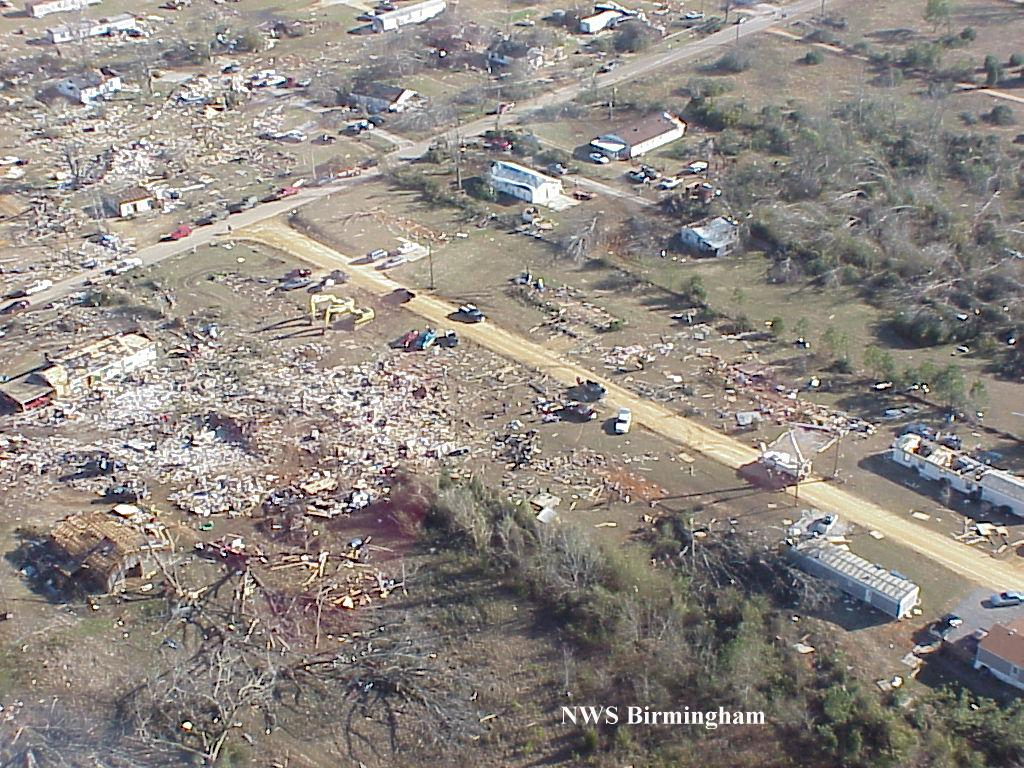
- Damage to trees, homes, and trailers south of Tuscaloosa, Alabama.

Meteorological history
- Duration: December 16, 2000

Tornado outbreak
- Tornadoes: 24
- Max. rating: F4 tornado
- Duration: 13 hours

Overall effects
- Casualties: 12 fatalities, 186 injuries
- Damage: US$ 35 million
- Areas affected: Deep South, Southeastern United States

On December 16, 2000, a destructive tornado outbreak hit the Southeastern United States, from Mississippi to North Carolina. The most significant tornado of the outbreak occurred in communities south and east of Tuscaloosa, Alabama. The F4 tornado killed 11 people and injured more than 125 others; it was the strongest tornado to hit the state of Alabama in the month of December since 1950.

== Confirmed tornadoes ==
Outbreak death toll
State	Total	County	County total
Alabama	12	Geneva	1
Alabama	12	Tuscaloosa	11

Confirmed tornadoes by Fujita rating
FU	F0	F1	F2	F3	F4	F5	Total
0	10	3	9	1	1	0	24

=== December 16 event ===
List of confirmed tornadoes – Saturday, December 16, 2000 (Note: All dates are based on the local time zone where the tornado touched down; however, all times are in Coordinated Universal Time for consistency.)
F#	Location	County	State	Time (UTC)	Path length	Max width	Summary
F2	Geneva	Geneva	AL	16:34–16:40	4.5 mi (7.2 km)	100 yd (91 m)	1 death – 100 homes were damaged and five mobile homes were destroyed in and around Geneva. Many trees were downed, and 15 vehicles were damaged or destroyed as well. The fatality occurred when a woman was thrown 75 yards (69 m) from her destroyed mobile home. Nine people were injured.
F2	W of Dothan to SW of Abbeville	Houston, Dale, Henry	AL	17:00–17:45	29 mi (47 km)	300 yd (270 m)	In Houston County, five homes sustained minor roof damage, along with blown out windows and overturned lawn furniture. In Dale County, several homes in Doe Run subdivision in Pinckard were destroyed. Several other homes and businesses were damaged to varying degrees. A church annex in Midland City lost part of its roof and walls. After crossing into Henry County, the Murphy Feed & Seed warehouse, numerous peanut trailers, and two sheds were destroyed. A textile plant and numerous vehicles were heavily damaged as well. Numerous trees were downed along the path.
F2	NE of Meridian	Lauderdale	MS	17:30–17:45	12 mi (19 km)	440 yd (400 m)	Two homes, three businesses, and thirteen mobile homes were destroyed while 44 homes, 34 mobile homes, and one business were damaged. Thousands of trees were downed, and numerous power poles were downed. There were 17 injuries reported, including one critical.
F1	NE of Courtland	Lawrence, Limestone	AL	18:25–18:31	5.1 mi (8.2 km)	40 yd (37 m)	Several outbuildings and boat houses were destroyed, while three homes were damaged. The tornado crossed Wheeler Lake and dissipated just after entering Limestone County.
F2	NNW of Athens	Limestone	AL	18:38–18:44	4.8 mi (7.7 km)	60 yd (55 m)	Three mobile homes were destroyed, and several frame homes were heavily damaged.
F4	SW of Tuscaloosa to SE of Cottondale	Tuscaloosa	AL	18:54–19:12	18 mi (29 km)	750 yd (690 m)	11 deaths – See section on this tornado – Seen live on WCFT-TV, tower camera. 144 people were injured.
F0	NE of Freeport	Walton	FL	18:55	0.2 mi (0.32 km)	50 yd (46 m)	Several trees were downed.
F1	NE of Ardmore	Lincoln	TN	19:08–19:10	1.5 mi (2.4 km)	50 yd (46 m)	An outbuilding was destroyed, a mobile home was heavily damaged (including loss of its roof), homes sustained minor roof damage, and the roof of a cinder block garage was turned about 90 degrees.
F2	SE of Bonifay	Holmes	FL	19:24–19:30	3 mi (4.8 km)	100 yd (91 m)	Four mobile homes were destroyed, while eight businesses and 39 homes were damaged. Trees and power lines were downed as well.
F0	SE of Marion	Perry	AL	19:29–19:31	0.7 mi (1.1 km)	30 yd (27 m)	Several trees were downed just north of Suttle.
F1	S of Graceville to SW of Campbellton	Jackson	FL	19:50–20:00	5 mi (8.0 km)	75 yd (69 m)	Several mobile homes and carports were damaged, and numerous trees and power lines were downed.
F2	S of Ashville	St. Clair	AL	20:20–20:31	8.5 mi (13.7 km)	200 yd (180 m)	Two mobile homes were destroyed, and four frame homes were damaged. A baseball park at Ashville High School was damaged as well. Two people were injured.
F3	NE of Gadsden	Etowah, Cherokee	AL	20:46–21:05	12.8 mi (20.6 km)	500 yd (460 m)	Major damage occurred in the Coats Bend area in Etowah County, where 250 homes were either damaged or destroyed and fourteen people were injured. In Cherokee County, a few structures were damaged. Numerous trees were downed along the path.
F0	Southeast Bynum	Calhoun	AL	21:17–21:18	0.3 mi (0.48 km)	20 yd (18 m)	Brief, weak tornado with no damage.
F2	W of Albany	Dougherty	GA	21:50–22:05	6 mi (9.7 km)	75 yd (69 m)	Abigail Plantation was heavily affected, with the main house and several surrounding structures being damaged and hundreds of trees being downed. Several homes were damaged, as well as storage buildings at a trailer park, and power poles were downed, causing over 300 outages in northwest Albany.
F0	SW of Deatsville	Autauga	AL	22:55–22:56	0.2 mi (0.32 km)	20 yd (18 m)	Brief tornado with no damage.
F0	S of Tallassee	Macon	AL	23:46	0.7 mi (1.1 km)	50 yd (46 m)	Three homes sustained minor roof and window damage, and two outbuildings and two satellite dishes were destroyed. Several trees were downed as well.
F0	N of Roanoke	Randolph	AL	00:19	1 mi (1.6 km)	40 yd (37 m)	Numerous trees were downed.
F2	ESE of Americus	Sumter	GA	02:30–02:42	10 mi (16 km)	100 yd (91 m)	A wood-frame house was destroyed, with a second being damaged. Three barns and five outbuildings were destroyed, a large camper trailer was overturned, a high-tension power line tower was heavily damaged, and two cattle were killed. Several chicken houses were destroyed, with nearly 400 chickens being killed. Numerous trees and power lines were downed as well.
F0	NW of Calhoun Falls	Abbeville	SC	03:10	0.1 mi (0.16 km)	10 yd (9.1 m)	A satellite dish was torn off a house by this brief tornado.
F0	Spring Lake	Cumberland	NC	05:00	0.1 mi (0.16 km)	25 yd (23 m)	A tornado was observed from Pope Air Force Base; no damage was reported.
F2	S of Augusta	Richmond	GA	05:10–05:20	2 mi (3.2 km)	60 yd (55 m)	This tornado caused extensive damage to a subdivision, along with homes and mobile homes elsewhere along the track. Eight people were injured, one seriously.
F0	SW of Lillington	Harnett	NC	05:10	0.1 mi (0.16 km)	25 yd (23 m)	Windows were blown out of buildings by a brief tornado.
F0	N of Coats	Harnett	NC	05:15	0.1 mi (0.16 km)	25 yd (23 m)	Trees and large tree limbs were downed, a few of which smashed car windows.
Source: NCDC Storm Data

=== Tuscaloosa, Alabama ===
Tuscaloosa, Alabama
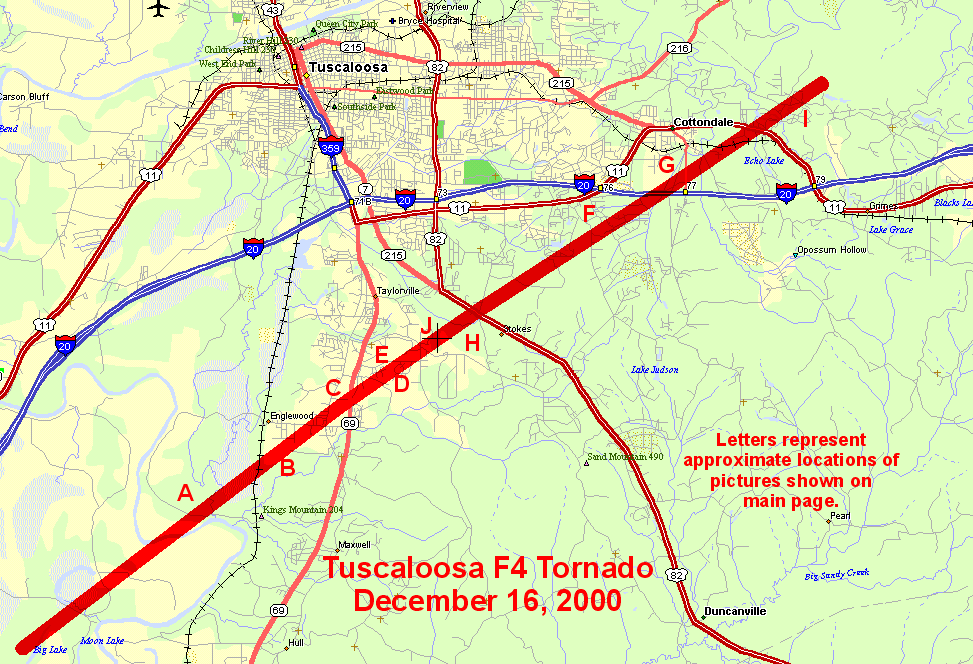
- The tornado's track

Meteorological history
- Formed: December 16, 2000, 12:54 p.m. CST (UTC–06:00)
- Dissipated: December 16, 2000, 1:12 p.m. CST (UTC–06:00)
- Duration: 18 minutes

F4 tornado
- on the Fujita scale
- Highest winds: >210 mph (340 km/h)

Overall effects
- Casualties: 11 fatalities; 144 injuries
- Damage: >$12 million (2000 USD)

This deadly and violent F4 tornado touched down just at 12:54 p.m. CST (18:54 UTC) near the Black Warrior River in southern Tuscaloosa County and proceeded northeastward for 18 miles (29 km) across the communities of Englewood, Hinton Place, Hillcrest Meadows, Bear Creek, and Woodland Forest. A tornado emergency was issued for the area before it lifted near Cottondale east of Tuscaloosa near the concurrent Interstate 20/59. At its peak intensity, the tornado was about 750 yards (690 m) wide. The worst damage was located near the Bear Creek and Hillcrest Meadows areas where F4 damage occurred, and homes were completely leveled. Near I-59/20, several commercial buildings including hotels and restaurants were heavily damaged and a shopping center near Highway 69 was also hit and partially destroyed. Damage was estimated at over $12 million. More than 40 houses and 70 mobile homes were completely destroyed, with hundreds more seriously damaged.

It was the deadliest tornado to hit the state since the Oak Grove-Birmingham tornado that killed 32 people across portions of northwestern Jefferson County on April 8, 1998. That tornado started just northeast of Tuscaloosa during the evening hours, demolishing numerous structures south and west of the Birmingham metro area. Since records have been kept in 1950, the Tuscaloosa tornado is the fourth deadliest tornado in December, tied with an F4 tornado near Murphysboro, Illinois on December 18, 1957. The tornado's fatality count was behind the Bowling Green EF3 tornado from December 11, 2021, which killed 17; the Vicksburg, Mississippi F5 tornado on December 5, 1953, which killed 38 people; and the Western Kentucky EF4 tornado on December 10, 2021, which killed 57 people.

The tornado was part of a supercell thunderstorm that developed across Mississippi before traveling across Alabama, dropping more tornadoes in St. Clair and Etowah counties. Additional tornadoes were confirmed northwest of Birmingham and Jasper.

==== Tower Cam footage ====
The tornado was also captured live on the ABC affiliate WBMA/WCFT/WJSU (channels 58, 33, and 40, generally called "ABC 33/40") in Birmingham during a special severe weather bulletin with meteorologists James Spann, Mark Prater, and John Oldshue. The tornado was caught by the station's tower cam located just outside downtown Tuscaloosa along Interstate 59/20 at Woodland Road on US 82. The National Academy of Television Arts and Sciences gave Spann an Emmy Award for the event. The tornado was followed from Englewood to just near its passage south of downtown Tuscaloosa when the reception was lost due to a torrential downpour.

== See also ==
- Weather of 2000
- List of North American tornadoes and tornado outbreaks
- List of F4 and EF4 tornadoes
  - List of F4 and EF4 tornadoes (2000–2009)
- 2011 Super Outbreak
  - 2011 Tuscaloosa–Birmingham tornado – An EF4 tornado that struck Tuscaloosa and Birmingham, resulting in 64 fatalities.
- Tornado outbreak of April 14–16, 2011 – An EF3 tornado took a very similar track to the 2000 tornado.
