= Alabama State Route 215 =

State highway in Alabama, United States

State Route 215

Route information
- Maintained by ALDOT
- Length: 12.1 mi (19.5 km)

Major junctions
- South end: US 82 in Tuscaloosa
- SR 216 in Tuscaloosa
- North end: US 11 in Cottondale

Location
- Country: United States
- State: Alabama
- Counties: Tuscaloosa

Highway system
- Alabama State Highway System; Interstate; US; State
← SR 213	→ SR 216

State Route 215 (SR 215) is a numbered state highway in Tuscaloosa County, Alabama. SR 215 partially follows the former routes of U.S. Route 82 (US 82) and US 11. The route stays almost completely within the city limits of Tuscaloosa.

== Route description ==
The 8-mile (13 km) highway is unusual in that it follows both a north–south and east–west routing (though it is signed as north–south for its entire route). The highway follows the former routing of US 82 and formerly followed the former routing of US 11. Thus, it does not act as a true bypass for either route. Even more strangely, the north–south section parallels US 82, an even-numbered (and therefore east–west) US highway, while the east–west section follows US 11, which is odd-numbered and thus follows a north–south route.

The north–south section is named Old Montgomery Highway and Greensboro Avenue while the east–west section was formerly routed on University Boulevard. In 2015, in order to divert traffic from the campus of the University of Alabama, the east-west segment of the route was removed from University Boulevard and diverted onto Veterans Memorial Parkway, which becomes 15th Street at its intersection with US 82. The route changes direction at the intersection of Greensboro Avenue and 15th Street south of downtown Tuscaloosa.

== Major intersections ==
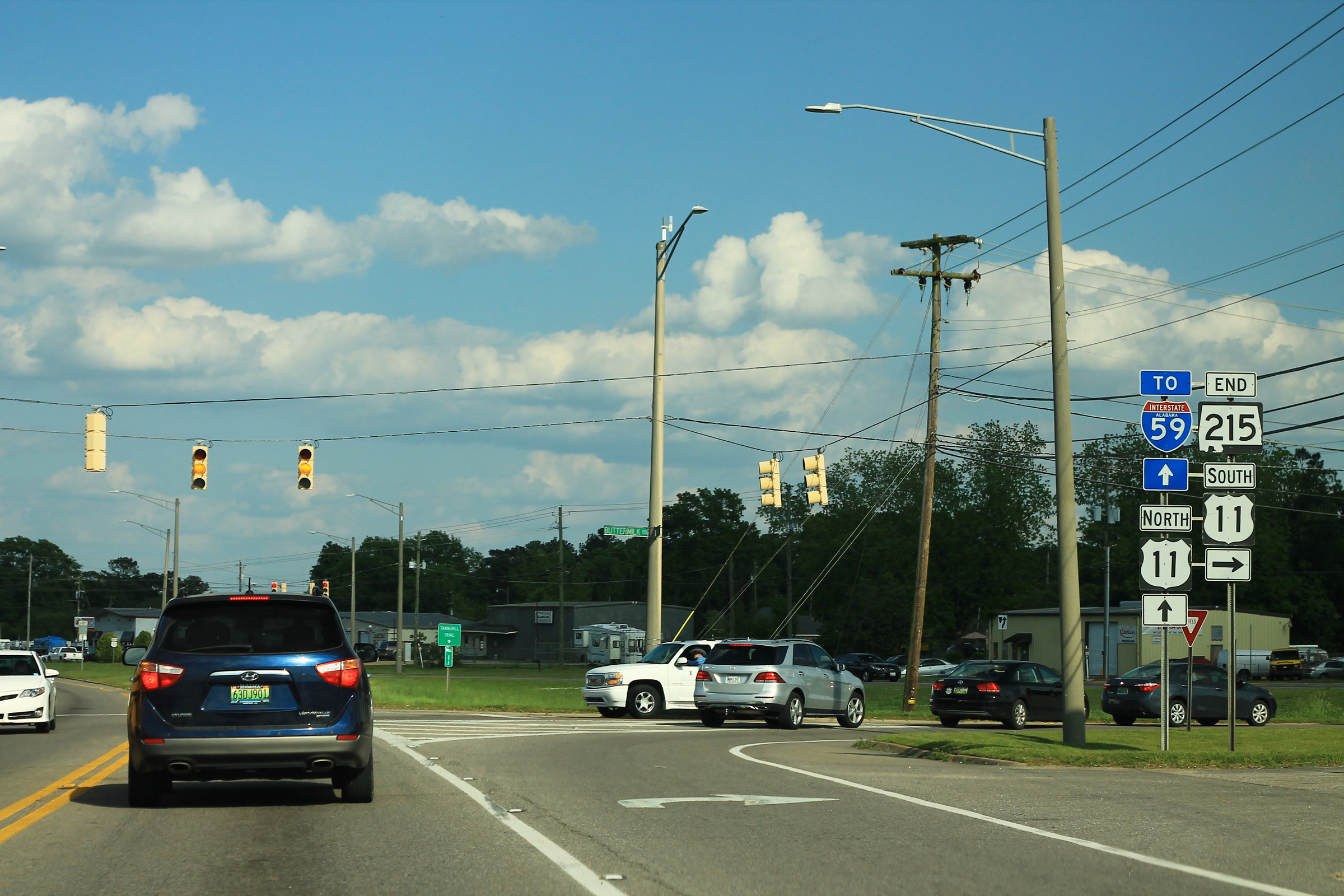
Northern terminus in Cottondale

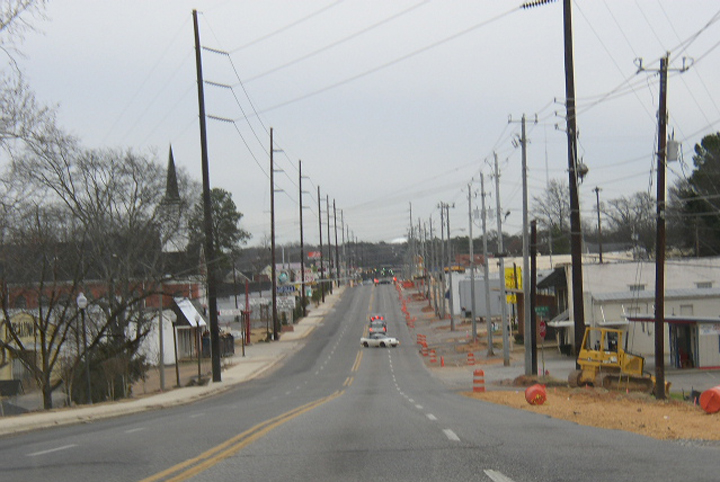
University Boulevard (the former routing of State Route 215) in Alberta City, Tuscaloosa

The entire route is in Tuscaloosa County.

Location	mi	km	Destinations	Notes
Tuscaloosa	0.0	0.0	US 82 (McFarland Boulevard East/SR 6)	Southern terminus
Tuscaloosa	1.8	2.9	US 11 (Skyland Boulevard/SR 7) – Moundville, Columbus, Birmingham	
Tuscaloosa	7.8	12.6	US 82 (McFarland Boulevard East/SR 6)	
Tuscaloosa	10.7	17.2	SR 216 (Old Birmingham Highway) – Brookwood	
Cottondale	12.1	19.5	US 11 (Skyland Boulevard East/SR 7) – Bessemer, Birmingham	Northern terminus
1.000 mi = 1.609 km; 1.000 km = 0.621 mi
