= James Spann =

American meteorologist

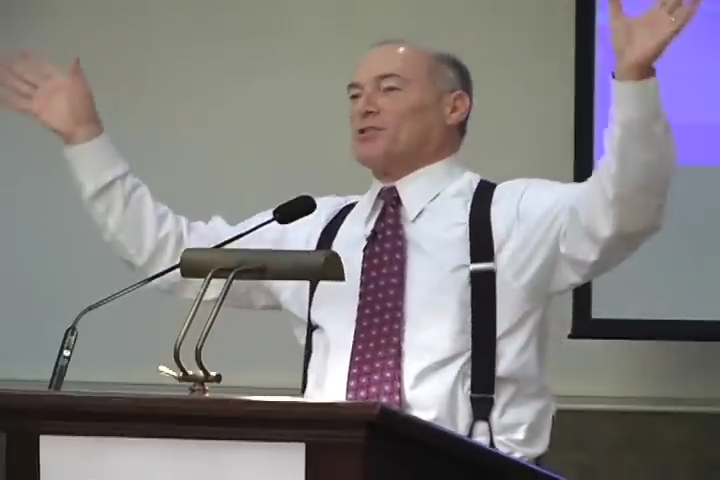
- Spann in 2012
- Born: James Max Spann Jr. June 6, 1956 (age 70); Huntsville, Alabama, U.S.
- Education: University of Alabama (no degree); Mississippi State University (Cert)
- Occupation: Broadcast meteorologist
- Years active: 1973–present
- Employer: ABC 33/40 (WBMA-LD)
- Spouse: Karen Spann (m. 1981)
- Children: 2
- Awards: Emmy award, 2001; NWA Broadcaster of the Year; AMS Award for Broadcast Meteorology; NATAS Silver Circle Award; Hon. LL.D.

James Max Spann Jr. (born June 6, 1956) is an American broadcast meteorologist and podcast host based in Birmingham, Alabama. He is the founder of The Alabama Weather Network, which provides statewide live weather coverage and regularly posts video weather updates during the early morning and afternoon, Monday through Friday. Spann also serves as the chief meteorologist for ABC 33/40 (WBMA-LD), the ABC-affiliated television station in Birmingham. Spann has worked in the field since 1978. He also hosts the podcast WeatherBrains.

== Early life and education ==
Spann was born on June 6, 1956, in Huntsville, Alabama, to Max and Carolyn Spann (1932–2018). As a child, he and his family moved to Greenville in Butler County. His mother worked as a secretary at Greenville High School, while his father sold lumber.

When Spann was seven his father left the family, leaving Carolyn to raise him. After Spann finished the fourth grade, he and his mother moved to Tuscaloosa, so that his mother could complete her education at the University of Alabama and become a schoolteacher.

He graduated from Tuscaloosa High School in 1974 and enrolled at the University of Alabama to study electrical engineering. In 1975, he became a member of the Theta Tau professional engineering fraternity. Spann earned a certificate in broadcast meteorology from Mississippi State University in 1992.

== Career ==
Spann began his broadcast career in Tuscaloosa in 1973 at WTBC radio. There, in high school, he worked the night shift, while former ABC 33/40 anchor Dave Baird worked mornings. Spann volunteered many hours following the 1974 Alabama tornadoes in Jasper.

Channel 13 was sold to Times Mirror in 1980 and renamed WVTM-TV, and Spann was moved to sister station KDFW in Dallas in 1984. Spann left WBRC in 1996 to the newly formed ABC 33/40, which had merged WCFT with WJSU-TV in Anniston and a new low-power repeater in Birmingham (WBMA-LD), and had replaced WBRC as Birmingham's ABC affiliate. He has been at ABC 33/40 ever since. Since its inception in 2006, he hosts the weekly weather podcast WeatherBrains.

On April 27, 2011, Spann and fellow meteorologist Jason Simpson did over 12 hours of live coverage during the largest tornado outbreak in recorded history for both the morning squall line and afternoon supercells. On air, Spann stated that the day "would go down in state history ... and all you can do is pray for those people".

On August 11, 2025, Spann founded the Alabama Weather Network, which provides live coverage for the entire state of Alabama, stating that the channel had "...been a long dream of mine." While Spann remains the chief meteorologist for ABC 33/40, he also appears on his new network and maintains a close partnership with ABC 33/40.

=== Awards ===
Spann was the 33rd person in the United States to receive the American Meteorological Society (AMS) distinction as a Certified Broadcast Meteorologist.

He won an Emmy Award with John Oldshue from the National Academy of Television Arts and Sciences for live coverage of a deadly tornado in Tuscaloosa, Alabama on December 16, 2000. (A camera mounted on the transmitter tower of the former Channel 33 captured live images of the tornado as it moved through the community.) The station won an RTNDA Edward R. Murrow Award for this coverage.

Spann received two major national awards following his live coverage of the April 2011 Super Outbreak, which claimed over 250 lives, and had over 50 tornadoes. The National Weather Association named him Broadcaster of the Year, in recognition of his "passionate dedication to serving the Central Alabama community with critical weather information for over 30 years, especially during the deadly April 27, 2011, tornado outbreak". The American Meteorological Society also awarded Spann the Award for Broadcast Meteorology "for his tireless efforts to advance the public's awareness of, and engagement in, the science of meteorology, particularly severe weather forecasting and response."

== Personal views ==
=== Global warming ===
In January 2007, Spann gained notoriety as a climate change denier. He asserts that climate change is naturally caused, as part of the climate's cyclical nature. In a VICE news interview in 2018, Spann told the host that "I do weather, not climate" and that they should "ask a climatologist" for more information.

Spann's original viewpoints have been criticized by many in the meteorology community. In a blog post for Inside Climate News, Katherine Bagley explained that the short-term models used by many TV weather forecasters are too short-term to demonstrate long-term climate patterns, and that most meteorology degrees do not include any education on climate or climate change.

Spann was countering a statement made by Heidi Cullen, a staff meteorologist with The Weather Channel, who had written that those who disagreed with the view that global warming was caused by man-made events should not be given the Seal of Approval by the American Meteorological Society. Spann's remarks in his station's weather blog were linked to by the Drudge Report, which thrust Spann — a well-known personality in north and central Alabama, but little known outside that area — into the larger spotlight. As of 2011, Spann has the most followers on Twitter and the most fans on Facebook of any local television meteorologist.

Spann is also a signatory of the Cornwall Alliance for the Stewardship of Creation, Which states: "We believe Earth and its ecosystems — created by God's intelligent design and infinite power and sustained by His faithful providence — are robust, resilient, self-regulating, and self-correcting, admirably suited for human flourishing, and displaying His glory. Earth's climate system is no exception".

=== "Siren mentality" ===
During his career, Spann has spoken and done interviews on the alarm fatigue phenomenon, which he has deemed the "siren mentality". In a February 2011 of The Tuscaloosa News, Spann stated that “It's World War I technology, like air raid sirens,” referring to the sirens used to warn the public of tornadoes. Spann also stated in April 2021 “I just want to take them down and burn them”.

== See also ==
- List of meteorologists
