= Alberta City, Tuscaloosa =

Alberta City
- Suburb
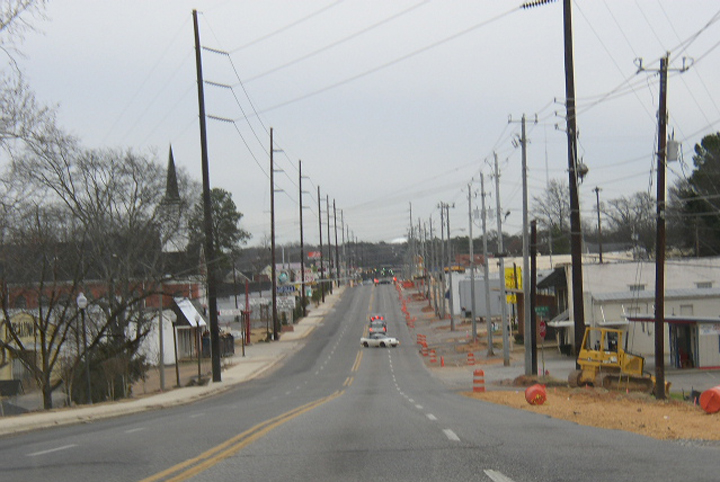
- University Boulevard traveling east through Alberta City in 2003. Much of the suburb was reduced to vacant lots after the tornado outbreak of 2011.
- Interactive map of Alberta City
- Coordinates: 33°12′25″N 87°30′27″W
- Country: United States
- State: Alabama
- City: Tuscaloosa
- Elevation: 299 ft (91 m)
- Time zone: UTC-6 (CST)
  - Summer (DST): UTC-5 (CDT)
- ZIP Codes: 35404
- Area codes: 205, 659

Alberta City is the name of a suburban area of Tuscaloosa, Alabama, United States. Alberta City is located in the northeastern portion of Tuscaloosa and is generally defined as encompassing the portions of the city east of U.S. Route 82 (McFarland Boulevard), west of Holt, south of the Black Warrior River and north of Veterans Memorial Parkway.

== History ==
With its founding in 1912 and much of its early development tracing to the early 20th Century, what is present-day Alberta City was annexed into Tuscaloosa on September 21, 1948.

=== 2011 tornado ===
On April 27, 2011, Alberta City suffered the heaviest damage from a tornado that destroyed 12% of greater Tuscaloosa, including residences, churches, and stores. The suburb's landscape was changed significantly as numerous properties, homes, and businesses were completely destroyed and left as flat vacant lots after demolitions and debris clean-up. Two police stations, a postal office, and elementary, middle, and primary day care schools were all damaged beyond repair or destroyed. Alberta City has undergone slow, gradual reconstruction ever since, largely due to revitalization efforts from the Tuscaloosa city government and from private investors and businesses seeing potential in the area due to its close proximity to the University of Alabama's main campus.

By 2021, reconstruction remained gradual as some commercial and residential sections of Alberta City remained in visible urban decay due to minimal private investment and negligent property development on the many vacant lots. Continued public investment and the presence of anchor stores have slowly facilitated recovery efforts.

== Demographics ==
Alberta City never reported a population separately as an unincorporated community on the U.S. Census according to the census returns from 1850 until its annexation into Tuscaloosa in 1948.

== Infrastructure ==
=== Transportation ===
The neighborhood is serviced by both Alabama State Route 215 (University Boulevard) and U.S. Route 82 (McFarland Boulevard). Public transportation is provided via public bus serviced by the Tuscaloosa Transit Authority's Holt Route.

== See also ==
- Cottondale, Alabama — an adjacent unincorporated community in Tuscaloosa County
- Holt, Alabama — a nearby unincorporated community in Tuscaloosa County
