= Holt, Alabama =

- Census-designated place (CDP) & Unincorporated community
- Location in Tuscaloosa County and the state of Alabama
- Coordinates: 33°14′20″N 87°29′10″W
- Country: United States
- State: Alabama
- County: Tuscaloosa

Area
  - Total: 3.18 sq mi (8.23 km^{2})
  - Land: 3.16 sq mi (8.19 km^{2})
  - Water: 0.015 sq mi (0.04 km^{2})
- Elevation: 361 ft (110 m)

Population (2020)
  - Total: 3,413
  - Density: 1,078.8/sq mi (416.52/km^{2})
- Time zone: UTC-6 (Central (CST))
  - Summer (DST): UTC-5 (CDT)
- ZIP code: 35404
- Area codes: 205, 659
- FIPS code: 01-35704
- GNIS feature ID: 2402595

Holt is an unincorporated community and census-designated place (CDP) in Tuscaloosa County, Alabama, United States. At the 2020 census, the population was 3,413. It is part of the Tuscaloosa, Alabama Metropolitan Statistical Area.

== Geography ==
According to the U.S. Census Bureau, the community has a total area of 3.2 square miles (8.3 km^{2}), all land.

== Demographics ==
Historical population
Census	Pop.	Note	%±
1950	2,453		—
1990	4,125		—
2000	4,103		−0.5%
2010	3,638		−11.3%
2020	3,413		−6.2%
U.S. Decennial Census

Holt first appeared on the census in 1950 as the unincorporated community of Holt-Fox. It did not reappear again until 1990 when it was classified as a census-designated place (CDP) as Holt.

=== Racial and ethnic composition ===
Holt CDP, Alabama – Racial and ethnic composition Note: the US Census treats Hispanic/Latino as an ethnic category. This table excludes Latinos from the racial categories and assigns them to a separate category. Hispanics/Latinos may be of any race.
Race / Ethnicity (NH = Non-Hispanic)	Pop 1990	Pop 2000	Pop 2010	Pop 2020	% 1990	% 2000	% 2010	% 2020
White alone (NH)	2,697	2,087	1,316	960	65.38%	50.87%	36.17%	28.13%
Black or African American alone (NH)	1,397	1,909	2,004	1,782	33.87%	46.53%	55.09%	52.21%
Native American or Alaska Native alone (NH)	3	18	14	5	0.07%	0.44%	0.38%	0.15%
Asian alone (NH)	4	1	6	1	0.10%	0.02%	0.16%	0.03%
Native Hawaiian or Pacific Islander alone (NH)	x	0	1	0	x	0.00%	0.03%	0.00%
Other race alone (NH)	0	1	1	6	0.00%	0.02%	0.03%	0.18%
Mixed race or Multiracial (NH)	x	26	33	92	x	0.63%	0.91%	2.70%
Hispanic or Latino (any race)	24	61	263	567	0.58%	1.49%	7.23%	16.61%
Total	4,125	4,103	3,638	3,413	100.00%	100.00%	100.00%	100.00%

=== 2020 census ===
As of the 2020 census, Holt had a population of 3,413. The median age was 36.2 years. 24.8% of residents were under the age of 18 and 13.2% of residents were 65 years of age or older. For every 100 females there were 93.8 males, and for every 100 females age 18 and over there were 91.2 males age 18 and over.

92.9% of residents lived in urban areas, while 7.1% lived in rural areas.

There were 1,295 households in Holt, of which 35.1% had children under the age of 18 living in them. Of all households, 33.7% were married-couple households, 23.4% were households with a male householder and no spouse or partner present, and 36.3% were households with a female householder and no spouse or partner present. About 26.8% of all households were made up of individuals and 9.6% had someone living alone who was 65 years of age or older.

There were 1,554 housing units, of which 16.7% were vacant. The homeowner vacancy rate was 3.2% and the rental vacancy rate was 11.1%.

=== 2010 census ===
As of the census of 2010, there were 3,638 people, 1,385 households, and 925 families living in the community. The population density was 1,389 inhabitants per square mile (536/km^{2}). There were 1,603 housing units at an average density of 500.9 per square mile (193.4/km^{2}). The racial makeup of the community was 55.2% Black or African American, 39.4% White, 0.4% Native American, 0.2% Asian, 3.2% from other races, and 1.6% from two or more races. 7.2% of the population were Hispanic or Latino of any race.

There were 1,385 households, out of which 26.8% had children under the age of 18 living with them, 33.9% were married couples living together, 25.5% had a female householder with no husband present, and 33.2% were non-families. 28.2% of all households were made up of individuals, and 10.0% had someone living alone who was 65 years of age or older. The average household size was 2.63 and the average family size was 3.18.

In the community, the population was spread out, with 25.2% under the age of 18, 10.5% from 18 to 24, 26.0% from 25 to 44, 26.2% from 45 to 64, and 12.1% who were 65 years of age or older. The median age was 35.6 years. For every 100 females, there were 95.7 males. For every 100 females age 18 and over, there were 100.5 males.

The median income for a household in the community was $28,750, and the median income for a family was $32,731. Males had a median income of $23,517 versus $21,186 for females. The per capita income for the community was $13,964. About 24.7% of families and 31.9% of the population were below the poverty line, including 56.7% of those under age 18 and 19.0% of those age 65 or over.

=== 2000 census ===
As of the census of 2000, there were 4,103 people, 1,785 households, and 1,252 families living in the community. The population density was 1,268.0 inhabitants per square mile (489.6/km^{2}). There were 2,006 housing units at an average density of 567.1 per square mile (219.0/km^{2}). The racial makeup of the community was 51.67% White, 47.04% Black or African American, 0.44% Native American, 0.02% Asian, 0.12% from other races, and 0.71% from two or more races. 1.49% of the population were Hispanic or Latino of any race.

There were 1,614 households, out of which 31.4% had children under the age of 18 living with them, 41.4% were married couples living together, 20.4% had a female householder with no husband present, and 33.0% were non-families. 28.5% of all households were made up of individuals, and 9.3% had someone living alone who was 65 years of age or older. The average household size was 2.54 and the average family size was 3.12.

In the community, the population was spread out, with 27.1% under the age of 18, 10.7% from 18 to 24, 27.5% from 25 to 44, 21.6% from 45 to 64, and 13.1% who were 65 years of age or older. The median age was 35 years. For every 100 females, there were 97.2 males. For every 100 females age 18 and over, there were 94.3 males.

The median income for a household in the community was $26,095, and the median income for a family was $33,165. Males had a median income of $28,212 versus $17,048 for females. The per capita income for the community was $13,116. About 11.3% of families and 20.2% of the population were below the poverty line, including 24.7% of those under age 18 and 23.3% of those age 65 or over.

== Notable people ==
- Johnny Shines, blues guitarist
- Jimmy Walker, American football and basketball coach

== See also ==
- Cottondale, Alabama — adjacent unincorporated community in Tuscaloosa County
- Alberta City, Tuscaloosa — adjacent suburb in Tuscaloosa County
