= Concord, Alabama =

- CDP
- Location in Jefferson County and the state of Alabama
- Coordinates: 33°28′03″N 87°02′21″W
- Country: United States
- State: Alabama
- County: Jefferson

Area
  - Total: 3.38 sq mi (8.76 km^{2})
  - Land: 3.37 sq mi (8.72 km^{2})
  - Water: 0.015 sq mi (0.04 km^{2})
- Elevation: 574 ft (175 m)

Population (2020)
  - Total: 1,690
  - Density: 502.2/sq mi (193.89/km^{2})
- Time zone: UTC-6 (Central (CST))
  - Summer (DST): UTC-5 (CDT)
- ZIP code: 35023
- Area codes: 205, 659
- FIPS code: 01-16936
- GNIS feature ID: 2402792

Concord is a census-designated place in Jefferson County, Alabama, United States. As of the 2020 census, Concord had a population of 1,690. It is northwest from the Birmingham suburb of Hueytown.

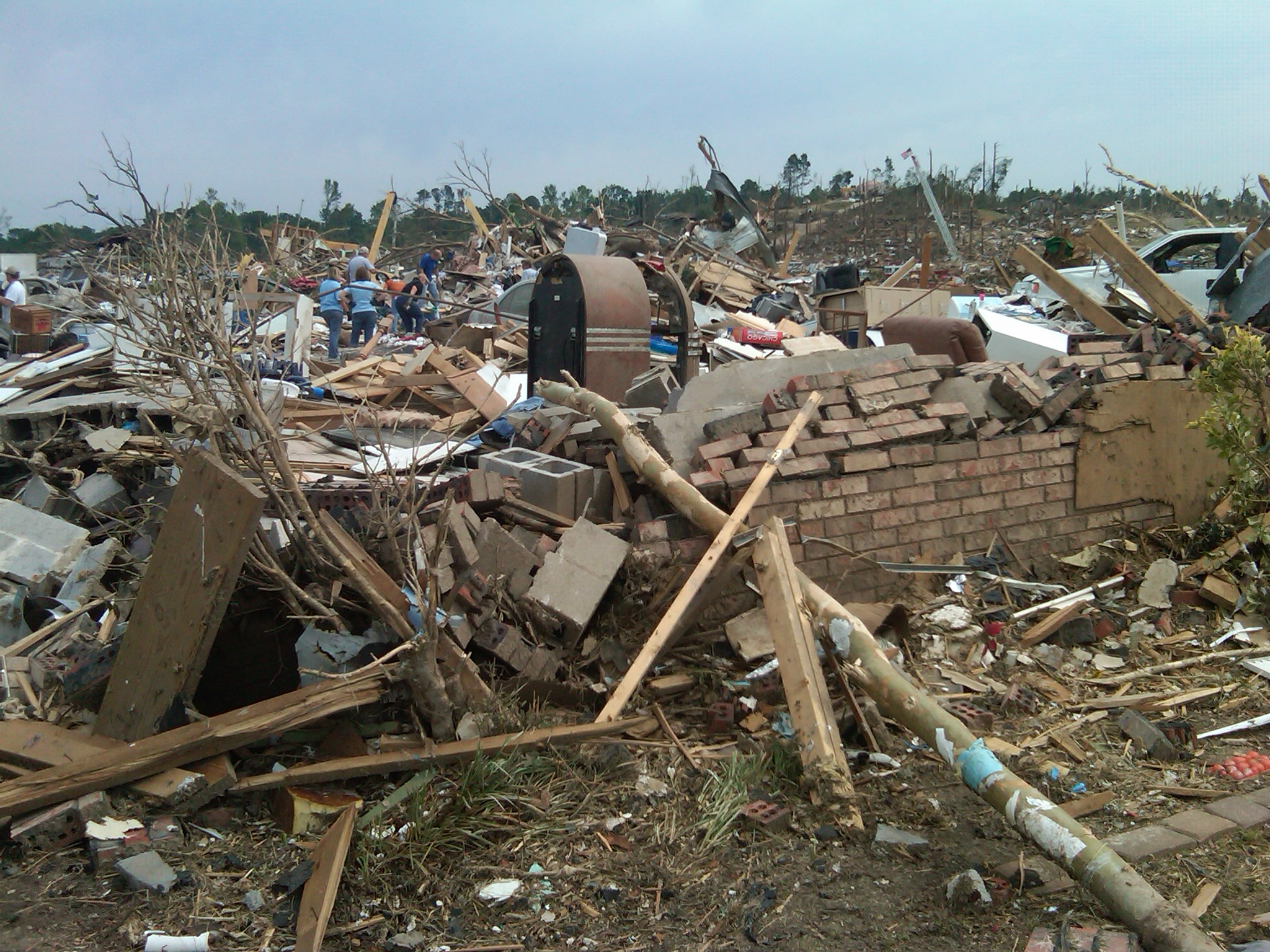
Tuscaloosa tornado damage April 27, 2011

== Geography ==
According to the U.S. Census Bureau, the CDP has a total area of 3.4 square miles (8.8 km^{2}), of which 3.4 square miles (8.8 km^{2}) is land and 0.04 square miles (0.10 km^{2}) (0.59%) is water.

== Demographics ==
Historical population
| Census | Pop. | Note | %± |
|---|---|---|---|
| 2000 | 1,809 | | — |
| 2010 | 1,837 | | 1.5% |
| 2020 | 1,690 | | −8.0% |
U.S. Decennial Census; 1850 1860 1870; 1880 1890-1900; 1910 1920 1930; 1940 1950 1960; 1970 1980 1990; 2000 2010 2020

Concord first appeared as a census designated place in the 2000 U.S. Census.

=== Racial and ethnic composition ===
Concord, Alabama – Racial and ethnic composition Note: the US Census treats Hispanic/Latino as an ethnic category. This table excludes Latinos from the racial categories and assigns them to a separate category. Hispanics/Latinos may be of any race.
| Race / Ethnicity (NH = Non-Hispanic) | Pop 2000 | Pop 2010 | Pop 2020 | % 2000 | % 2010 | % 2020 |
|---|---|---|---|---|---|---|
| White alone (NH) | 1,778 | 1,800 | 1,553 | 98.29% | 97.99% | 91.89% |
| Black or African American alone (NH) | 5 | 10 | 37 | 0.28% | 0.54% | 2.19% |
| Native American or Alaska Native alone (NH) | 10 | 3 | 9 | 0.55% | 0.16% | 0.53% |
| Asian alone (NH) | 4 | 3 | 1 | 0.22% | 0.16% | 0.06% |
| Native Hawaiian or Pacific Islander alone (NH) | 0 | 0 | 1 | 0.00% | 0.00% | 0.06% |
| Other race alone (NH) | 1 | 0 | 6 | 0.06% | 0.00% | 0.36% |
| Mixed race or Multiracial (NH) | 6 | 12 | 70 | 0.33% | 0.65% | 4.14% |
| Hispanic or Latino (any race) | 5 | 9 | 13 | 0.28% | 0.49% | 0.77% |
| Total | 1,809 | 1,837 | 1,690 | 100.00% | 100.00% | 100.00% |

=== 2020 census ===
As of the 2020 census, Concord had a population of 1,690. The median age was 42.4 years. 20.8% of residents were under the age of 18 and 21.2% were 65 years of age or older. For every 100 females, there were 103.9 males, and for every 100 females age 18 and over, there were 106.2 males age 18 and over.

81.1% of residents lived in urban areas, while 18.9% lived in rural areas.

There were 697 households in Concord, of which 27.5% had children under the age of 18 living in them. Of all households, 52.9% were married-couple households, 17.9% were households with a male householder and no spouse or partner present, and 22.2% were households with a female householder and no spouse or partner present. About 27.2% of all households were made up of individuals and 13.9% had someone living alone who was 65 years of age or older.

There were 752 housing units, of which 7.3% were vacant. The homeowner vacancy rate was 1.1% and the rental vacancy rate was 1.0%.

=== 2010 census ===
As of the census of 2010, there were 1,837 people, 817 households, and 573 families residing in the CDP. The population density was 536.6 inhabitants per square mile (207.2/km^{2}). There were 791 housing units at an average density of 232.6 per square mile (89.8/km^{2}). The racial makeup of the CDP was 98.34% White, 0.28% Black or African American, 0.55% Native American, 0.22% Asian, 0.28% from other races, and 0.33% from two or more races. 0.28% of the population were Hispanic or Latino of any race.

There were 754 households, out of which 27.8% had children under the age of 18 living with them, 66.5% were married couples living together, 7.6% had a female householder with no husband present, and 24.0% were non-families. 22.6% of all households were made up of individuals, and 12.1% had someone living alone who was 65 years of age or older. The average household size was 2.40 and the average family size was 2.81.

In the CDP, the population was spread out, with 19.8% under the age of 18, 7.5% from 18 to 24, 27.4% from 25 to 44, 27.2% from 45 to 64, and 18.1% who were 65 years of age or older. The median age was 42 years. For every 100 females, there were 91.0 males. For every 100 females age 18 and over, there were 88.3 males.

The median income for a household in the CDP was $63,150, and the median income for a family was $55,129. Males had a median income of $35,825 versus $26,406 for females. The per capita income for the CDP was $24,490. About 1.5% of families and 2.4% of the population were below the poverty line, including none of those under age 18 and 8.0% of those age 65 or over.
