= John Oldshue =

American meteorologist

John Oldshue is a former American meteorologist and storm chaser for ABC 33/40 in Birmingham, Alabama, from 1997 to 2011, before he retired to run a small business. He won an Emmy award for coverage of the Tuscaloosa tornado on December 16, 2000, alongside meteorologist James Spann. A decade later, he was the first storm spotter/meteorologist to capture video of the April 27, 2011, Tuscaloosa tornado and transmit that to ABC 33/40, approximately 30 minutes before the tornado struck the city. Spann later called Oldshue one of the “unsung heroes of April 27,” later saying, “He captured that big wedge tornado on the ground when it was still 30 miles south of Tuscaloosa. That dramatic video convinced a lot of people to take cover."

== Personal life ==
He was born and raised in Tuscaloosa, Alabama. His mother, Isabel Oldshue, is a retired family practice doctor. His father, Jerry Oldshue Sr., was the historian of the University of Alabama and died in November 2015.

In June 2011, he relocated from Tuscaloosa to Fairhope.

== Education ==
He graduated from Mississippi State University in 1993, with a BS in Geosciences majoring in meteorology. He completed his MBA degree at the University of Alabama in 1998.

== Career ==
Oldshue worked at WDBB in Tuscaloosa as the Chief Meteorologist from 1993 to 1995 and at WALA in Mobile as the morning meteorologist from 1995 until January 1997. He joined ABC 33/40 as weekend meteorologist and storm chaser from January 1997 until January 2011. He won an Emmy Award with James Spann from the National Academy of Television Arts and Sciences for live coverage of a deadly tornado in Tuscaloosa on December 16, 2000. (A camera mounted on the transmitter tower of the former Channel 33 captured live images of the tornado as it moved through the community.) The station won an Edward R. Murrow Award for this coverage.

John is a Certified Broadcast Meteorologist by the American Meteorological Society and has the National Weather Association Seal of Approval. He was voted best small market weather anchor in Alabama for 1994 and 1995 by the Associated Press.

In 2011, he retired from working as a meteorologist in pursuit of several online businesses including LowCards.com, SaveOnPhone.com, and SaveOnInsurance.com. In 2012 John Oldshue and James Spann sold their weather forecasting business, "The Weather Company" to IBM and The Weather Channel for an undisclosed sum.

He later became a fill-in meteorologist for WKRG in Mobile and is currently a fill-in meteorologist at ABC 33/40 in Birmingham. In 2016 he became one of the first FAA approved aerial drone pilots and created SoutheastSky.com for aerial imaging and videography. He has been part of teams winning two Addy awards for his aerial videography work on Alabama tourism commercials.
