= Cottondale, Alabama =

Suburb in Alabama, United States

- Census-designated place
- Location of Cottondale in Tuscaloosa County, Alabama.
- Coordinates: 33°11′32″N 87°27′15″W
- Country: United States
- State: Alabama
- County: Tuscaloosa

Area
  - Total: 3.46 sq mi (8.97 km^{2})
  - Land: 3.44 sq mi (8.92 km^{2})
  - Water: 0.019 sq mi (0.05 km^{2})
- Elevation: 344 ft (105 m)

Population (2020)
  - Total: 3,130
  - Density: 908.9/sq mi (350.94/km^{2})
- Time zone: UTC-6 (Central (CST))
  - Summer (DST): UTC-5 (CDT)
- ZIP code: 35453
- Area codes: 205, 659
- GNIS feature ID: 2727439

Cottondale is a census-designated place in Tuscaloosa County, Alabama, United States, now encompassed in the eastern suburbs of Tuscaloosa. As of the 2020 census, Cottondale had a population of 3,130. The ZIP Code is 35453. Alternative spellings include Cotton Dale, Kennedale, Kennidale and Konnidale.

== History ==
Cottondale was the site of cotton mills where the Knights of Labor had some success in organizing drives in the late 1880s; and where "Mother" Jones worked in 1904 while studying conditions for working women and children in the South.

Little girls and boys, barefooted, walked up and down between the endless rows of spindles, reaching thin little hands into the machinery to repair snapped threads.... Tiny babies of six years old with faces of sixty did an eight-hour shift for ten cents a day.... The machines, built in the north, were built low for the hands of little children.

Cottondale was originally called Kennedale in honor of Joseph Kennedy, one of the owners of a local cotton mill. In 1876, the name was changed to Cottondale for the cotton mill.

== Demographics ==
Cottondale first appeared as a CDP in the 2020 census.

Historical population
Census	Pop.	Note	%±
2020	3,130		—
U.S. Decennial Census

=== 2020 census ===
As of the 2020 census, Cottondale had a population of 3,130. The median age was 37.5 years. About 22.7% of residents were under age 18, and 15.4% were age 65 or older. For every 100 females, there were 91.3 males; among residents age 18 and over, there were 93.0 males for every 100 females.

All residents lived in urban areas (100.0%), while 0.0% lived in rural areas.

There were 1,333 households, including 28.4% with children under age 18. Married-couple households made up 34.7% of households, while 22.2% had a male householder with no spouse or partner present and 35.3% had a female householder with no spouse or partner present. Individuals living alone made up 32.6% of households, and 8.6% of households had someone living alone age 65 or older.

There were 1,480 housing units, of which 9.9% were vacant. The homeowner vacancy rate was 1.6%, and the rental vacancy rate was 9.9%.

Cottondale CDP, Alabama – Racial and ethnic composition Note: the US Census treats Hispanic/Latino as an ethnic category. This table excludes Latinos from the racial categories and assigns them to a separate category. Hispanics/Latinos may be of any race.
Race / Ethnicity (NH = Non-Hispanic)	Pop 2020	% 2020
White alone (NH)	1,609	51.41%
Black or African American alone (NH)	1,049	33.51%
Native American or Alaska Native alone (NH)	9	0.29%
Asian alone (NH)	15	0.48%
Native Hawaiian or Pacific Islander alone (NH)	2	0.06%
Other race alone (NH)	8	0.26%
Mixed race or Multiracial (NH)	122	3.90%
Hispanic or Latino (any race)	316	10.10%
Total	3,130	100.00%

== See also ==
- Holt, Alabama — an adjacent unincorporated community in Tuscaloosa County
- Alberta City, Tuscaloosa — an adjacent suburb of Tuscaloosa City
