= WERC-FM =

Radio station in Hoover, Alabama

- Hoover, Alabama; United States
- Broadcast area: Greater Birmingham
- Frequency: 105.5 MHz (HD Radio)
- Branding: News Radio 105.5 WERC

Programming
- Format: Talk radio
- Subchannels: HD2: Urban Gospel; HD3: Urban AC
- Affiliations: Fox News Radio; Compass Media Networks; Premiere Networks; WBRC

Ownership
- Owner: iHeartMedia, Inc.; (iHM Licenses, LLC)
- Sister stations: WDXB, WERC, WMJJ, WQEN

History
- First air date: September 1993
- Former call signs: WWIV (1992–1993); WWBR (1993–1996); WRAX (1996–1997); WENN (1997–2008); WVVB (2008–2009)
- Former frequencies: 105.9 MHz (1993–2005)
- Call sign meaning: Derived from WERC (AM)

Technical information
- Licensing authority: FCC
- Facility ID: 62278
- Class: C2
- ERP: 29,500 watts
- HAAT: 190 meters (620 ft)
- Transmitter coordinates: 33°29′4.4″N 86°48′25.0″W
- Translators: HD2: 105.1 W286BK (Birmingham); HD3: 106.5 W293CM (Graysville)
- Repeater: 960 WERC (Birmingham)

Links
- Public license information: Public file; LMS
- Webcast: Listen live (via iHeartRadio); HD2: Listen live (via iHeartRadio); HD3: Listen live (via iHeartRadio) (HD3)
- Website: wercfm.iheart.com

WERC-FM (105.5 FM) is a commercial radio station licensed to Hoover, Alabama, United States, and serving Greater Birmingham. It is owned by iHeartMedia and simulcasts a talk format with WERC 960 AM. The station's studios and offices are on First Avenue South in Birmingham, off Interstate 65.

WERC-FM's transmitter is sited atop Red Mountain, off Valley Avenue in Birmingham. WERC-FM broadcasts using HD Radio technology. Its digital subchannels carry urban gospel and urban adult contemporary formats, which in turn feed two FM translators.

== History ==
Today's WERC-FM is the successor of two Birmingham-area FM stations, WWIV and WENN-FM.

=== WWIV ===
WERC-FM debuted in September 1993. The call sign was WWIV, and it broadcast on 105.9 MHz with 1,400 watts, a fraction of its current power. The original city of license was Trussville. For a brief time, WWIV served as a simulcast of then-co-owned WYDE (850 AM, now WXJC), which at the time was a news-talk station. That October, WWIV changed its call sign to WWBR and became album rock station "105.9 the Bear". Though the station filled a niche in the market, signal limitations and a less than desirable tower location prevented it from making a significant dent in the local ratings.

On January 22, 1996, the music focus was shifted to modern rock and alternative music. The station changed its on-air name to 106X and took on the new call sign WRAX. The station remained with this format until it swapped frequencies with WENN in December 1997.

=== WENN-FM ===
WENN-FM signed on the air at 107.7 FM on September 6, 1969. It was the sister station of WAGG 1320 AM (now WENN). WENN-FM originally simulcast the AM's urban contemporary format, primarily playing R&B, soul, and on Sundays, urban gospel. By the end of the 1970s, 1320 AM had broken away from the simulcast, airing an urban gospel sound while the FM station stuck with urban contemporary.

Both WENN-FM and AM were purchased in 1976 by Dr. A.G. Gaston, one of the leaders of the black business community in Birmingham. Throughout its time as an urban station, WENN-FM created local ties to the community through on-air personalities such as Tall Paul, Shelly Stewart, Jimmy Lawson, Stan Granger, Michael Starr, Roe Bonner, Chris Talley, Dave Donnell and James Gavin. The station used the slogan "WENN's gonna make me a WENNER!" It shot to number 1 in the Arbitron ratings and became one of the most popular stations of any format in Birmingham.

By the late 1980s, WENN-FM began to shift from an R&B/soul-based sound to a more Mainstream Urban playlist, with the introduction of hip-hop and rap music. The slower R&B and soul songs were moved to the Quiet Storm program at night. It also adopted the slogan 107.7 WENN, The People's Station. WENN-FM maintained a strong position in the Birmingham radio market, usually in Arbitron's top five stations.

=== Changes in ownership ===
In 1997, Gaston, died at age 101. His heirs wanted to sell their media properties. At about the same time, WENN-FM faced direct competition on FM for the first time, as both WBHJ (95.7 FM) and WBHK (98.7 FM) adopted formats that challenged WENN-FM for urban listeners. The ratings for WENN-FM faltered.

In the wake of the passing of the Telecommunications Act of 1996, WENN-FM, and its AM sister station 610 WAGG, were sold to Cox Radio, owner of WBHJ and WBHK. A few weeks later, the FM station was sold again, this time to Dick Broadcasting, which already owned and operated five other stations in Birmingham: WYSF (94.5 FM), WZRR (99.5 FM), WRAX (105.9 FM), WJOX (690 AM), and WAPI (1070 AM).

The purchase of WENN-FM by an out-of-town based company, as well as the sudden and steep decline in the station's ratings, prompted management to make a change. In December 1997, Dick Broadcasting swapped the broadcast frequencies of WENN and WRAX. Management believed owning the only alternative rock station in the market would be more profitable on the stronger signal, rather than what had become the third choice for listeners of urban music. The switch occurred, and WENN became known as "Rhythm 105.9". However, the 105.9 signal had lower power and a shorter tower location on the eastern side of Birmingham. By the end of 1998, the legendary WENN-FM, though still profitable, briefly went off the air. Dick Broadcasting, which had no experience with urban formats, decided to sell WENN-FM, fearing it would bring down the value of its cluster.

=== Clear Channel Communications ===
In 1999, WENN-FM was purchased by Clear Channel Communications (the forerunner to today's iHeartMedia). WENN-FM came back on the air as an urban oldies station with the nickname "Jammin' Oldies 105.9". Meanwhile, Alternative Rock station WRAX, known as "107.7 the X", became a rating success after it moved to WENN's former signal. (Citadel Broadcasting, which purchased the former Dick Broadcasting properties in Birmingham, returned urban adult contemporary music to the 107.7 frequency in 2005 with the launch of WUHT.)

In January 2000, "Jammin' Oldies" came to an end. WENN-FM switched to an urban adult contemporary format with a new name, "V-105.9" (even though there was no "V" in the call letters). The station subsequently tweaked the format, adding more new rap and hip hop in an attempt to make it competitive with 95.7 Jamz, but met with limited success. In September 2002, it again changed its name, this time to "Power 105.9", focusing even more on hip hop, rap and youthful R&B. None of these formats worked, so it switched to urban gospel as "Hallelujah 105.9 FM" on February 1, 2003. It copied an urban gospel station that Clear Channel had introduced in Memphis the previous year, WHAL-FM. This format proved more successful, consistently ranking among the top 10 stations in Birmingham's Arbitron ratings.

To increase the station's broadcast power and improve its coverage area, on February 1, 2005, WENN moved from 105.9 to 105.5. It changed the station's city of license from Trussville to Hoover. It began calling itself "105.5 Hallelujah FM", swapping dial positions with WRTR in Tuscaloosa.

=== Alternative rock and talk ===
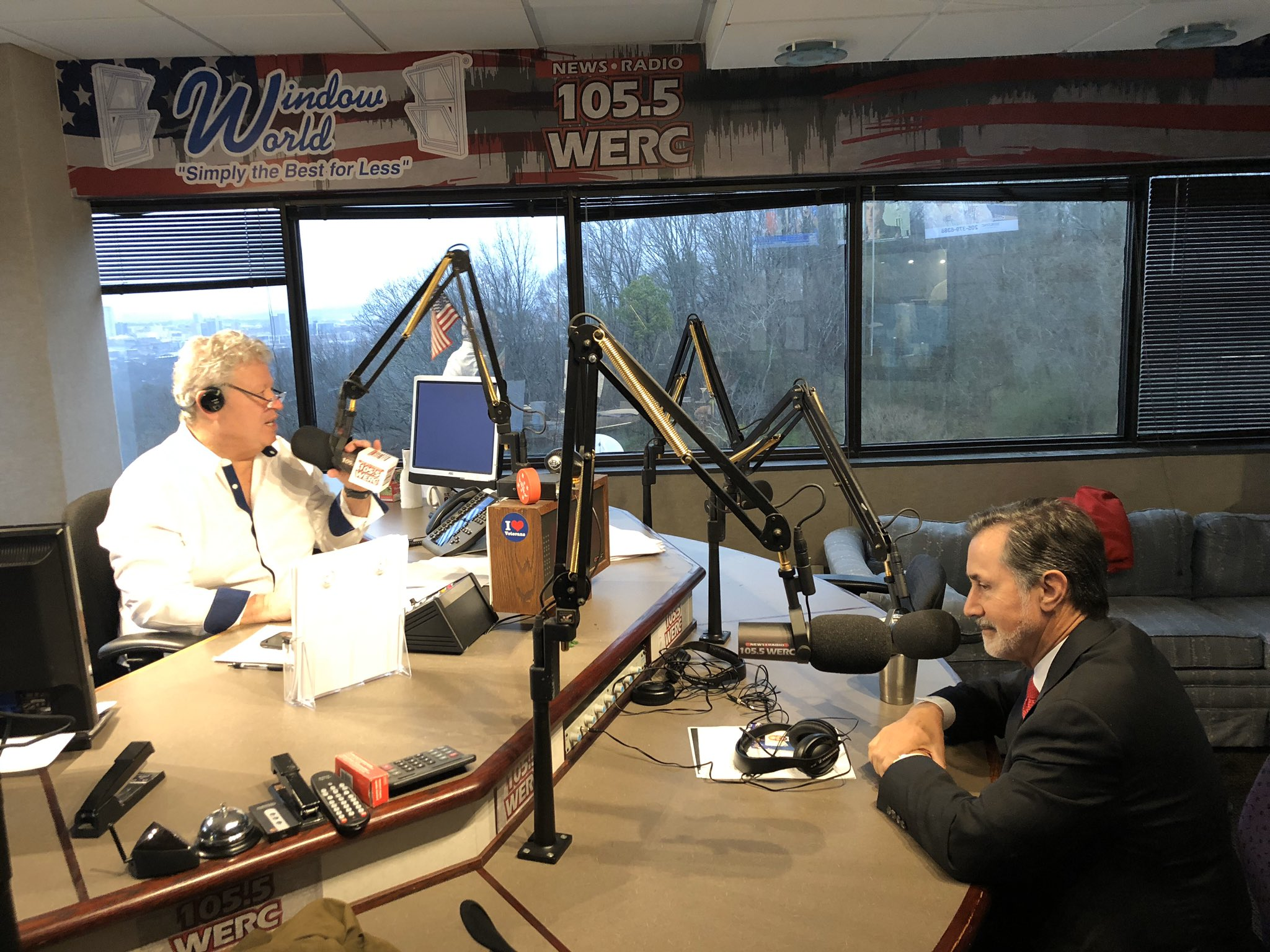
Politician Gary Palmer in-studio at WERC-FM in 2020.

On December 2, 2006, Clear Channel surprised Birmingham radio listeners by ending urban gospel music on WENN-FM. The new format was alternative rock. This came less than one week after WRAX, by then at 100.5 FM, dropped modern rock to become the market's first FM sports radio station. The WENN-FM call letters were retired on September 18, 2008. The new call sign was WVVB, as "105.5 The Vulcan", a tribute to a well-known landmark in Birmingham: The Vulcan Statue.

WVVB changed formats on July 6, 2009, to become a simulcast of the news-talk format of WERC, then at 960 AM. This was the second incarnation of WERC-FM in Birmingham. From 1972 until 1977, the WERC-FM call letters were assigned to 106.9 FM. The simulcast with 960 AM ended in January 2011, when that frequency changed formats and became an active rock station. It revived the "Vulcan" branding and, on February 15, the WVVB call letters. At that point, the talk format aired solely on WERC-FM. On June 23, 2011, WERC-FM resumed simulcasting on 960 AM. The AM station resumed the WERC call sign on July 14, 2011.

== Programming ==
Weekdays begin with a local news and interview show, Alabama's Morning News with JT and Leah. The rest of the weekday schedule is nationally syndicated shows, largely from co-owned Premiere Networks.

== HD Radio subchannels ==
WERC-FM-HD2 went on the air in June 2011 with an urban gospel format, branded as "Hallelujah 105.1". It feeds FM translator W286BK at 105.1 MHz.

WERC-FM-HD3 went on the air in December 2013 with K-LOVE, the contemporary Christian format from the Educational Media Foundation (EMF). It feeds FM translator W241AI at 96.1 MHz. In 2015, WERC-FM-HD3 and WMJJ-HD3 swapped formats. WMJJ-HD3 started carrying K-LOVE, while WERC-FM-HD3 began playing Urban AC music, using the "B106.5" moniker. It now feeds FM translator W293CM at 106.5 MHz.
