= WJOX =

WJOX may refer to:

- WJOX (AM), a radio station (690 AM) in Birmingham, Alabama, United States
- WJOX-FM, a radio station (94.5 FM) in Birmingham, Alabama, United States
- WJQX, a radio station (100.5 FM) in Helena, Alabama, United States known as WJOX from 2006 to 2008
- WJXQ, a radio station (106.1 FM) licensed to Charlotte, Michigan known as WJOX from 1976 to March 1981
