= Birmingham Barons =

- Founded in 1885; Birmingham, Alabama
Team logo
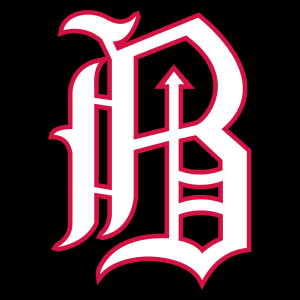
Cap insignia

Minor league affiliations
- Class: Double-A (1946–1961; 1964–1965; 1967–1975; 1981–present)
- Previous classes: Class-A1 (1936–1945); Class-A (1902–1935); Class-B (1892–1901)
- League: Southern League (1964–1965; 1967–1970; 1972–1975; 1981–present)
- Division: North Division
- Previous leagues: Dixie Association (1971); Southern Association (1901–1961); Southern League (1885; 1887–1889; 1892–1893; 1896; 1898)

Major league affiliations
- Team: Chicago White Sox (1986–present)
- Previous teams: Detroit Tigers (1957–1961; 1981–1985); Kansas City/Oakland Athletics (1964–1975); New York Yankees (1953–1956); Boston Red Sox (1948–1952); Philadelphia Athletics (1947); Pittsburgh Pirates (1946); Cincinnati Reds (1939–1945); Chicago Cubs (1936–1938)

Minor league titles
- Dixie Series titles (6): 1929; 1931; 1948; 1951; 1958; 1967
- League titles (14): 1928; 1936; 1948; 1951; 1958; 1967; 1983; 1987; 1989; 1993; 2002; 2013; 2024; 2025
- Pennants (10): 1888; 1892; 1906; 1912; 1914; 1928; 1929; 1931; 1958; 1959
- Division titles (10): 1983; 1987; 1989; 1991; 1993; 2002; 2013; 2021; 2024; 2025
- First-half titles (11): 1983; 1987; 1989; 1991; 2000; 2002; 2008; 2009; 2011; 2013; 2024
- Second-half titles (7): 1990; 1993; 2001; 2003; 2004; 2005; 2025

Team data
- Name: Birmingham Barons (1901–1961; 1964–1965; 1981–present)
- Previous names: Birmingham A's (1967–1975); Birmingham Reds (1898); Birmingham Bluebirds (1896); Birmingham Blues (1893); Birmingham Grays (1892–1893); Birmingham (1889); Birmingham Maroons (1888); Birmingham Ironmakers (1887); Birmingham Coal Barons (1885)
- Colors: Black, red, gray
- Mascot: Babe Ruff (1992-present); Lillie Mays (2006-present); WickyWood (1981-1992)
- Ballpark: Regions Field (2013–present); Rickwood Field (1910–1961, 1964–1965, 1967-1975, 1981–1987, 1996–present)
- Previous parks: West End Park (aka "The Slag Pile") (1885–1910); Hoover Metropolitan Stadium (1988–2012)
- Owner/ Operator: Diamond Baseball Holdings
- General manager: John Cook
- Manager: Pat Leyland
- Website: milb.com/birmingham

The Birmingham Barons are a Minor League Baseball team based in Birmingham, Alabama. The team, which plays in the Southern League, is the Double-A affiliate of the Chicago White Sox and plays at Regions Field in downtown Birmingham. The Barons were previously located in Montgomery, Alabama, and known as the Montgomery Rebels.

== History ==
Most of the professional baseball teams that have played in Birmingham have used the name Barons. The current team began playing in Birmingham in 1981, having previously played in Montgomery, Alabama as the Montgomery Rebels. Like previous Barons teams, they played at Rickwood Field on a full-time basis from 1981 to 1987. Since then, they have only played at Rickwood on special occasions. From 1988 to 2012, the team played at Hoover Metropolitan Stadium in the suburb of Hoover, Alabama, where former basketball star Michael Jordan played with the team in 1994. Since 2013, the team has played at Regions Field in the downtown part of Birmingham.

As a result of Major League Baseball's restructuring of Minor League Baseball in 2021, the Barons were organized into the eight-team Double-A South. In 2022, the Double-A South became known as the Southern League, the name historically used by the regional circuit prior to the 2021 reorganization.

Elmore Sports Group purchased the team in 1995. In 2005, Elmore Sports Group sold to team to Don Logan. In 2023, Diamond Baseball Holdings purchased the team from The Logan Family.

== Playoffs and championships ==
- Southern League playoff appearances (18): 1983, 1987, 1989, 1990, 1991, 1993, 2000, 2001, 2002, 2003, 2004, 2005, 2008, 2009, 2011, 2013, 2024, 2025
- Southern League championships (8): 1983, 1987, 1989, 1993, 2002, 2013, 2024, 2025
- Dixie Series championships (6): 1929, 1931, 1948, 1951, 1958, 1967

== Television and radio ==
All Birmingham Barons games are televised live on MiLB.TV. All games are also broadcast on radio on either WJQX 100.5 FM, WJOX-FM 94.5 FM or WJOX-AM 690 AM. Birmingham Barons Hall-of-Fame broadcaster Curt Bloom is the broadcast commentator for both WERC and MiLB.TV and has been the voice of the Barons since 1992.

== Roster ==
Birmingham Barons roster
Players	Coaches/Other
Pitchers: 34 Nick Altermatt; 12 Morris Austin; 25 Luke Bell; 39 Jonathan Clark; 28 Dylan Cumming; 32 Gabe Davis; 5 Phil Fox; 13 Lucas Gordon; 22 Jacob Heatherly; 33 Carson Jacobs; 17 Jackson Kelley; 35 Jared Kelley ~; 38 Aric McAtee; 15 Connor McCullough; 31 Mark McLaughlin; 30 Jake Palisch *; 36 Jarold Rosado; -- Tommy Vail; Catchers: 21 Jorge Corona; 20 Calvin Harris; Infielders: 29 Anthony DePino; 6 Brendan Dixon; 14 Drake Logan; 26 Alec Makarewicz; 4 Jeral Pérez; 1 Colby Shelton; 18 Jordan Sprinkle; Outfielders: 23 Jacob Burke; 27 Adam Fogel; 7 Wilfred Veras; 2 Samuel Zavala	Manager: 11 Pat Leyland; Coaches: 24 Aaron Hill (hitting); 16 John Kovalik (pitching); -- Juan Maldonado (performance); 3 Daniel Millwee (bench); 60-day injured list: -- Mason Adams; 7-day injured list; * On Chicago White Sox 40-man roster; ~ Development list; # Rehab assignment; ∞ Reserve list; ‡ Restricted list; § Suspended list; † Temporarily inactive list; Roster updated June 2, 2026; Transactions; → More rosters: MiLB • Southern League; → Chicago White Sox minor league players

== Notable Barons/A's ==
- Jeff Abbott
- Tim Anderson
- Wilson Álvarez
- Dylan Axelrod
- Wally Backman (manager)
- Sal Bando
- Jason Bere
- Eddie Brinkman (manager)
- Vida Blue
- Britt Burns (pitching coach)
- Mark Buehrle
- Mike Cameron
- Bert Campaneris
- Phil Cavarretta (manager)
- Ron Coomer
- Joe Crede
- Rob Dibble
- Dave Duncan
- Ray Durham
- Darrell Evans
- Scott Eyre
- Rollie Fingers
- Terry Francona (manager)
- Jon Garland
- Brad Goldberg
- Burleigh Grimes
- Sam Hairston (bench coach) (Patriarch of the 3-generation Hairston MLB family)
- Mike Heath (manager)
- Roberto Hernández
- Bo Jackson
- Reggie Jackson
- Bobby Jenks
- Howard Johnson
- Michael Jordan
- Paul Konerko
- Marcel Lachemann
- Rene Lachemann
- Tony La Russa
- Carlos Lee
- Paul Lindblad
- Rube Marquard
- Jack McDowell
- John McNamara (manager)
- Bob Melvin
- Jim Nash
- Blue Moon Odom
- Miguel Olivo
- Magglio Ordóñez
- Jake Peavy
- Rico Petrocelli (manager)
- Jimmy Piersall
- Aaron Poreda
- Johnny Riddle (player/manager)
- Luis Robert
- Aaron Rowand
- Joe Rudi
- Marcus Semien
- Razor Shines (manager)
- Bill Stafford
- Wally Taylor
- Gene Tenace
- Bobby Thigpen
- Frank Thomas
- Pie Traynor
- Robin Ventura
- Omar Vizquel (manager)
- Phil Weintraub
- Bob Wickman

== See also ==
- Birmingham Black Barons

Preceded by New Orleans Pelicans	Boston Red Sox; Double-A affiliate 1948–1952	Succeeded by Oklahoma City Indians (1956)
