= WZRR =

Coordinates: 33.463°N 86.850°W

- Birmingham, Alabama; United States
- Broadcast area: Birmingham metropolitan area
- Frequency: 99.5 MHz
- Branding: Talk 99.5

Programming
- Format: Talk radio
- Affiliations: ABC News Radio; Westwood One; Auburn Sports Network

Ownership
- Owner: Cumulus Media; (Radio License Holding CBC, LLC)
- Sister stations: WAPI; WJOX; WJOX-FM; WJQX; WUHT

History
- First air date: December 1976
- Former call signs: WVOK-FM (1976–1978); WRKK (1978–1984); WQUS (1984–1985); WLTB (1985–1988)
- Call sign meaning: Former rock and roll format

Technical information
- Licensing authority: FCC
- Facility ID: 16899
- Class: C0
- ERP: 100,000 watts
- HAAT: 309 meters (1,014 ft)

Links
- Public license information: Public file; LMS
- Webcast: Listen live
- Website: www.talk995.com

WZRR (99.5 FM, "Talk 99.5") is a commercial radio station licensed to Birmingham, Alabama, carrying a talk format. WZRR is one of several Birmingham-area radio stations owned by Cumulus Media, with studios and offices on Goodwin Crest Drive in Homewood.

WZRR carries local talk shows during the day, but at night it runs nationally syndicated programs from co-owned Westwood One including The Mark Levin Show, America at Night with Rich Valdés and Red Eye Radio. Most hours begin an update from ABC News Radio. It is also Central Alabama's radio home of Auburn Tigers athletics.

WZRR's transmitter is west of Red Mountain, off Spaulding Ishkooda Road in Birmingham. It has an effective radiated power (ERP) of 100,000 watts, the maximum for most American FM stations. Its tower is more than 1,000 feet (300 meters) in height above average terrain (HAAT). It broadcasts using HD Radio technology.

== History ==
=== Rock Station K-99 ===
In December 1976, the station first signed on the air. Its call sign was WVOK-FM, the sister station to WVOK (690 AM). "K-99", as the station was called, was Birmingham's first full-time progressive rock station. Previously, WJLN-FM and WERC-FM dabbled in that format on a part-time basis.

K-99 played an eclectic mix of rock songs from artists of the 1960s and 1970s, and was a ratings success. When WVOK AM was sold to Mack Sanders in 1978, the call letters of the FM station were changed to WRKK, representing the word "Rock", but the "K-99" handle was retained. In 1981, WAPI-FM changed its format from easy listening to album rock, thus giving Birmingham two stations in the same format. This continued until the next year.

=== Country and soft AC ===
In 1982, the new owners of WRKK changed the station's format to country music, and the station's branding was modified to "K-99 Country". Competing against market leader WZZK-FM, the new WRKK was not successful.

In an attempt to change K-99's fortunes, in 1984, the call letters were changed to WQUS, and the on-air name of the station was changed to "U.S. 99". Neither the new name nor the hiring of the popular Birmingham morning drive team of Tommy Charles and John Ed Willoughby improved the fortunes of the station.

In 1985, U.S. 99 dropped country music and flipped to soft adult contemporary, changed its call letters to WLTB, and rebranded as "Lite 99".

=== Classic rock ===
At 6:00 p.m. on Christmas Day 1988, the 99.5 frequency became the new home of classic rock in Birmingham, with the new call letters of WZRR and the new on-air name "Rock 99". The first song was "All Right Now" by Free. The station remained with the classic rock format for just over 23 years. In 1995, the station began calling itself "Classic Rock 99.5". In 2002 and 2003, it was known as "99.5 the Buzzard". In 2003, the name was changed again, this time to "Rock 99.5", using basically the same logo as it did in the late 1980s. In 2010, the name was once again shortened to "Rock 99" and the slogan heard most often on the station was "Alabama's Best Rock".

In April 2010, the station added the locally originated "Mojo Morning Show". The rest of the on-air line-up included Lori Ray, Blazeman and Jason Mack. WZRR had been owned by Citadel Broadcasting. Citadel merged with Cumulus Media on September 16, 2011.

=== Switch to Top 40 ===
On New Year's Day 2012, at Midnight, Cumulus fired the local on-air staff and flipped WZRR's long-running rock format to Top 40/CHR, branded as "99.5 The Vibe". The final song played on "Rock 99" was "Girls, Girls, Girls" by Mötley Crüe, while the first song played as "The Vibe" was "Party Rock Anthem" by LMFAO. Cumulus already had two similarly formatted and branded stations in addition to WZRR: in Kansas City on KCHZ ("95.7 The Vibe"), and in Toledo, Ohio on W264AK ("100.7 The Vibe"), which has since changed format. The "i" letter in the station's branding is similar to those of Cumulus' "i"-branded stations such as KLIF-FM ("i93") in Dallas/Fort Worth.

=== Nash Icon ===
On August 15, 2014, at Midnight, after playing Bang Bang by Jessie J, WZRR dropped its CHR format. It began stunting with the songs "Sweet Home Alabama" by Lynyrd Skynyrd and "All Summer Long" by Kid Rock on a loop, while running liners advising listeners to tune in at 3 p.m. that day. At that time, WZRR flipped to 1990s and 2000s country music, being one of the first stations to adopt Cumulus' new "Nash Icon" branding as 99.5 Nash Icon. The first song on "Nash Icon" was "Gone Country" by Alan Jackson.

=== Talk radio ===
On May 20, 2016, at 5 p.m., WZRR flipped to a hybrid Southern rock/country format, branded as "99.5 The South". The first song on "The South" was "Southbound" by the Allman Brothers. The playlist included strictly artists from the Southern United States, with a focus on classic rock/adult alternative artists. However, "The South" was revealed to be merely a stunt, as just four days later, WZRR began simulcasting the talk radio format of co-owned WAPI (1070 AM). WZRR immediately became the main station, under the moniker "Talk 99.5", with WAPI's existence only acknowledged during legally mandated station identifications.

WZRR and WAPI joined a crowded talk field in the Birmingham radio market that already included WYDE AM-FM and WERC AM-FM. (WYDE-AM-FM have since switched to a Southern Gospel and Christian talk and teaching format.)

Along with the simulcast came a revamped lineup. Weekdays begin with Richard Dixon & Valerie Vining "Dixon & Vining". "News & Views" with Dale Jackson and Andrew McLain "The Line" are heard in middays. "Leland Live" starring Leland Whaley airs in afternoon drive time. Syndicated programs at night include The Mark Levin Show, America at Night with Rich Valdes and Red Eye Radio rounding out the weekday lineup.

On March 10, 2025, WAPI went silent. It was one of six Cumulus stations to shut down on the weekend of March 7, as part of a larger silencing of underperforming Cumulus stations. WZRR was not affected and retained the talk format.

== See also ==
- List of radio stations in Alabama
