= WJQX =

Coordinates: 33.095°N 87.254°W

- Helena, Alabama; United States
- Broadcast area: Greater Birmingham; Central Alabama
- Frequency: 100.5 MHz
- Branding: Jox Tuscaloosa

Programming
- Format: Sports
- Affiliations: ESPN Radio; Auburn Tigers

Ownership
- Owner: Cumulus Media; (Radio License Holding CBC, LLC)
- Sister stations: WAPI; WJOX; WJOX-FM; WUHT; WZRR

History
- First air date: 1991
- Former call signs: WLXY (1991–2003); WANZ (2003–2005); WRAX (2005–2006); WJOX (2006–2008); WWMM (2008–2010); WAPI-FM (2010–2013)
- Former frequencies: 100.7 MHz (1991–1993)
- Call sign meaning: sister station to WJOX-FM

Technical information
- Licensing authority: FCC
- Facility ID: 70914
- Class: C1
- ERP: 69,000 watts
- HAAT: 309 meters (1,014 ft)

Links
- Public license information: Public file; LMS
- Webcast: Listen live; Listen live (via iHeartRadio)
- Website: www.joxtuscaloosa.com

WJQX (100.5 FM, "Jox Tuscaloosa") is a commercial radio station licensed to Helena, Alabama, and serving Greater Birmingham and Central Alabama. It is one of several sports radio stations owned by Cumulus Media in the Birmingham area, along with WJOX (690 AM) and WJOX-FM 94.5. Most of WJQX's schedule is from ESPN Radio and it also carries Auburn Tigers sports. The studios are on Goodwin Crest Drive in Homewood.

WJQX is a Class C1 FM station. It has an effective radiated power (ERP) of 69,000 watts. The transmitter is off Cedar Crest Road in Vance, Alabama.

== History ==
=== Early years ===
The station first signed on at 100.7 FM in 1991 as WLXY. WLXY was originally licensed to Northport, served only the Tuscaloosa area and was known on the air as "Arrow 100.7", playing classic rock. Despite being less than 60 miles (97 km) from Birmingham, the signal of Arrow 100.7 did not cover any of the Birmingham metropolitan area. This was due in part to WHMA-FM broadcasting from Anniston at 100.5 and covering a significant part of the Birmingham area.

In 2001, WHMA-FM changed its city of license from Anniston to College Park, Georgia, and became a part of the Atlanta radio market as WWWQ, leaving an open broadcasting channel for central Alabama. The ownership for WLXY petitioned to change the station's dial position from 100.7 to 100.5 in order to move its transmission tower closer to Birmingham and to boost its broadcast power, and in 2003, this petition was approved. In anticipation of its move into the Birmingham market, WLXY changed formats and call letters in early 2003. Looking to challenge Birmingham's alternative music station WRAX (107.7 FM), the station adopted a similar format with the new call letters WANZ. The station's on-air name was "Z-100.7". In April 2003, WANZ changed its dial position to 100.5 and began broadcasting from a taller tower near Vance, enabling its signal to cover both the Birmingham and Tuscaloosa markets. With the new dial position, the station changed its name to "Z-100.5".

In 2005, Apex Broadcasting, the owners of WANZ and several Tuscaloosa-area stations, sold their radio properties to Citadel Communications, owners of five stations in the Birmingham market including WRAX. Not wanting to have two stations competing in the same format, the call letters and other intellectual property of WRAX were transferred to 100.5 FM in March 2005.

=== Switch to sports talk ===
At 3:00 p.m. on November 29, 2006, 100.5 became the FM home frequency of WJOX, beginning a simulcast of the AM sports talk station. The move came suddenly and unannounced on November 28, with the firing of the entire WRAX staff. On December 1, WRAX changed its call letters to WJOX, and WJOX changed its call letters to WSPZ. Reacting to the change in format at WRAX, Clear Channel Communications changed the format of its WENN-FM on December 2, thus returning alternative rock to the airwaves of Birmingham.

WJOX-FM and WSPZ began separate broadcast schedules on January 8, 2007, with many of the established programs from the former WJOX moving to the new FM sports outlet. The program schedule on WJOX-FM was:

- Mornings: The Opening Drive, with Tony Kurre, former University of Alabama quarterback Jay Barker, and former Auburn University placekicker Al Del Greco
- Mid-days: The Roundtable with Lance Taylor & Ian Fitzsimmons roundtableradio.com
- Afternoons: The Paul Finebaum Radio Network

=== Call sign and format changes for 100.5 frequency ===
On July 31, 2008, Citadel changed the callsign of the station to WWMM (the double "M's" in the call letters standing for the station's slogan–"Birmingham's Modern Music") and the city of license from Northport to Helena.

The sports talk format and WJOX call-sign were moved to 94.5 FM on July 6 and 31, respectively, as 100.5 began simulcasting on 94.5 as part of the transition. The rumors were 100.5 would flip to rhythmic AC as "100.5 The Vibe", but this never materialized, and WWMM would instead flip to adult album alternative (Triple-A or AAA for short) as "Live 100.5, Birmingham's Modern Music" at 10:05 a.m. on August 15. The new station name and slogan were debuted live on-air by Scott Register, host of Reg's Coffee House, a local radio show, which held a special Friday edition of the program to kick off Live (the first song on the show was "How the Day Sounds" by Greg Laswell.) At Noon, the station launched regular programming, with the first song being "Radio Nowhere" by Bruce Springsteen.

As WWMM, the station was never able to gain a significant share of local listenership. As rumors of a potential change in format began to surface, a Facebook group to save "Live 100.5" from the change (led by Jeff Tenner, owner of station sponsor Soca Clothing) garnered over 13,000 members after just a few days, and an online petition was started that garnered over 11,000 signatures to urge station management not to change the station's format. However, it served to be moot, as Citadel announced on February 14, 2010, that 100.5 would drop the format on February 22 in favor of a simulcast of sister station WAPI. Reg's Coffee House aired its last show on 100.5 the same day; as a show of support for the protestors of the impending change, Register signed the show off with "Uprising" by Muse. The station then ran jockless until the change at 12:01 a.m. on February 22. The stations were co-branded as "100-WAPI". Citadel merged with Cumulus Media on September 16, 2011.

=== Commitment to "live and local" programming ===
The on-air line-up of 100-WAPI featured Matt Murphy and Valerie Vining in the morning, and Richard Dixon in the afternoons. Weekends and evenings featured national hosts like Mark Levin, Mike Huckabee, Kim Kommando, Bill Handel and others. WAPI was well known locally for covering breaking news events live.

The station achieved even more prominence when multiple tornadoes struck Alabama on April 27, 2011. Jim Stefkovich of the National Weather Service accurately predicted on WAPI ten hours before the tornadoes that the destruction would be very high and that there would be loss of life. As the tornado moved across northern Birmingham, WAPI hosts described it from their studio window overlooking downtown Birmingham. In the hours following the tornado, WAPI mobilized listeners to respond to critical needs, collecting and delivering more than two million dollars' worth of basic supplies (ten semi-trucks) in the hardest-hit areas. In many cases, the WAPI delivery was the first help to arrive in some areas. WAPI continued to match needs and volunteers over the next ten days and the public service efforts of the station were covered by news media like the CBS Evening News and BBC News. Hundreds of volunteers worked with radio station staffers to organize and conduct the massive aid deliveries quickly.

=== JOX 2: ESPN 100.5 ===
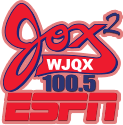
Logo as "JOX 2"

On July 24, 2013, the station announced it would join ESPN Radio as a sister station to WJOX-FM. This resulted in WAPI returning exclusively to 1070 AM. Originally announced as "ESPN Radio 100.5", the station announced it would simulcast several shows from WJOX-FM and call itself "JOX 2: ESPN 100.5". The change came one month after WZNN dropped the format and brought the sports format back to the 100.5 frequency after five years.

This caused a name change on WDGM in Tuscaloosa, as it was at the time a simulcast partner of WJOX as 99.1 The Deuce. On August 1, WAPI-FM changed its callsign to WJQX to match the format. On August 12, WJQX made the flip to sports.

In August 2025, WJQX rebranded as "Jox Tuscaloosa", now targeting the Tuscaloosa radio market.
