= WLXQ =

- Greensboro, Alabama; United States
- Broadcast area: Tuscaloosa and vicinity
- Frequency: 99.1 MHz

Programming
- Format: Contemporary Christian
- Network: K-Love

Ownership
- Owner: Educational Media Foundation; (K-LOVE Inc.)
- Sister stations: WKVV

History
- First air date: 2002 (as WDGM)
- Former call signs: WDGM (2001–2016)

Technical information
- Licensing authority: FCC
- Facility ID: 86803
- Class: C3
- ERP: 6,400 watts
- HAAT: 197.3 meters (647 feet)
- Transmitter coordinates: 32°52′40″N 87°36′53″W

Links
- Public license information: Public file; LMS
- Webcast: Listen live
- Website: k-love.com

WLXQ (K-Love 99.1 FM) is a radio station licensed to serve Greensboro, Alabama, United States. The station is owned by Educational Media Foundation.

The station's former broadcast schedule was initiated when the station was owned by Cumulus Media, serving as a repeater of sports radio-formatted WJOX in Birmingham, with the branding "The Deuce" and slogan "Tuscaloosa's Home for Jox!". While the then-WDGM still broadcast JOX programming from 6 a.m. to 5 p.m., on weekdays the rest of its schedule competes with WJOX including original programming from 5-8 p.m., on weekdays, a weekly Saturday show and affiliation with ESPN Radio in contrast to WJOX's affiliation with CBS Sports Radio. Since the change in ownership to Townsquare Media, the branding of the station has unofficially changed to "Tuscaloosa's Sports Authority, 99.1 WDGM" dropping the "Deuce" moniker.

This station once served as one of the former Tuscaloosa affiliates for the Crimson Tide Sports Network, for Alabama football games. This station is a former flagship for Crimson Tide Softball broadcasts.

== Former Sports Schedule ==
Regular Weekday Schedule (as of June 2013)
| Airtime (Central) | Program | Hosts |
|---|---|---|
| 6 a.m. – 10 a.m. | The Opening Drive (WJOX) | Jay Barker, Al Del Greco and Tony Kurre |
| 10 a.m. – 2 p.m. | The Matt & Scott Spectacular (WJOX) | Matt McClearin and Scot Harrison |
| 2 p.m. – 6 p.m. | The Jox Roundtable (WJOX) | Lance Taylor, Jim Dunaway and Ryan Brown |
| 6 p.m. – 8 p.m. | The Game | Ryan Fowler |

With the exception of Crimson Cover - hosted by Chase Goodbread, Mike Parker and John Copeland - that aired Saturday mornings and Crimson Tide Sports Network broadcasts, all weekend programming came from ESPN Radio.

== History ==
On August 8, 2000, Warrior Broadcasting, Inc., received a construction permit from the Federal Communications Commission for a new FM radio station broadcasting with 25,000 watts of effective radiated power at 99.1 MHz to serve Greensboro, Alabama. The new station was assigned the call letters WDGM by the FCC on April 16, 2001. On August 7, 2001, WDGM received a modified permit that allowed them to relocate the planned transmitter site a few miles northeast, raise the antenna from 100 meters to 190 meters in height above average terrain, and lower the effective radiated power to just 3,200 watts. WDGM received its license to cover from the FCC on May 17, 2002.

On July 20, 2004, Warrior Broadcasting, Inc. (James E. Shaw, president) agreed to sell WDGM to Apex Broadcasting, Inc. (Voncile R. Pearce, president) for a total sale price of $925,000. The deal was approved by the FCC on December 21, 2004, and the transaction was consummated on December 30, 2004.

In February 2005, Apex Broadcasting Inc. (Houston L. Pearce, chairman) reached an agreement to sell WDGM and six other radio stations in Alabama to Citadel Broadcasting (Farid Suleman, chairman/CEO) for a reported sale price of $29 million. The deal was approved by the FCC on May 11, 2005, and the transaction was consummated on July 12, 2005.

In December 2008, the station dropped its "Oldies 99.1" branding and satellite-fed "True Oldies Channel" programming in favor of a sports talk format branded as "The Deuce" with the slogan "Tuscaloosa's Home for Jox!". The "True Oldies Channel" programming is now heard in the Tuscaloosa area on WJRD (1150 AM and 102.1 FM). Citadel merged with Cumulus Media on September 16, 2011.

Cumulus sold WDGM and its sister stations to Townsquare Media effective July 31, 2012.

On August 30, 2013, the station dropped all WJOX programs and launched as an independent sports station as Tide 99.1 promoting themselves as "The Home Of Alabama Sports".

In May 2016, Townsquare have announced a plan to sell off WDGM to Educational Media Foundation for $100,000. On June 30, 2016, upon the consummation of the purchase by EMF, the station flipped to K-Love, taking the new calls of WLXQ on July 1, 2016.
