= WJLD =

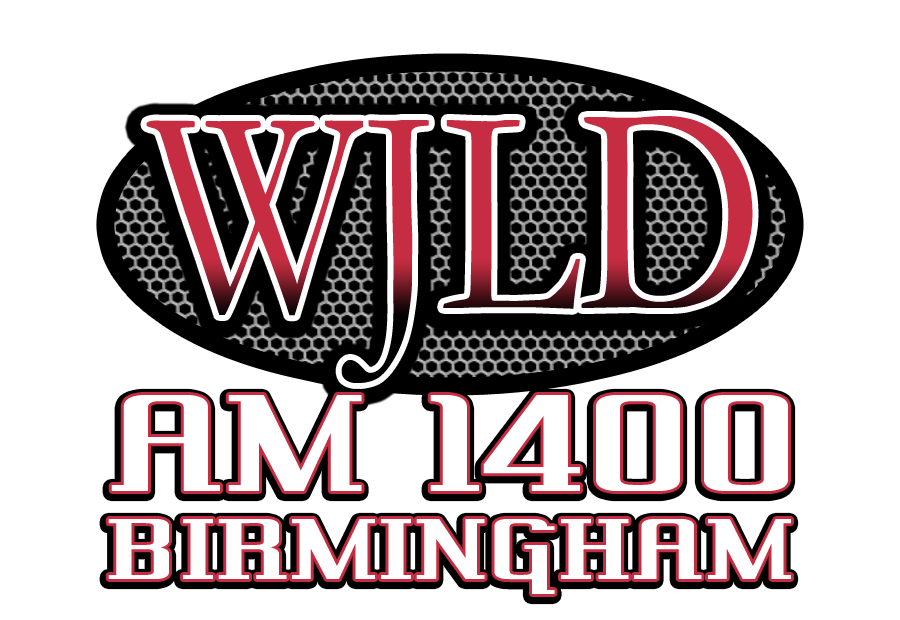
- Fairfield, Alabama; United States
- Broadcast area: Birmingham, Alabama
- Frequency: 1400 kHz (HD Radio)
- Branding: WJLD 104.1 FM

Programming
- Format: Urban oldies Blues

Ownership
- Owner: Gary Richardson; (Richardson Broadcasting Corporation)
- Sister stations: WIXI

History
- First air date: April 19, 1942
- Call sign meaning: J. L. Doss, original owner

Technical information
- Licensing authority: FCC
- Facility ID: 56299
- Class: C
- Power: 1,000 watts unlimited
- Transmitter coordinates: 33°28′26″N 86°53′01″W
- Translator: 104.1 W281AB (Mountain Brook)

Links
- Public license information: Public file; LMS
- Webcast: Listen Live
- Website: wjldradio.com

WJLD (1400 AM) is a radio station licensed to Fairfield, Alabama, that serves most of the Birmingham metropolitan area. The station offers talk and music programming targeted towards African-American listeners, including a mixture of locally originated talk programming and urban oldies music. The station is owned by Richardson Broadcasting Corporation, a company based in Birmingham. Richardson Broadcasting Corporation also owns WAYE 1220 AM in Birmingham, Alabama and has construction permits for low power television stations in Dothan, Montgomery and Selma Alabama. The station's studios and transmitter are located separately in Southwest Birmingham.

== Station history ==
Originally licensed to nearby Bessemer, Alabama, WJLD began On April 19, 1942. as an affiliate of the Mutual Broadcasting System. It was the fourth station licensed to serve the Birmingham area, following WAPI, WBRC and WSGN. Programming on WJLD initially consisted of popular music, news programs and radio adventure shows such as Superman and Tom Mix. In 1943, the station began selling airtime to people who sang or played urban contemporary gospel music. Throughout the 1940s and into the early 1950s, the station broadcast, by today's standards, a wide variety of music programming, including country music and gospel music as well as rhythm and blues music.

On May 23, 1948, WJLD launched a companion FM station, WJLN-FM (104.7). The FM station originally simulcast much of the programming of the AM station, but by the late 1960s began playing album-oriented rock music at night. In the mid-1970s, the FM station assumed its current call letters, WZZK; the WJLD owners sold WZZK some years later.

In 1954, WJLD began exclusively targeting African-American listeners with a mix of music and talk programming. Until the debut of WENN-FM in 1969, it was the only black-oriented station in Birmingham that broadcast at night, since the other similarly-formatted AM station was required by the Federal Communications Commission to sign off at sunset. During the mid-1970s, it was one of four AM stations in the Birmingham market competing for African-American listeners.

With the increased popularity of FM stations during the 1970s and early 1980s, WJLD began adding more talk programming to its format and decreased the amount of current music in its rotation. In 1989, the station dropped current music entirely and became a full-time urban oldies station.

The 2000s have witnessed a continued commitment to serving the Birmingham area's African-American community on WJLD's part. Station owner Gary Richardson, a longtime employee, hosts a two-hour morning talk show, and the station presently programs a blues and Southern soul music format six days a week, with both local personalities and the syndicated Mississippi-based American Blues Network. Richardson is also the mayor of the Birmingham suburb of Midfield. In keeping with tradition, Sunday programming consists of gospel music and church broadcasts.

In 2008 Richardson Broadcasting acquired the license for W281AB, an FM translator at 104.1 MHz broadcasting at 250 watts. WJLD 1400 began simulcasting on 104.1 soon afterward. This lasted until July 29, 2011, when W281AB switched to a simulcast of WMJJ-HD2.

== See also ==
- List of radio stations in Alabama
