= WZZK-FM =

Coordinates: 33.485°N 86.807°W

- Birmingham, Alabama; United States
- Broadcast area: Birmingham metropolitan area - North-Central Alabama
- Frequency: 104.7 MHz (HD Radio)
- Branding: 104.7 WZZK

Programming
- Format: New country
- Subchannels: HD2: Air1

Ownership
- Owner: SummitMedia, LLC; (SM-WZZK, LLC)
- Sister stations: WAGG, WBHJ, WBHK, WBPT, WPYA

History
- First air date: 1948
- Former call signs: WJLN (1948–1973)

Technical information
- Licensing authority: FCC
- Facility ID: 48724
- Class: C0
- ERP: 100,000 watts
- HAAT: 404 meters (1,325 ft)
- Translator: HD2: 102.1 W271BN (Birmingham)

Links
- Public license information: Public file; LMS
- Webcast: Listen live
- Website: www.wzzk.com

WZZK-FM (104.7 FM) is a commercial radio station licensed to Birmingham, Alabama, United States, that serves Northern and Central Alabama with a country radio format. It is the flagship of the Rick and Bubba Morning Show. The station is owned by SummitMedia alongside six other stations sharing studios in the Cahaba neighborhood in far southeastern Birmingham.

WZZK's transmitter is sited off Golden Crest Drive, atop Red Mountain. WZZK broadcasts in HD Radio; the HD2 subchannel carries the Air1 network, which feeds FM translator W271BN at 102.1 MHz.

== History ==
=== R&B and Album Rock ===
The 104.7 frequency signed on the air in 1948. It was put on the air as the sister station of WJLD 1400 AM. The original call sign was WJLN-FM, simulcasting its AM station. They were owned by Johnson Broadcasting and their city of license was Bessemer. In the 1960s, WJLD and WJLN-FM had an R&B music format aimed at Birmingham's black community. By the end of the 60s, WJLN-FM began playing progressive rock music at night, while continuing the daytime simulcast of WJLD.

In 1973, the call letters were changed to WZZK. With the new call sign, WZZK became a full-time album-oriented rock (AOR) station. Its main competitor in this rock format was 106.9 WERC-FM. However, the station failed to attract a significant listening audience. In 1977, WVOK-FM (K-99) made its debut as another album rock station. With the format divided among several stations, WZZK decided to abandon AOR a year later.

=== Country music ===
In 1978, WZZK became the first FM station in Birmingham to switch to country music. It decided to challenge long-time country music market leader WYDE 850 AM. WZZK soon became the top-rated radio station in Birmingham. Initially, WZZK was automated, with no live DJs.

The station began adding announcers in 1980 and began to assert itself with advertising and promotions. By 1982, the success of WZZK forced WYDE to drop the country music it had aired since 1965. Throughout most of the 1980s and 1990s, WZZK was ranked no lower than #3 in the Birmingham Arbitron ratings, despite challenges from other stations. First 99.5 WQUS switched to country music, then 106.9 WBMH, later WIKX. Neither station made a significant impact; in fact, the parent company of WZZK bought WIKX in 1991 and changed its format.

In 1985, the first of two AM stations that shared the WZZK call letters made its debut. Longtime Top 40 powerhouse 610 WSGN was purchased and began a simulcast that continued until 1998. The AM station is now a successful urban gospel station. In 2003, the second WZZK on the AM dial debuted as a classic country station at 1320 AM (now WENN). The second WZZK AM changed formats in January 2006, and is now an classic hits/adult contemporary outlet.

=== New competition ===
The most serious and successful challenge to WZZK's dominance came in 1994, when WZBQ, a station licensed to Jasper that had previously targeted the Tuscaloosa area, moved its studios to Birmingham and relaunched itself as WOWC. The new competitor, by then having the new call letters WDXB, gradually began chipping away at WZZK's audience. In 2002, it relocated its transmitter to Red Mountain, where most of the market's FM stations have their towers. That gave it a signal almost equal to WZZK's. Throughout the 2000s, WZZK and WDXB have taken turns as the leading country music station in Birmingham.

In 1999, WZZK was given the National Association of Broadcasters (NAB) "Friend In Need Radio Award." It won for outstanding service in the face of natural disasters.

=== Changes in morning shows and ownership ===
On January 2, 2007, Cox Radio announced that the popular morning drive time, nationally syndicated Rick and Bubba Show would be moving from crosstown station 94.5 WYSF to WZZK, effective the next day. At the end of 2024, Bill Bussey (aka "Bubba") decided to step away from morning radio. Rick Burgess continues as the host, although the name remains The Rick and Bubba Show.

On July 20, 2012, Cox Radio, Inc. announced the sale of WZZK and 22 other stations to SummitMedia LLC for $66.25 million. The sale was consummated on May 3, 2013.
