= WERC =

WERC may refer to:

- WERC (AM), a radio station (960 AM) licensed to Birmingham, Alabama, United States
- WERC-FM, a radio station (105.5 FM) licensed to Hoover, Alabama, United States
