= Alt 99.1 =

Alt 99.1 or ALT 99.1 may refer to:

- WDXB-HD2 and W256CD, an HD Radio digital subchannel (102.5-2 FM) and its low-power analog translator (99.1 FM) – licensed to Pelham and Fultondate, Alabama, United States, respectively – which have been branded Alt 99.1 since 2017
- WMMS-HD2 and W256BT, an HD Radio digital subchannel (100.7-2 FM) and its low-power analog translator (99.1 FM) – both licensed to Cleveland, Ohio, United States – which were branded ALT 99.1 from 2017 to 2020
