= WKVV =

Coordinates: 33.4844°N 86.8069°W

- Gardendale, Alabama; United States
- Broadcast area: Greater Birmingham
- Frequency: 97.3 MHz (HD Radio)

Programming
- Format: Christian adult contemporary
- Subchannels: HD2: K-Love Eras; HD3: K-Love Pop!
- Network: K-Love

Ownership
- Owner: Educational Media Foundation; (K-LOVE Inc.)

History
- First air date: November 2, 1998
- Former call signs: WEDA (1998–1999); WRLR (1999–2001); WODL (2001–2004); WNCB (2004–2011); WZNN (2011–2013); WEZZ-FM (2013–2016); WPYA (2016–2025)
- Call sign meaning: "K-Love"

Technical information
- Licensing authority: FCC
- Facility ID: 71417
- Class: C2
- ERP: 6,200 watts
- HAAT: 404 meters (1,325 ft)

Links
- Public license information: Public file; LMS
- Webcast: Listen live
- Website: www.klove.com

WKVV (97.3 FM) is a non-commercial radio station licensed to Gardendale, Alabama, United States, and serving Greater Birmingham. It is owned by the Educational Media Foundation (d/b/a K-Love Inc.) as the regional affiliate for K-Love.

WKVV is a Class C2 station. It has an effective radiated power (ERP) of 6,200 watts. The transmitter is atop Red Mountain. WKVV broadcasts using HD Radio technology. Its HD2 and HD3 subchannel carry K-Love Eras and K-Love Pop formats.

== History ==
=== Top 40 ===
WKVV is one of the youngest full-power FM stations in the Birmingham radio market. It signed on the air on November 2, 1998. Its call sign was WEDA and its city of license was Homewood. It began with a Top 40 (CHR) format. The original moniker was "Hot 97.3".

Birmingham had not had a CHR station since WAPI-FM (now WJOX-FM) changed formats in 1994, and the owners were hoping to fill that niche. However, WQEN, a CHR station licensed to Gadsden, had just made the move into the Birmingham market. It began broadcasting from a taller tower closer to Birmingham earlier in the year and was more successful in the Arbitron ratings than WEDA.

=== Active rock and oldies ===
In 1999, Atlanta-based Cox Radio purchased WEDA from the local investors who owned the station, changed the call letters to WRLR, and flipped the format to active rock as "Real Rock 97.3". Initially, the station was moderately successful. However, the station was only powered at 640 watts ERP. The limited signal and competition from modern rock/alternative station WRAX caused WRLR to become one of the lowest rated FM stations in Birmingham.

In October 2001, WRLR's sister station, WODL "Oldies 106.9," changed its format to all 1980s music and became known as WBPT, "106-9 the Point". Cox moved the oldies format and call letters to 97.3, and the station became known as "Oldies 97.3 WODL". Once again, the weak signal of 97.3 proved to be a hindrance to the station's success. Also, the popularity of oldies stations focusing on music from the 1960s began to decline around this time.

In June 2004, WODL got a power boost, increasing from 640 watts to 6,400 watts. In addition, the station's city of license changed from Homewood to Gardendale. In July of that year, the station updated its format from oldies to music strictly from the 1970s. The station was known as "70s Hit Radio, 97-3 WODL." Core artists included Chicago, the Doobie Brothers, Stevie Wonder, The Eagles, Hall and Oates, Fleetwood Mac, Earth, Wind and Fire, James Taylor and other 1970s Top 40 artists.

=== Country and sports ===
After less than three months as a 1970s oldies station, the station once again changed formats to a youthful, hot country music format in September 2004, placing it in competition with co-owned country station WZZK-FM and cross-town rival WDXB, which both had more mainstream country formats. The call letters were changed to WNCB by the Federal Communications Commission on October 19, 2004. From the time of the format switch until March 11, 2010, the station was known on the air as "New Country 97.3". On that date, it was rebranded as "97.3 The Buck".

On August 30, 2011, at 2 p.m., after playing "Dirt Road Anthem" by Jason Aldean and the first few seconds of "You Lie" by The Band Perry, WNCB changed its format to sports, branded as "97.3 The Zone". Two days later, on September 1, 2011, the station changed its call letters to WZNN, reflecting the new on-air name.

On October 17, 2011, WZNN began simulcasting all of its local programming (6-9 a.m. and 12-2 p.m.) on WTXK in Montgomery. The station dropped its affiliation with Yahoo! Sports Radio on August 20, 2012, and became the new network affiliate in the Birmingham market for ESPN Radio. At that time, the station modified its branding to "ESPN Radio 97.3 the Zone". On that same day, the station signed on its HD2 subchannel, carrying the former old-school hip-hop and R&B format of WENN, which remained on FM translator W270BW (102.1 FM).

The station began to publicly court Paul Finebaum to join its line up. Finebaum is a noted radio host and expert on college sports in the South. Finebaum was working for sports rival WJOX up until January 21, 2013. The Zone then hired WJOX's former program director, Ryan Haney, before Citadel (WJOX's parent company) brought a lawsuit that kept him away from WZNN. Haney returned to WJOX in March 2013.

=== SummitMedia ownership ===
On July 20, 2012, Cox Radio, Inc. announced the sale of WZNN and 22 other stations to SummitMedia LLC for $66.25 million. The sale was consummated on May 3, 2013.

On February 11, 2013, the station pulled the plug on some of its specialty programming, including "Eyes on Auburn", "Tider Insider", and "The Midnight Meltdown". It began airing national ESPN Radio programming in most of those time slots.

On April 2, 2013, Fourth Quarter hosts Max Howell and Tim Melton of "The 4th Quarter" resigned from the station. They said it was because they were asked by the program director to be "more controversial". Max Howell posted on Facebook that "I'm not willing to do that kind of show . . . it's not my style and never has been."

On May 6, 2013, the station cancelled the popular late morning Straight Talk show featuring Matt Coulter and former Alabama head basketball coach Wimp Sanderson. Other shows at the time included the "Smashmouth Radio Network" with Kevin Scarbinsky and Scott Griffin in morning drive time, "The Sports Czars" with Speedy, Greg and Helmsey at midday, The Sports Zone with Matt Coulter and Kip Keefer in afternoon drive, and the Eli and Stan Show with Eli Gold and Stan White.

=== Soft AC ===
On June 25, 2013, the Birmingham News reported that the station would drop sports talk for an unannounced format on June 28. On that day, at 2 p.m., the station began stunting with Hawaiian music, branded as "97.3 Hula FM". At midnight on July 4, the stunting switched to patriotic music, branded as "The Pledge". At 12:45 a.m. on July 5, the station shifted to adult hits, branded as "Y'all 97.3". However, "Y'all" was considered to be another form of stunting, as the station aired little to no on-air imaging, as well as a very short playlist that was repeated every couple of hours. The "stunt" lasted nearly 4 1/2 months, although the playlist expanded significantly.

On November 15, 2013, WZNN began simulcasting on WENN as "102.1 Y'all FM" (with translator W271BN), which resulted in the discontinuation of the "Power" old school hip-hop/R&B format after nearly two years. The "Y'all" adult hits format moved to WENN and W271BN on November 21, when WZNN switched to a soft adult contemporary format, branded as "Easy 97.3". It adopted the call sign WEZZ-FM on November 26, 2013.

On October 24, 2014, WEZZ and rival WMJJ flipped to Christmas music within minutes of each other. WEZZ became the third station in the United States to flip to Christmas music during the 2014 holiday season, following WMJJ and WEZW in New Jersey. It resumed its regular format on December 26 of the same year.

=== Hot AC ===
On March 14, 2016, at 3 p.m., WEZZ-FM flipped to hot adult contemporary, branded as "97.3 Play". The station changed its callsign to WPYA on March 21, 2016.

On April 1, 2021, WPYA picked up the rights to air The Ace & TJ Show in Birmingham after 19 years on longtime affiliate WQEN. When the station began airing the show on April 5, WPYA rebranded as "Mix 97.3", becoming the third and final former "Play" station to rebrand after sister stations WVEZ in Louisville and WURV in Richmond. WPYA also changed its slogan to "The Best Mix of 2K and Today While You Work".

=== Return to Top 40 ===
In September 2023, WPYA flipped back to Top 40/CHR as "Today's Hits 97.3". The move came after a three-month playlist shift, by increasing spins of currents.

In addition, WPYA dropped "Ace & TJ" from mornings, and replaced them with the nationally syndicated Tino Cochino Radio show.

On July 10, 2025, SummitMedia sold WPYA to K-Love Inc and was expected to flip to K-Love after closing.

=== K-Love ===
On October 1, 2025, WPYA changed their format from Top 40/CHR to the K-Love contemporary Christian format, with new WKVV call letters pending.

== Previous logos ==
WNCB - New Country 97.3

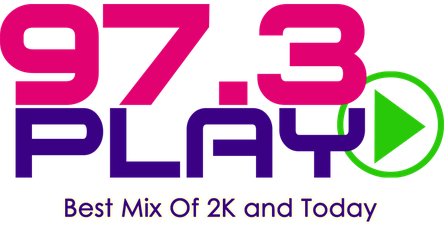
WPYA - 97.3 Play

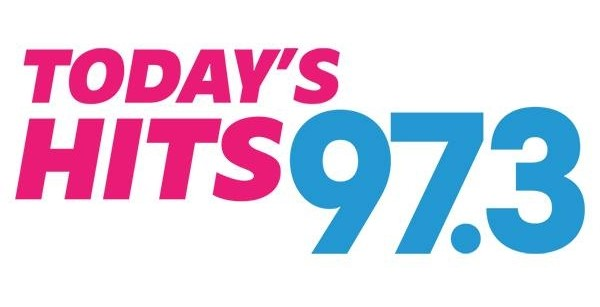
WPYA - Today's Hits 97.3
