= Rick and Bubba =

American radio show

The Rick & Bubba Show
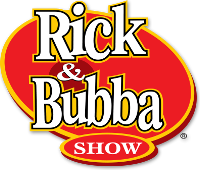
- Genre: Talk radio
- Running time: 5 hours
- Country of origin: U.S.
- Home station: WZZK-FM
- Starring: Rick Burgess; Bill "Bubba" Bussey; Calvin "Speedy" Wilburn "The Real" Greg Burgess; Michael "Helmsey" Helms; Chris "Eddie Van" Adler "Don Juan" DeMarco Williams
- Original release: January 8, 1994 – December 13, 2024
- Website: http://www.rickandbubba.com

Rick and Bubba
- Also known as: The Rick & Bubba Show
- Starring: Rick Burgess; Bill 'Bubba' Bussey; Calvin 'Speedy' Wilburn 'The Real' Greg Burgess; Michael 'Helmsey' Helms; Chris 'Eddie Van' Adler '"Don Juan" DeMarco Williams
- Country of origin: United States

Production
- Running time: 5 hours Live from 5:00am – 10:00am Central

Original release
- Network: Turner South
- Release: September 27, 2002 – April 28, 2006

The Rick and Bubba Show was an American comedy radio show based in Birmingham, Alabama. Nationally syndicated and produced at WZZK-FM, the show was live every weekday for five hours and was hosted by Rick Burgess and Bill "Bubba" Bussey.

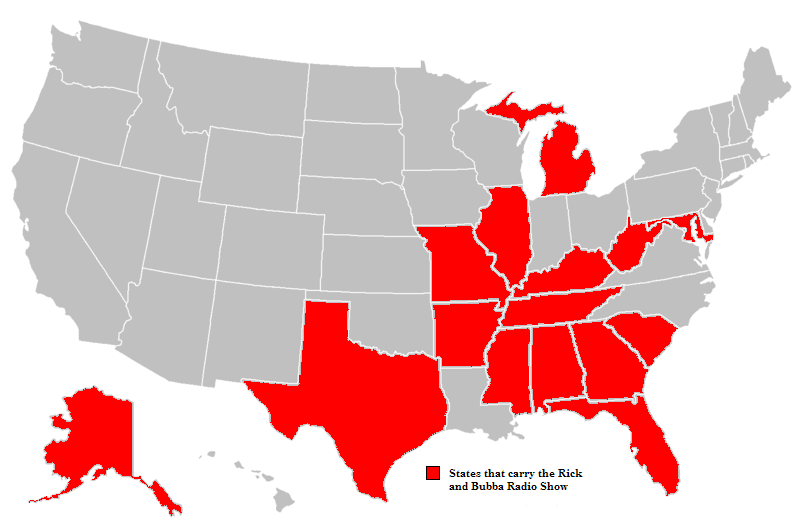
States that carry "The Rick & Bubba Show" on radio.

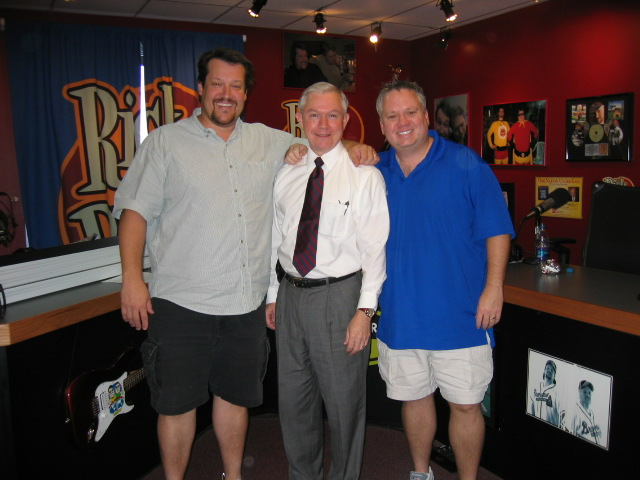
Jeff Sessions with Rick and Bubba in 2006

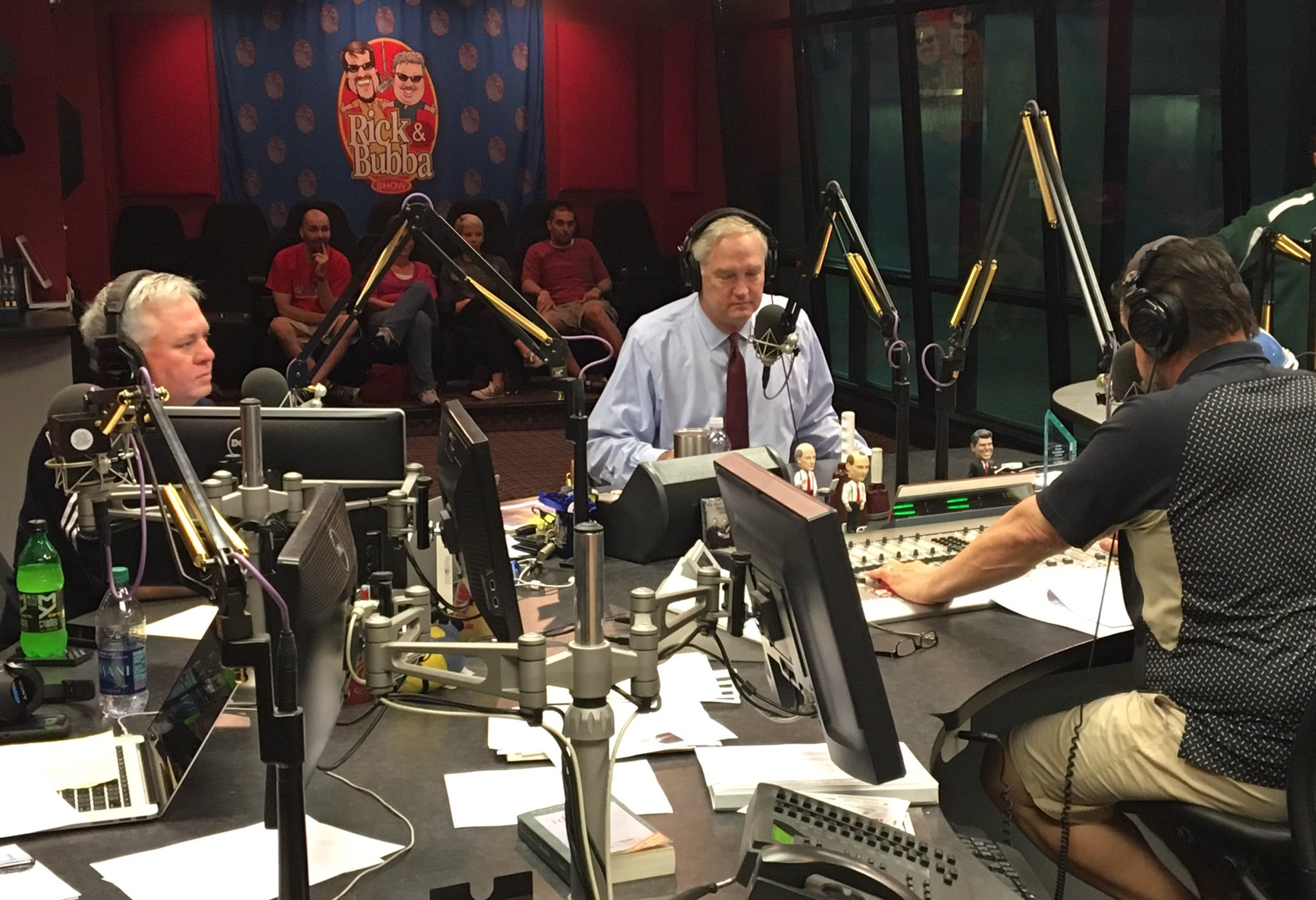
Luther Strange on the Rick and Bubba Show in 2017

The show ended on Friday, December 13, 2024, when Bill "Bubba" Bussey's contract was not renewed. In January 2025, The Rick Burgess Show premiered, with most of the cast remaining and most of the affiliated radio stations continuing to carry the program.

== The Rick and Bubba Radio Show ==
The radio program began on January 8, 1994. Rick Burgess was hosting the wake-up show on 103.7 WQEN in the Birmingham radio market and asked the station's chief engineer, Bill "Bubba" Bussey, to co-host it with him. The pairing proved successful. Soon after, Calvin "Speedy" Wilburn, named after Speed Racer, joined the show. Former intern "Don Juan" DeMarco Williams later joined the cast.

The show later moved to 94.5 WYSF in Birmingham. Beginning in 2007, it was the morning show on WZZK-FM, a country music station.

On February 11, 2008, the broadcast location of the show moved to the "Rick and Bubba Broadcast Plaza and Teleport" in Vestavia Hills, which housed the studio as well as management offices for the show. This location allowed fans to see the show from the sidewalk inside Vestavia Hills City Center, as well as from the "Golden Ticket" seats inside the studio.

In March 2009, The Rick and Bubba Show was briefly heard on XM Radio Channel 158.

Rick's brother, Greg Burgess, took Don Juan's place upon Don Juan's departure in the early 2010s. Other permanent cast members included Michael "Helmsey" Helms and former intern Chris "Eddie Van" Adler.

A televised version of the show premiered on November 1, 2012, on Heartland. It lasted until February 1, 2016. It had also been seen on the Turner South Network.

In January 2022, The Rick and Bubba Show moved to their "No Name Studio" (later named "Big Boy Studio") at SummitMedia in Birmingham. SummitMedia owns WZZK-FM and its facilities have studios for several radio stations that broadcast across the area.

On February 1, 2024, after their 7:00 am break, Rick and Bubba announced their co-hosted show would be ending on December 13, 2024. Helmsey later departed the show on August 16, 2024, to coach the men and women tennis teams at Jacksonville State University. On November 27, 2024, Bubba announced he would be launching a podcast starting in 2025 called “Bubba on the Lake”. Rick Bubba, Speedy, Greg, and Adler continued on the air until their "Big Year Ender" on December 13, 2024. "Best Of" segments ran until the premiere of "The Rick Burgess Show" on January 6, 2025.

The show discussed a variety of topics, often in a comedic way, including current events, entertainment, sports, family, and faith. Celebrity guest appearances and interviews were common on the show (with President Donald J. Trump crediting the show as his first radio interview during his first term), as were games such as Drive-Thru Password, Country Song or It Ain't, Good Ol' Boy Theater, and the Wheel of Meat. Over the years, the cast developed popular characters, such as Rick's Car Wash Joe and Dicky Nadmire (a stereotypical fan of Alabama football) and Bubba's Dippin' Dan. Events like Fat Fest and Turkey Toss were also popular hits. Until their 2022 studio move, the show regularly hosted college interns who were given nicknames by the staff.

The Rick Burgess Show premiered on January 6, 2025. Returning with Rick Burgess were Speedy, Greg, and Adler.

== Books ==
Their first book, Rick & Bubba's Expert Guide to God, Country, Family & Anything Else We Can Think Of (ISBN 0-8499-0992-9), was published in March 2006, and quickly became a best-seller at Amazon.com and Books-A-Million as well as making the New York Times best seller list at the number 7 spot in the Miscellaneous category.

- Rick & Bubba's Expert Guide to God, Country, Family & Anything Else We Can Think Of (ISBN 0-8499-0992-9), March 2006
- The Rick and Bubba Code: The Two Sexiest Fat Men Alive Unlock the Mysteries of the Universe (ISBN 0-8499-1877-4), June 2007
- Rick and Bubba for President: The Two Sexiest Fat Men Alive Take on Washington (ISBN 0-8499-1878-2), June 2008.
- Rick and Bubba's Big Honkin' Book of Huntin (ISBN 1-4016-0401-3), September 2008
- Rick and Bubba's Guide to the Almost Nearly Perfect Marriage (ISBN 1-4016-0399-8), June 2009.
- Rick and Bubba's Big Honkin' Book of Grub (ISBN 1-4016-0402-1), March 2010
- We Be Big: The Mostly True Story of How We Became Rick and Bubba (ISBN 1-4016-0400-5), March 2011

== Audio recordings ==
The Rick and Bubba Show released "best of" CDs every year since 1998. The 2006 release Radio Gold, Volume 1, reached the number 9 spot on the Billboard Top Comedy Albums chart.

- The Smell Of Success (1998)
- Stay In It! Volume 1 (1999)
- Stay In It! Volume 2 (1999)
- Hey Buddy... Ya Broadcasting (2000)
- A Radio Oddity (2001)
- She Commenced To Shaving (2002)
- Got It Like We Like It! (2003)
- How 'bout That! (2004)
- Pull Our Finger! (2005)
- Radio Gold (2006)
- ... and Cake (2007)
- 14 Years and Still No Awards (2008)
- Radio Revolution (2009)
- I Don't Think We Got the Tools to Pull This Off (2010)
- Good Night Look at That! (2011)
- Triple Option (2012)
- Again.... Let Me Be Clear (2013)
- XXL One Score and Several Pounds Ago (2014)
- Wow! What a Wheel! (2015)
- Who's Got It Better Than Us? (2016)
- Can’t Have Nuthin’ (2017)
- Making Radio Great Again (2018)
- 25 Big Ones (2019)
- Follow the Science...A Radio Pandemic (2020)
- Heard Immunity (2021)
- Where's The Bathroom? (2022)
- Ruff Patch (2023)
- Run Me A Z & Shut Er Down (2024)

The Rick Burgess Show followed suit and released its first "best of" album at the end of 2025.
