= WBPT =

- Homewood, Alabama; United States
- Broadcast area: Greater Birmingham; Central Alabama
- Frequency: 106.9 MHz (HD Radio)
- Branding: Classic Rock 106.9

Programming
- Format: Classic rock
- Subchannels: HD2: Alternative rock; HD3: AAA
- Affiliations: Crimson Tide Sports Network

Ownership
- Owner: SummitMedia; (SM-WBPT, LLC)
- Sister stations: WAGG, WBHJ, WBHK, WENN, WZZK-FM

History
- First air date: June 1959
- Former call signs: WBRC-FM (1957–1972); WERC-FM (1972–1977); WKXX (1977–1991); WBMH (1991); WIKX (1991–1992); WODL (1992–2001)
- Call sign meaning: Formerly branded as "The Point"

Technical information
- Licensing authority: FCC
- Facility ID: 5355
- Class: C0
- ERP: 100,000 watts
- HAAT: 404 meters (1,325 ft)
- Transmitter coordinates: 33°29′4″N 86°48′25″W
- Translators: HD2: 100.1 W261BX (Birmingham); HD3: 107.3 W297BF (Birmingham)

Links
- Public license information: Public file; LMS
- Webcast: Listen live; Listen live (HD2); Listen live (HD3)
- Website: classicrock1069.fm; x1001.fm (HD2); bhammountainradio.com (HD3)

WBPT (106.9 FM, "Classic Rock 106.9") is a commercial radio station licensed to Homewood, Alabama, United States, and serving Greater Birmingham and Central Alabama. It airs a classic rock format and is owned by SummitMedia, along with six other stations in the cluster. The stations share studios in the Cahaba neighborhood in southeast Birmingham. WBPT also airs University of Alabama Crimson Tide football.

The transmitter is located atop of Red Mountain. WBPT broadcasts using HD Radio technology; the HD2 subchannel plays alternative rock, which feeds FM translator W261BX at 100.1 MHz.

== History ==
=== WBRC-FM ===
The station signed on the air in June 1959 as WBRC-FM, the sister station to WBRC (960 AM). This was the second attempt at an FM station from WBRC. It previously ran an FM station from 1948 to December 3, 1949, at 102.5 MHz, broadcasting with 546,000 watts.

Through the 1960s, WBRC and WBRC-FM simulcast most of the same programming. By 1971, WBRC-FM had its own format. It played Top 40 hits using automation with no disc jockeys. But it was not successful in competing against the AM Top 40 powerhouses 610 WSGN or 690 WVOK. In 1972, both the AM and FM radio stations were sold by Taft Broadcasting to Mooney Broadcasting. As a result, the call signs of the radio stations were changed to WERC and WERC-FM. The AM station dropped its middle of the road (MOR) music format in favor of Top 40. The FM station repeated the AM station's daytime programming, while at night it featured a separate album-oriented rock (AOR) sound.

=== WKXX ===
In 1977, the broadcast facilities of WERC-FM were upgraded, and in July of that year the call sign was changed to WKXX. After several weeks of stunting, WKXX debuted a new format as "Kix 106." On August 5, 1977, it became the only Top 40 station on the FM dial in Birmingham. By this time, more people owned FM radios and the next year, "Kicks 106" had become the top-rated radio station in Birmingham. It dethroned the longstanding ratings leader, WSGN "the Big 610" (now WAGG). The success of "Kicks 106" eventually forced both WSGN and WKXX's own AM sister station, branded "96-ERC", to abandon their Top 40 formats.

Throughout the late 1970s and early 1980s, WKXX was the dominant FM Top 40 station in Birmingham. As late as 1984, "Kicks 106" held the top spot in ratings among Birmingham stations. But in 1985, WAPI-FM (branded "I-95") became the second station in the market to employ the format and surpassed WKXX in the local ratings. In addition, Top 40 stations from Tuscaloosa, 102.5 WDXB, and Gadsden, Alabama, 103.7 WQEN, could be picked up in most of the Birmingham area. By between 1987 and 1988, "Kicks 106" modified its format, playing a hybrid of Top 40 and rhythmic crossover music, positioning itself somewhat between I-95 and urban station WENN. Initially, the altered format was successful. However, in 1989, the station returned to a straight Top 40 format, with a new branding, "X-106". The new format and nickname were not well-received, however, and in 1990, the station reverted to branding itself as "Kicks 106", and returned to the Top 40/rhythmic hybrid.

=== Country, Oldies and Classic Hits ===
In June 1991, WKXX finally abandoned its Top 40 format and became a country music outlet, "Real Country 106.9 WBMH." Some six months later, the call sign was changed to WIKX and the "Kicks 106" name reappeared. (In fact, many of the old Top 40-era "Kicks" jingles were used.) The station retained its country format. But it was less successful playing country music than it had been in the last days as a Top 40 station.

In October 1992, 106.9 took on its next call sign and format, becoming WODL, "Oldies 106.9". The station continued in this format until October 2001, when the oldies format moved from 106.9 to 97.3, which was co-owned by Cox Radio. The WKXX call sign is now used in Gadsden for a classic country station at 102.9 FM.

After the move, "106-9 the Point" debuted, playing an all-1980s music format. The station was assigned the WBPT call letters by the Federal Communications Commission on October 17, 2001. The B stands for Birmingham and the PT stood for "The Point". The station was usually ranked low in the Birmingham Arbitron ratings.

In October 2005, WBPT added a broader rotation of rock classic hits. It began using the branding "106.9 the Eagle". WBPT played hits from the 1970s through the 1990s from artists generally associated with rock music as opposed to pop and dance.

=== Classic Rock ===
In mid-2014, the station adjusted its format from classic hits to classic rock. On December 20, 2022, WBPT rebranded as "Classic Rock 106.9". "The Eagle" moniker was dropped. The new slogan was "The Only Classic Rock Station". Much of the playlist kept the "Rock Hits of the 1970s-1990s" repertoire previously heard on the station with some new harder rock titles.

On July 20, 2012, Cox Radio announced the sale of WBPT and 22 other stations to SummitMedia LLC for $66.25 million. The sale was consummated on May 3, 2013.

== WBPT-HD2 ==
On January 15, 2024, WBPT launched an alternative rock format on its HD2 digital subchannel. It is branded as "X100.1" and is simulcast on FM translator W261BX at 100.1 FM in Birmingham.

== WBPT-HD3 ==
On July 11, 2025, the "Birmingham Mountain Radio" adult album alternative format moved from WPYA's HD2 subchannel to WBPT's HD3 subchannel.
