= WJRD =

Radio station in Tuscaloosa, Alabama

- Tuscaloosa, Alabama; United States
- Broadcast area: Tuscaloosa and vicinity
- Frequency: 1150 kHz
- Branding: 1150 AM, 102.1 FM WJRD

Programming
- Format: Oldies
- Affiliations: Westwood One

Ownership
- Owner: JRD, Inc.

History
- First air date: 1936
- Former call signs: WJRD (1936–1987); WZBQ (1987–1992); WSPZ (1992–2004)
- Former frequencies: 1200 kHz (1936–1941); 1230 kHz (1941–1948)
- Call sign meaning: James R. Doss, Jr.

Technical information
- Licensing authority: FCC
- Facility ID: 24384
- Class: B
- Power: 20,000 watts (day); 1,000 watts (night)
- Transmitter coordinates: 33°14′58″N 87°36′31″W
- Translators: 102.1 W271AM (Tuscaloosa); 103.1 W276DP (Tuscaloosa)

Links
- Public license information: Public file; LMS
- Website: wjrdradio.com

WJRD (1150 AM) is a radio station licensed to serve Tuscaloosa, Alabama, United States. The station is owned by JRD, Inc. WJRD simulcasts on FM translators W271AM (102.1 FM) and W276DP (103.1 FM) in Tuscaloosa.

It broadcasts an oldies music format to the Tuscaloosa metropolitan area as an affiliate of Good Time Oldies, a satellite-fed radio format from Westwood One.

== History ==
=== The beginning ===
WJRD began broadcasting in 1936 at 1200 kHz, running 100 watts of power during daytime hours only. The station was originally owned by James R. Doss, Jr., and he used his own initials when choosing call letters. (His brother, James Lyndon Doss, would do the same in 1942 when they jointly put WJLD on the air in Birmingham, Alabama.) In 1937, the station's power was increased to 250 watts. The station was granted permission to operate at night, running 100 watts, to broadcast political speeches, sporting events, and other special occasions. In 1940, the station began regular nighttime operations, running 100 watts. In 1941, the station's frequency was changed to 1230 kHz, as a result of the North American Regional Broadcasting Agreement.

In 1948, the station's frequency was changed to 1150 kHz frequency and its power was increased to 5,000 watts during the day and a 1,000 watts at night. In 1949, James Doss died, and control of the station passed to Wilhelmina Doss. Through the 1950s and early 1960s, the station aired a full-service mix of news and easy listening music.

In 1959, WJRD general manager John C. Cooper Jr. was elected president of the Alabama Broadcasters Association.

In December 1969, James W. Harris reached an agreement to transfer control of WJRD's license holder, Cooper Radio Inc., to Druid City Broadcasters Inc. in exchange for stock in Druid City Broadcasters and an employment agreement with Cooper Radio.

In December 1983, Dr. Charles B. Crow and Maureen Crow made a deal to transfer control of GMC Broadcasting, Inc., the licensee of this station, to William A. Grant, Jr. The transfer was approved by the FCC on January 9, 1984, and the transaction was consummated on March 9, 1984.

=== End of an era ===
On February 27, 1987, the station abandoned its heritage callsign of more than 50 years to become WZBQ. The switch was made to help brand the station's new contemporary hit radio format, that it was simulcasting from its new FM sister station WZBQ-FM whose studios had just moved to the Tuscaloosa market from Jasper, Alabama.

Prior to the move to the Tuscaloosa market, with the physical studios being located at the transmitter site of the now WZBQ in the city of Northport, on Flatwoods Road, just off of Alabama Highways 13/43 North, behind The Northport Civic Center, that is located on U.S. Highway 82/McFarland Blvd. in the city of Northport, Alabama, WZBQ-FM, like WZBQ, had been programming a country music format. Additionally, WZBQ-FM had used the call letters WWWB-FM.

With this move, both stations, along with another AM radio station that remained in Jasper, Alabama, WWWB later changing its call letters to WZPQ (these call letters were chosen to show their connection to; WZBQ and WZBQ-FM) were all owned by Sis Sound, Inc.

Sis Sound, Inc. was a corporation based in Jasper, Alabama, and whose stock holders were the descendants of Walter Will Bankhead (July 21, 1897 – November 24, 1988) whose radio empire started with; WWWB in Jasper. In fact, this early days "radio empire" of stations, even reflected Bankhead's name in the call letters of his stations, with the early stations, having his initials; Walter Will Bankhead for WWWB. Subsequent stations he owned had his initials too. Examples of these are; WWWF in Fayette, Alabama, or Walter Will's Fayette and WWWR Russellville, Alabama or Walter Will's Russellville. This empire of stations, was decades before, ended with the family owning the maximum number of radio stations allowed by the FCC at the time.

In June 1992, while still owned by Sis Sound, Inc., the station switched call signs again, this time to WSPZ to match its new satellite-based sports talk format. WSPZ aired a mix of sports talk programs, call-in shows, and sporting events including Atlanta Falcons football games. While the majority of the station's sports programming was provided by a satellite based sports programming service, the station did broadcast some very limited local sports programs (i.e. high school football) plus regional college sports programs.

In July 1997, GMC Broadcasting, Inc., agreed to sell this station to Birmingham Christian Radio, Inc. The deal was approved by the FCC on October 16, 1997, and the transaction was consummated on December 31, 1997. The new owners flipped the format to black gospel.

In January 2002, Birmingham Christian Radio, Inc., reached an agreement to sell this station to Radio South, Inc., (Houston L. Pearce, sole shareholder) for a reported sale price of $150,000. After several amendments to the application and the station falling silent for almost a year, the deal was finally approved by the FCC on April 11, 2003, and the transaction was consummated on April 24, 2003.

=== WJRD reborn ===
In mid-June 2003, the station came back on the air with an adult standards music format branded as "Timeless Classics". By the time Pearce filed for the renewal of WJRD's broadcast license in March 2004, the name of the company had been changed to Apex Broadcasting, Inc. On October 15, 2004, the station dropped the WSPZ callsign for its heritage WJRD call letters.

In February 2005, Apex Broadcasting Inc. (Houston L. Pearce, chairman) reached an agreement to be acquired by Citadel Broadcasting (Farid Suleman, chairman/CEO). In the deal Citadel acquired WJRD and five other radio stations in Alabama for a reported sale price of $29 million. Citadel, already operating WJRD under a local marketing agreement, continued the adult standards music format under the "Timeless Favorites 1150" branding. In June 2005, the station became a simulcast of country music sister station WFFN ("95.3 The Bear").

On February 6, 2006, music programming was dropped as WJRD became "1150, The People's Station" with a mix of talk radio programming aimed at an African American audience. Part of Citadel's then-new "Black Talk Network", WJRD aired shows hosted by "Fly Jock" Tom Joyner, activist Reverend Al Sharpton, Michael Eric Dyson, plus sports talk from the "Two Live Stews".

The change to talk would prove short lived as it was dropped in September 2007 when Citadel Broadcasting (Farid Suleman, chairman/CEO) reached an agreement to transfer the license for WJRD to JRD, Inc. (James Shaw, president) for a reported sale price of $200,000. The station moved back to adult standards music and the "Timeless Classics" branding at the end of September 2007. The FCC finally approved the deal on November 2, 2007, and the transaction was consummated on November 19, 2007.

Just like original owner James R. Doss, the station's current owners (JRD, Inc., shareholders James E. Shaw, Ronald B. Price, and David M. Baughn) share initials with this station's call sign.

== Programming ==
In December 2008, the station dropped its "Timeless Classics" branding and adult standards music format in favor of "The True Oldies Channel" branding and a satellite-fed oldies music format. Until the shift, this programming was aired on WDGM (99.1 FM) which now airs a sports talk format branded as "Tide 99.1".

== Translators ==
Broadcast translators for WJRD
Call sign	Frequency	City of license	FID	ERP (W)	Class	FCC info
W271AM	102.1 FM	Tuscaloosa, Alabama	148570	99	D	LMS
W276DP	103.1 FM	Tuscaloosa, Alabama	202518	50	D	LMS
