= SummitMedia =

American radio broadcasting company

SummitMedia, LLC

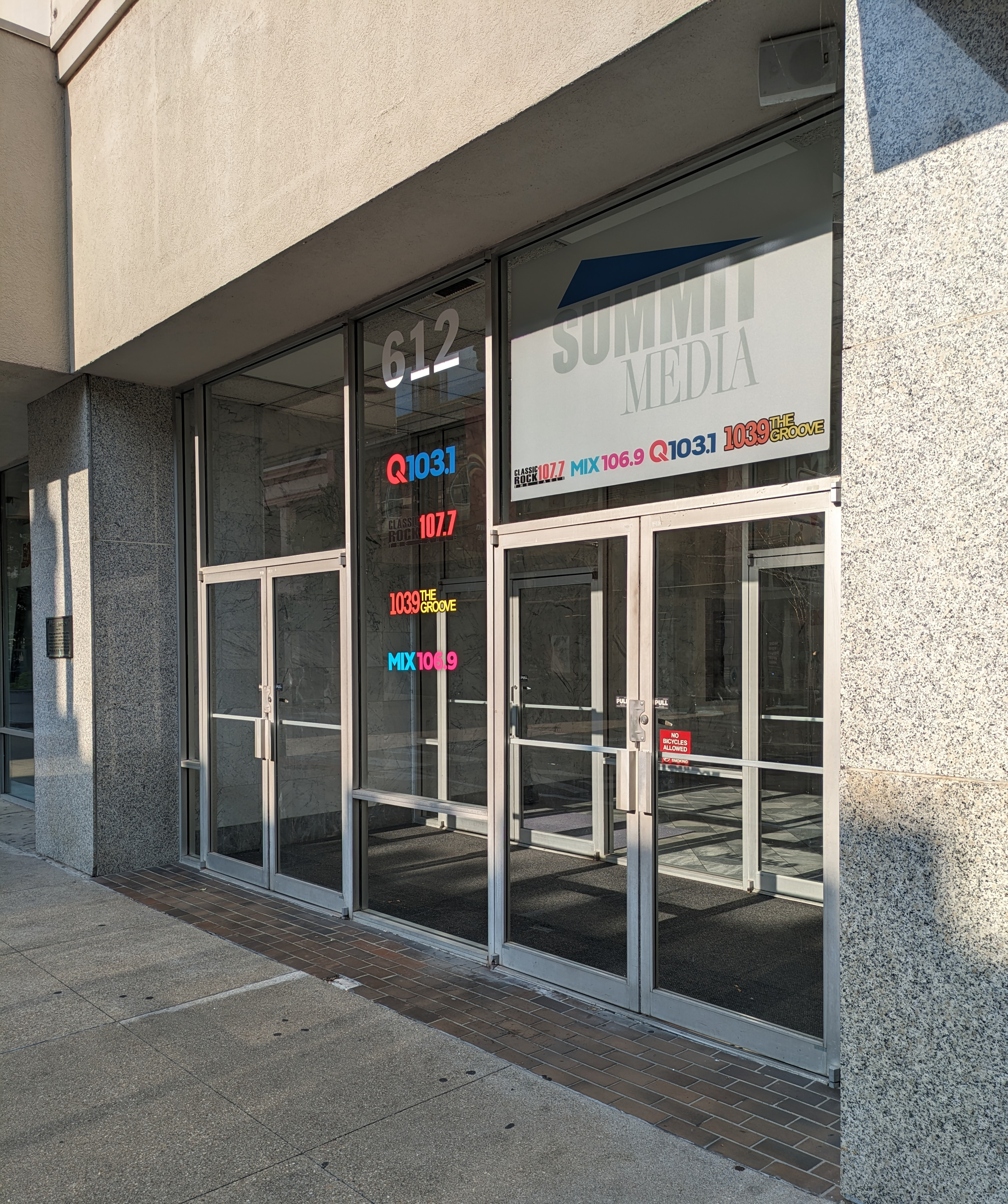
- Louisville, Kentucky office
- Type: Private
- Industry: Media
- Founded: 2013; 13 years ago
- Headquarters: Birmingham, Alabama
- Products: Radio stations
- Website: summitmediacorp.com

SummitMedia, LLC is an American radio broadcasting company based in Birmingham, Alabama. The company formed to purchase mid-market radio stations being divested by Cox Radio in 2013.

On November 1, 2018, SummitMedia acquired 19 stations in four markets from the E. W. Scripps Company.

== Stations ==
Call sign	Frequency	City of license	Market
WAGG	610 AM	Birmingham, AL	Birmingham, AL
WBHJ	95.7 FM	Midfield, AL	Birmingham, AL
WBHK	98.7 FM	Warrior, AL	Birmingham, AL
WBPT	106.9 FM	Homewood, AL	Birmingham, AL
WENN	1320 AM	Birmingham, AL	Birmingham, AL
WPYA	97.3 FM	Gardendale, AL	Birmingham, AL
WZZK-FM	104.7 FM	Birmingham, AL	Birmingham, AL
KFDI-FM	101.3 FM	Wichita, KS	Wichita, KS
KFXJ	104.5 FM	Augusta, KS	Wichita, KS
KICT-FM	95.1 FM	Wichita, KS	Wichita, KS
KYQQ	106.5 FM	Arkansas City, KS	Wichita, KS
WRKA	103.9 FM	Louisville, KY	Louisville, KY
WSFR	107.7 FM	Corydon, IN	Louisville, KY
WQNU	103.1 FM	Lyndon, KY	Louisville, KY
WVEZ	106.9 FM	St. Matthews, KY	Louisville, KY
KRVI	106.7 FM	Mount Vernon, MO	Springfield, MO
KSGF	1260 AM	Springfield, MO	Springfield, MO
KSGF-FM	104.1 FM	Ash Grove, MO	Springfield, MO
KSPW	96.5 FM	Sparta, MO	Springfield, MO
KTTS-FM	94.7 FM	Springfield, MO	Springfield, MO
KEZO-FM	92.3 FM	Omaha, NE	Omaha, NE
KKCD	105.9 FM	Omaha, NE	Omaha, NE
KQCH	94.1 FM	Omaha, NE	Omaha, NE
KSRZ	104.5 FM	Omaha, NE	Omaha, NE
WHZT	98.1 FM	Williamston, SC	Greenville, SC
WJMZ-FM	107.3 FM	Anderson, SC	Greenville, SC
WCYQ	100.3 FM	Oak Ridge, TN	Knoxville, TN
WKHT	104.5 FM	Knoxville, TN	Knoxville, TN
WNOX	93.1 FM	Karns, TN	Knoxville, TN
WWST	102.1 FM	Sevierville, TN	Knoxville, TN
WJSR	100.9 FM	Lakeside, VA	Richmond, VA
WKHK	95.3 FM	Colonial Heights, VA	Richmond, VA
WKLR	96.5 FM	Fort Gregg-Adams, VA	Richmond, VA
WURV	103.7 FM	Richmond, VA	Richmond, VA
KCCN-FM	100.3 FM	Honolulu, HI	Honolulu, HI
KINE-FM	105.1 FM	Honolulu, HI	Honolulu, HI
KRTR-FM	96.3 FM	Kailua, HI	Honolulu, HI
KPHW	104.3 FM	Kaneohe, HI	Honolulu, HI
