= WENN (AM) =

- Birmingham, Alabama; United States
- Broadcast area: Greater Birmingham
- Frequency: 1320 kHz
- Branding: Star 92

Programming
- Format: Classic hits

Ownership
- Owner: SummitMedia; (SM-WENN, LLC)
- Sister stations: WAGG, WBHJ, WBHK, WBPT, WZZK-FM

History
- First air date: 1950 (as WEZB)
- Former call signs: WEZB (1950–1959); WENN (1959–1983); WAGG (1983–1999); WEZN (1999–2000); WRJS (2000–2003); WZZK (2003–2006); WPSB (2006–2009)

Technical information
- Licensing authority: FCC
- Facility ID: 6411
- Class: D
- Power: 5,000 watts (day); 111 watts (night)
- Transmitter coordinates: 33°33′41″N 86°51′37″W
- Translator: 92.5 W223DO (Chelsea)
- Repeater: 98.7 WBHK-HD2 (Warrior)

Links
- Public license information: Public file; LMS
- Webcast: Listen Live
- Website: star92fm.com

WENN (1320 kHz) is a commercial AM radio station licensed to Birmingham, Alabama. It airs a classic hits format and is owned by SummitMedia, which also owns six other Birmingham stations, and all share studios and offices in the Cahaba neighborhood in southeast Birmingham, but is not related to the fictional radio WENN in the American Movie Classics sitcom Remember WENN, which ran from 1996 to 1998.

By day, WENN broadcasts at 5,000 watts. To avoid interfering with other stations on 1320 AM, it reduces power to 111 watts at night. The transmitter is in Hopper City on the city's northside.

== History ==
=== WEZB, WENN and WAGG ===
The station that now broadcasts at 1320 AM in Birmingham started in 1950 as WEZB, an easy listening music station licensed to Homewood, Alabama. When WEZB changed frequencies, moving to 1220 AM in 1959, it was replaced by WENN, playing R&B and black gospel music that targeted Birmingham's African-American community. During the turbulent 1960s, the new WENN was one of two stations that served black listeners; the other was WJLD. Because of FCC restrictions, WENN was a daytimer, broadcasting only from sunrise until sunset. Still, it enjoyed dominance over its main rival, WJLD. In 1969, WENN launched an FM companion station on 107.7 FM. The new WENN-FM was the first FM station in Birmingham aimed at the listening tastes of the community's African-American population.

The popularity of FM radio in Birmingham greatly increased during the late 1970s and early 1980s. WENN-FM's audience growth in particular led the station management to seek a separate identity for the AM 1320. In 1983, the AM station changed its call sign to WAGG, and it became an urban gospel music station. This change in programming proved to be successful, and by the end of the 1980s, WAGG was one of the highest-rated AM stations in Birmingham.

=== Cox Radio ===
In 1998, Cox Radio, which already owned WZZK-FM, WODL-FM and WEZN, bought WAGG. One year later, WEZN, at the time an adult standards-formatted station, and WAGG swapped dial positions in order for WAGG to take advantage of the superior nighttime signal on 610 AM. As a result, 610 would be the new station for gospel music, while 1320 would be the new home for adult standards.

After WAGG and WEZN swapped dial positions, the 1320 AM frequency has changed both its call sign and its programming format several times. In 2000, the adult standards programming was dropped, and the station was relaunched as WRJS ("Rejoice 1320"), another urban gospel station. In 2002, the station changed formats again, becoming a regional Mexican music station known on the air as "La Favorita." In 2003, the station was reincarnated as WZZK (the call sign of 610 AM from 1985–1998), playing classic country music.

=== Urban Talk and Regional Mexican ===
The station became WPSB in February 2006, with an urban talk format under the moniker "The People's Station of Birmingham."

On January 29, 2007, the station began stunting with a loop of "Oye Como Va" by Santana. On February 1, the station was officially relaunched as a Regional Mexican music station branded as "Radio Centro Birmingham". The station was run out of Cox Radio's Birmingham facilities but was operated under a local marketing agreement by KPI Latino.

On March 15, 2009, the legacy WENN call sign was returned to this station. At about the same time, the station dropped the Regional Mexican music format and reverted to urban-oriented talk programming.

=== Urban AC ===
On February 16, 2010, WENN changed its format to neo soul/urban AC, branded as "WENN 101.9, Birmingham's Neo Soul Station", with AM 1320 simulcasting on W270BW (101.9 FM). After approved modifications, W270BW now broadcasts at 102.1 FM (as W271BN), and could be received over most of downtown Birmingham.

On December 12, 2011, WENN/W271BN flipped to old-school hip-hop and R&B, branded as "Power 102.1." It carried the syndicated Birmingham native comedian Rickey Smiley in morning drive.

=== Sports radio ===
On August 30, 2012, WENN changed formats again. The old-school music previously played on 1320 AM moved to WZNN-HD2, and WENN became a sports radio station as a full-time network affiliate of ESPN Radio. At the same time, the station's programming began simulcasting on a new FM translator, W297BF (107.3 FM).

On July 20, 2012, Cox Radio, Inc. announced the sale of WENN and 22 other stations to Summit Media LLC for $66.25 million. The sale was consummated on May 3, 2013.

=== Summit Media ownership ===
On July 2, 2013, Summit Media announced a format change for 107.3 FM/97.3 HD-2. At Noon that day, the frequency became the over-the-air station for Birmingham Mountain Radio, a formerly internet-only radio station that had been receiving accolades in the market since its inception in 2010. On that same day, WENN reverted to their simulcast of W271BN.

On November 15, 2013, WENN and W271BN changed the format to adult hits, simulcasting WZNN, branded as "102.1 Y'all FM". The simulcast lasted until November 21, 2013, at midnight; at that time, the former WZNN became soft adult contemporary WEZZ, "Easy 97.3".

=== Going silent, subsequent formats ===
On October 3, 2014, WENN went silent, with W271BN switching to a simulcast of gospel-formatted sister station WAGG.

In November 2014, WENN returned to the air, simulcasting WEZZ-FM's soft adult contemporary format.

In April 2015, WENN changed its format back to adult hits. The following month, WENN went silent, though it would later be reported to come back on air the following month with the same adult hits format, and would begin simulcasting on new FM translator W261BX (100.1 FM).

On September 25, 2015, WENN/W261BX began stunting with Christmas music, becoming the first station to change over for the season. The station was not selling any commercials during the stunt.

On December 28, 2015, WENN changed its format to hot adult contemporary, branded as "All the Hits 100.1".

On March 14, 2016, WENN changed their format to soft AC, branded as "Easy 102.1", and switched translators to W271BN (102.1 FM).

After the sale of its translator to the Educational Media Foundation, WENN went dark in April 2017.

On May 4, 2017, WENN returned to the air with soft AC, branded as "Easy 1320".

In July 2017, WENN switched to a simulcast of urban adult contemporary-formatted WBHK. That simulcast gave way back to a simulcast of WAGG sometime later.

On November 23, 2024, WENN returned to the air with a beautiful music format, branded as "Beautiful 1320".

On October 1, 2025, WENN changed their format from beautiful music to classic hits, branded as "Star 92", targeting Shelby County.
