= Don Logan =

American media executive (born 1944)

- Occupation: Media Executive
- Known for: Chairman/CEO of Time Inc., Time Warner Cable, Southern Progress Corporation; Owner, Birmingham Barons
- Spouse: Sandra Logan
- Children: 2

Don Logan (born 1944) is an American media executive from Hartselle, Alabama who lives in Birmingham. A retired Time Warner media chairman, Logan owned the Birmingham Barons minor-league baseball team until 2023. In May 2011, he was inducted into the Alabama Sports Hall of Fame.

In 2010, he led an ownership group to purchase the Bass Anglers Sportsman Society from ESPN. In late 2011, they relocated B.A.S.S. headquarters from Celebration, Florida, to Birmingham.

== Education ==
Pursuing a degree in mathematics, Logan graduated magna cum laude from Auburn University in 1966. He also holds a master's degree in mathematics from Clemson University and has been awarded honorary doctorates from Auburn University (1997), Clemson University and University of Alabama at Birmingham (1997).

== Work ==
While a co-op student at Auburn University, Logan alternated between school and working at the National Aeronautics and Space Administration outpost in Huntsville, Alabama, writing computer programs. Upon graduating, Logan did a brief stint with Shell Oil’s research division, leaving in 1970 to take a job as a data processing manager for Progressive Farmer (later renamed Southern Progress Corporation).

=== Southern Progress Corporation ===
After working in data processing for two years, Logan was promoted to vice president and general manager of Akra Data, the computer division. He then went on to be named president of the book publishing division of SPC, Oxmoor House, in 1978, and in 1984 became executive vice president of the company. In 1986, Time Inc. acquired the company, and Logan was promoted to chairman and chief executive officer of SPC. He was CEO when the author Harry Middleton worked there. The largest regional magazine and book publishing company in the country, SPC publishes Southern Living, Cooking Light, Health and Coastal Living magazines and Oxmoor House books, and it is a wholly owned subsidiary of Time Inc.

=== Time Inc. ===
Six years after Logan’s promotion to CEO at SPC, he moved to New York to serve as president and chief operating officer of Time Inc. In August 1994, two years after moving to New York to work with Time Inc., Logan was named chief executive officer, later taking on the additional title of chairman in July 1997. Under his direction, Time Inc. experienced 11 straight years of earnings growth. In 2002, Logan became chairman of AOL Time Warner's Media and Communications Group, overseeing America Online, Time Inc., Time Warner Cable, the AOL Time Warner Book Group and Interactive Video Unit. He retired from Time Warner in 2005.
