= WAPI (AM) =

Currently silent
- Birmingham, Alabama; United States
- Broadcast area: Central Alabama
- Frequency: 1070 kHz

Ownership
- Owner: Cumulus Media; (Radio License Holding CBC, LLC)
- Sister stations: WJOX; WJOX-FM; WJQX; WUHT; WZRR

History
- First air date: October 3, 1922
- Former call signs: WMAV (1922–1924); WSY (1924–1925)
- Call sign meaning: Alabama Polytechnic Institute

Technical information
- Licensing authority: FCC
- Facility ID: 16900
- Class: B
- Power: 50,000 watts (day); 5,000 watts (night)
- Transmitter coordinates: 33°33′7.4″N 86°54′40″W

Links
- Public license information: Public file; LMS

WAPI (1070 AM) is a commercial radio station licensed to Birmingham, Alabama, United States, that is currently silent. It is owned by Cumulus Media, with studios on Goodwin Crest Drive in Homewood and a transmitter in Forestdale. Prior to going silent in March 2025, WAPI simulcast the conservative talk format of co-owned WZRR. WAPI also broadcast in HD Radio.

== History ==
=== WMAV and WSY ===
The Department of Commerce regulated radio stations in the United States from 1912 until the 1927 formation of the Federal Radio Commission (FRC). Originally there were no restrictions on which radio stations could make broadcasts intended for the general public. However, effective December 1, 1921, a regulation was adopted limiting broadcasting to stations operating under a Limited Commercial license that authorized operation on designated wavelengths of 360 meters (833 kHz) for "entertainment", and 485 meters (619 kHz) for "market and weather reports".

The station was first licensed, as WMAV, on October 3, 1922, to the Alabama Polytechnic Institute (API) in Auburn (now Auburn University), for operation on both wavelengths. The call sign was randomly assigned from a sequential list. WMAV was the fourth broadcasting station licensed in Alabama.

Separately, in Birmingham, the Alabama Power Company was issued a license for WSY on March 29, 1922; it was the state's second radio station. This call sign was also randomly assigned, but were used by the station as the basis for the slogan "We Serve You". Alabama Power decided to exit the radio business, and WSY was deleted on October 30, 1924.

WSY's former equipment was donated to API. In November 1924, the call sign for WMAV in Auburn was changed to WSY. The call letters were changed again in August 1925 to WAPI, standing for Alabama Polytechnic Institute.

=== WAPI and NBC ===
On November 11, 1928, with the implementation of the FRC's General Order 40, WAPI was assigned to 1140 kHz, sharing this frequency with KVOO in Tulsa, Oklahoma. In 1928, WAPI returned to Birmingham, in part due to the NBC Red Network's interest in affiliating with a station in Alabama's largest city. In 1929, ownership of the station was split among API, the University of Alabama, and the Alabama College for Women (now the University of Montevallo). The broadcast power was increased to 5,000 watts. In 1932, the colleges sold the station to a group of investors, doing business as "The Voice of Alabama". WAPI remained affiliated with NBC until 1940, when it became an affiliate of CBS Radio.

=== Move to 1070 ===
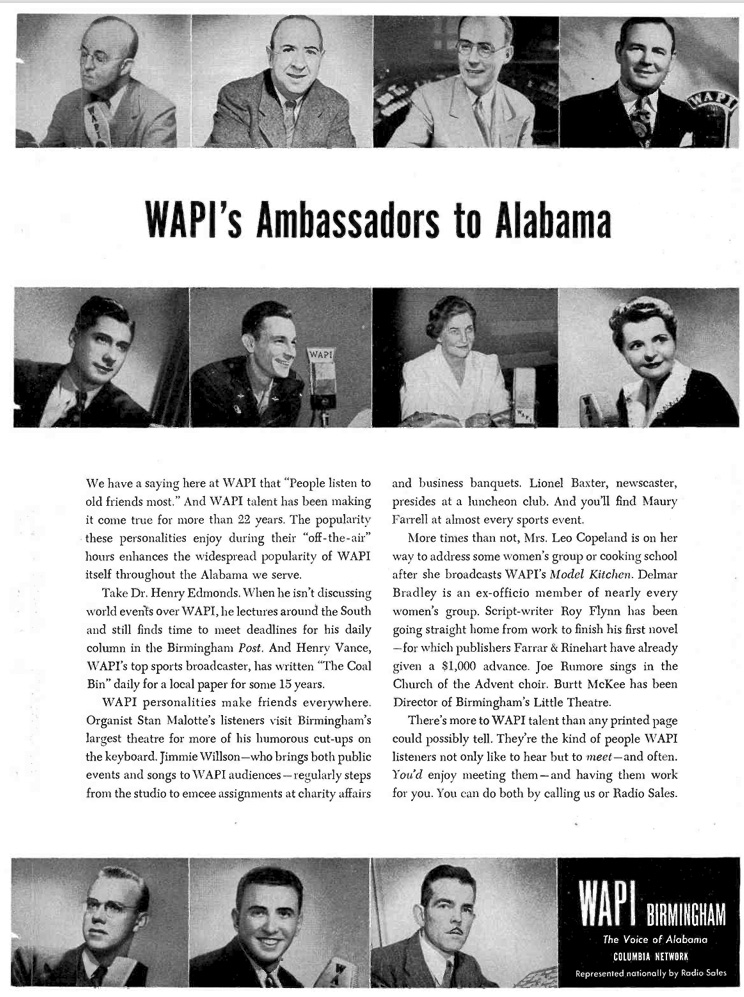
1946 station advertisement.

In March 1941, with the implementation of the North American Regional Broadcasting Agreement, WAPI moved to 1170 kHz. The next year it moved to its present frequency, 1070 kHz. On December 1, 1947, it launched an FM sister station, WAFM. In 1949, WAPI launched the first television station in Alabama, WAFM-TV.

The Birmingham News purchased WAPI and its FM and television sister stations in 1953, switching WAFM-TV's call letters to WABT and changing that station's affiliation to NBC the following year. The Newhouse chain bought The Birmingham News in 1956; two years later, it renamed WAFM and WABT as WAPI-FM and WAPI-TV to match the AM station. Newhouse sold off the broadcast outlets to separate owners in 1980, at which time the TV station acquired its current WVTM-TV call sign. WAPI-FM would eventually become WJOX-FM.

=== Popular music and adult standards ===
In the 1950s, as network radio programming began to lose its importance due to television's popularity, WAPI evolved. It became a full service, middle-of-the-road station of popular music, news and sports, featuring several local call-in shows at night. By the mid-1970s, it was the only Birmingham AM adult contemporary radio station.

In July 1983, WAPI changed to an adult standards format under the branding "Hit Parade". In January 1985, the station returned to its previous adult contemporary format. However, three months later, WAPI immediately returned to adult standards programming when crosstown rival WSGN (now WAGG) dropped that format. On January 1, 1996, WAPI became an all-news radio station. Over time, the station evolved into a mostly talk radio station.

=== AM-FM simulcasts ===
On February 22, 2010, WWMM-FM 100.5 changed its call sign to WAPI-FM and dropped its former adult album alternative music format. The two stations began simulcasting for most of the day, with the FM side branded as the main station, calling itself "100 WAPI". However, on July 24, 2013, WAPI-FM changed its call letters to WJQX and flipped to a sports radio format, carrying ESPN Radio programs, as a sister station to WJOX and WJOX-FM. This left the news/talk format solely on the AM side once again for three years.

On May 23, 2016, co-owned 99.5 WZRR dropped its country music format and began simulcasting talk programs with WAPI. WZRR was quickly branded as the main station: both stations were promoted as "Talk 99.5", with WAPI's existence only acknowledged for legally mandated station identifications.

On March 10, 2025, WAPI went silent. It was one of six Cumulus stations to shut down on the weekend of March 7, as part of a larger silencing of underperforming Cumulus stations. The talk format continues to air on WZRR.

== See also ==
- List of initial AM-band station grants in the United States
