= WUHT =

Coordinates: 33.485°N 86.807°W

- Birmingham, Alabama; United States
- Broadcast area: Birmingham metropolitan area
- Frequency: 107.7 MHz (HD Radio)
- Branding: Hot 107.7

Programming
- Format: Urban Adult Contemporary
- Affiliations: Premiere Networks; Westwood One; University of Alabama at Birmingham Blazers

Ownership
- Owner: Cumulus Media; (Radio License Holding CBC, LLC)
- Sister stations: WAPI, WJOX, WJOX-FM, WJQX, WZRR

History
- First air date: September 15, 1969
- Former call signs: WENN-FM (1969–1998); WRAX (1998–2005)
- Call sign meaning: Contains "HT" for Hot

Technical information
- Licensing authority: FCC
- Facility ID: 6401
- Class: C1
- ERP: 42,000 watts
- HAAT: 409.9 meters (1,345 ft)

Links
- Public license information: Public file; LMS
- Webcast: Listen live Listen live (via iHeartRadio)
- Website: hot1077radio.com

WUHT (107.7 FM, "Hot 107.7") is a commercial radio station licensed to Birmingham, Alabama, and owned by Cumulus Media. It airs an urban adult contemporary format. WUHT also serves as the flagship station of the University of Alabama at Birmingham Blazers Radio Network. WUHT's studios are on Goodwin Crest Drive in Homewood.

WUHT is a Class C1 station. It has an effective radiated power (ERP) of 42,000 watts. Its transmitter is off Golden Crest Drive atop Red Mountain in Birmingham.

== History ==
=== WENN-FM and WRAX ===
The station signed on the air on September 15, 1969. Its call sign was WENN-FM, the sister station to the popular WENN (1320 AM). The two stations simulcast most of their programming. WENN-FM was the first FM station in Birmingham to target African-American listeners, playing what was then called “soul music" a mix of R&B and Motown hits. The station had no FM competition until 1996. When the AM changed formats and call letters in 1983, WENN-FM was well established as Birmingham’s leading station for what is now called urban contemporary music.

In 1998, new owners of the 107.7 frequency moved the programming and call letters of WENN to 105.9 FM and moved the alternative rock format and WRAX call letters to 107.7. Known on the air as "107.7 the X", WRAX became one of the highest rated alternative/modern rock stations in the country. It was successful, even though its signal was limited. It broadcast from a tower atop Miles Mountain in Palmerdale, Alabama, some 15 miles (24 km) northeast of downtown Birmingham. The majority of Birmingham’s other FM stations broadcast from Red Mountain, which overlooks the city.

=== WUHT ===
In 2005, Citadel Broadcasting purchased several stations in nearby Tuscaloosa, including alternative music WANZ, whose signal reached Birmingham. Not wanting to own two stations with the same format in the same market, the WRAX call letters were moved to 100.5 FM. On March 31, 2005, "The X" changed frequencies again, moving to 100.5 and becoming known on the air as "The X @ 100.5". On the same day, WUHT "Hot 107.7" debuted, branding itself as "Birmingham’s New #1 for R & B Hits". The station now broadcasts at slightly reduced power from an antenna atop Birmingham’s Red Mountain. Its musical presentation places it squarely between Summit Media's stations, urban contemporary WBHJ (95.7 Jamz) and adult urban WBHK (98.7 Kiss FM).

Citadel merged with Cumulus Media on September 16, 2011. In 2024, Cumulus Media made some company-wide cuts that included WUHT. Program Director and midday host Tasha Simone was let go.
