= WBHK =

Coordinates: 33.485°N 86.807°W

- Warrior, Alabama; United States
- Broadcast area: Birmingham, Alabama
- Frequency: 98.7 MHz (HD Radio)
- Branding: 98.7 Kiss FM

Programming
- Format: Urban adult contemporary
- Subchannels: HD2: WENN simulcast

Ownership
- Owner: SummitMedia; (SM-WBHK, LLC)
- Sister stations: WAGG, WBHJ, WBPT, WENN, WZZK-FM

History
- First air date: April 22, 1992
- Former call signs: WLBI (1991–1996)
- Call sign meaning: Birmingham Kiss

Technical information
- Licensing authority: FCC
- Facility ID: 65227
- Class: C1
- ERP: 39,000 watts
- HAAT: 408 meters (1,339 ft)

Links
- Public license information: Public file; LMS
- Webcast: Listen live
- Website: 987kiss.com

WBHK (98.7 FM, "98.7 Kiss-FM") is a commercial radio station licensed to Warrior, Alabama, and serves Greater Birmingham. Owned by SummitMedia, it airs an urban adult contemporary format, with studios located in the Cahaba neighborhood in far southeast Birmingham.

WBHK's transmitter is sited on Golden Crest Drive atop Red Mountain. The signal can be heard across most of Northern and Central Alabama. In 2005, WBHK began broadcasting in HD Radio.

== History ==
=== Hot AC and Smooth Jazz ===
While the station was still a construction permit, it was assigned the WLBI call letters by the Federal Communications Commission on December 13, 1991. After it was built, it signed on the air on April 22, 1992. It was known as "The Great 98" and was powered at 6,000 watts, a fraction of its current output. It had a hot adult contemporary format but was a rimshot station, 15 miles (24 km) north of Birmingham. Its tower was on a hill off Arkadelphia Road, west of Warrior, with studios set up in a trailer. The station was built by Terry Bentley Lowery and Danny Bentley, both with broadcasting interests in Oneonta, Alabama.

In 1994, the station became known as "98 Lite", and changed to a soft adult contemporary format. In 1995, WLBI began adding smooth jazz programming and eventually morphed into a fulltime smooth jazz station. It continued to broadcast as "98 Lite".

=== Urban AC ===
On July 24, 1996, after years of struggling in the ratings, it segued to Urban AC music. It began using the slogan, "98.7 Kiss-FM, Smooth R&B and Classic Soul". It switched call letters, becoming WBHK on July 1, 1996. The letters represent "Birmingham's Kiss."

With the format change, the ratings increased. In 2002, the transmitter was upgraded and moved up to Red Mountain after many years of broadcasting from a shorter tower. It was acquired by Atlanta-based Cox Radio in the early 2000s.

On July 20, 2012, Cox Radio announced the sale of WBHK and 22 other stations to Summit Media LLC for $66.25 million. The sale was consummated on May 3, 2013.
