= Paul Finebaum =

American sports journalist (born 1955)

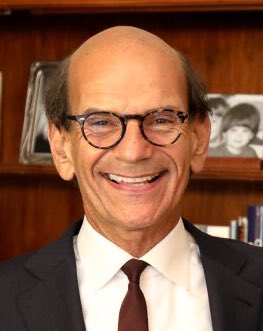
- Finebaum in June 2018
- Born: Paul Alan Finebaum; July 26, 1955 (age 71); Memphis, Tennessee, U.S.
- Education: University of Tennessee (BA)
- Occupations: Sportscaster; sports author; TV/radio personality; sports columnist
- Years active: 1978–present
- Notable credit(s): SportsCenter; SEC Network, Pardon My Take, The Paul Finebaum Radio Network
- Political party: Republican
- Spouse: Linda Hudson (m. 1990)

Paul Finebaum (born July 26, 1955) is an American sports author, former columnist, and television-radio personality. His primary focus is sports in the Southeast United States. After Finebaum spent many years as a reporter, columnist, and sports talk radio host in the Birmingham, Alabama, area, ESPN hired him in 2013 as a personality on the new SEC Network. Finebaum produces a radio show out of the network's regional base in Charlotte, North Carolina.

== Early life ==
Finebaum was born in Memphis, Tennessee. He is Jewish. Finebaum attended Christian Brothers High School and White Station High School in Memphis before graduating from the University of Tennessee, where he received a degree in political science in 1978.

== Career ==
=== News reporter career ===
Finebaum became a columnist and reporter for the Birmingham Post-Herald in 1980. Finebaum earned more than 250 national, regional, and area sports writing awards, including an award for his Alabama basketball player Buck Johnson recruitment stories. In 1993, he wrote the story of Antonio Langham, a University of Alabama football player who signed a contract with a sports agent while playing for the school, which led to an NCAA probation for the school. Finebaum joined the Mobile Press Register in 2001, where he wrote a twice-weekly (later weekly) column that was syndicated to other newspapers. Finebaum discontinued the column in December 2010. On September 1, Finebaum returned to writing with his first column for Sports Illustrated.

=== Radio career ===
Finebaum started his radio appearances in the mid-1980s by giving morning commentary on the Mark and Brian Radio Show on WAPI-FM (I-95). He later started his own afternoon radio show on WAPI-AM, which became the highest-rated sports talk show in Birmingham. In October 1993, Finebaum moved his sport talk show to WERC.

==== The Paul Finebaum Radio Network ====
In 2001, Finebaum, along with Network Director Pat Smith and Producer Johnny Brock, launched The Paul Finebaum Radio Network, syndicated with affiliates across the southeast. It was named in 2004 by Sports Illustrated as one of the top 12 sports radio shows in the United States. In January 2007, his radio show moved to WJOX.

In 2010, the Alabama Crimson Tide was defeated by their rivals the Auburn Tigers in the Iron Bowl. Alabama entered the game as the reigning national champions game with a 10-2 record and ranked 9 in the country, whereas Auburn entered undefeated ranked 2. Despite Auburn's better record, Alabama was largely favored to win the game. In response to this loss, a caller to the Paul Finebaum Show who called himself "Al from Dadeville" on air stated that he poisoned the famous trees at Toomer's Corner on the campus of Auburn University. "Al from Dadeville" was later identified as Harvey Updyke, a lifelong Alabama fan. Finebaum's role in the controversy led him to be featured on NBC Nightly News with Brian Williams and appeared on CNN, ESPN, MSNBC, and several other networks.

Finebaum's show went off the air temporarily on WJOX on January 21, 2013, when his contract with Cumulus and WJOX expired. The New Yorker reported he "had talks with ESPN and CBS, about joining their national radio networks, and with SiriusXM, about moving permanently to satellite." In May 2013, Finebaum signed with ESPN to appear on its new SEC Network beginning in 2014 and also host a daily radio show based out of Charlotte.

=== Television ===
Finebaum appeared as a sports analyst for WBRC in Birmingham. He was sports director for WIAT-TV from 1998 to 2002 and co-hosted individual shows on WVTM-TV and WBMA. Finebaum also had a leading role in ESPN's documentary Roll Tide/War Eagle. The producers used Finebaum and his program as the voice of the documentary, which debuted on November 8, 2011.

As part of the deal Finebaum signed with ESPN in May 2013, he agreed to appear on its new SEC Network starting in 2014, hosting The Paul Finebaum Show in simulcast for ESPN Radio. As an extension of the radio show, he has also hosted special broadcasts on SEC Network as part of ESPN Megacasts involving SEC teams—the Finebaum Film Room—particularly during College Football Playoff National Championship games.

== Publications ==
Finebaum's books include his popular "I Hate..." series, including I Hate Michigan: 303 Reasons Why You Should, Too, and other similarly titled works. His other books include The Worst of Paul Finebaum, a 1994 compilation of some of the newspaper columns he has written, and Finebaum Said, a 2001 collection of columns and interviews.

On March 27, 2013, The Birmingham News reported that Finebaum had agreed to an advance (later reported to be $650,000) with HarperCollins to write a book about the radio show. HarperCollins Senior Vice President and Executive Editor David Hirshey said, "We expect this book to occupy the same spot on the best-seller list that Alabama occupies in the BCS rankings – number one." In February, Publishers Weekly reported that the book would arrive on August 5 with a first run of 150,000 copies. The book, which was excerpted in the Wall Street Journal on the same day, made The New York Times best-seller list for five months, once landing at No. 6 among sports books.

== Reception ==
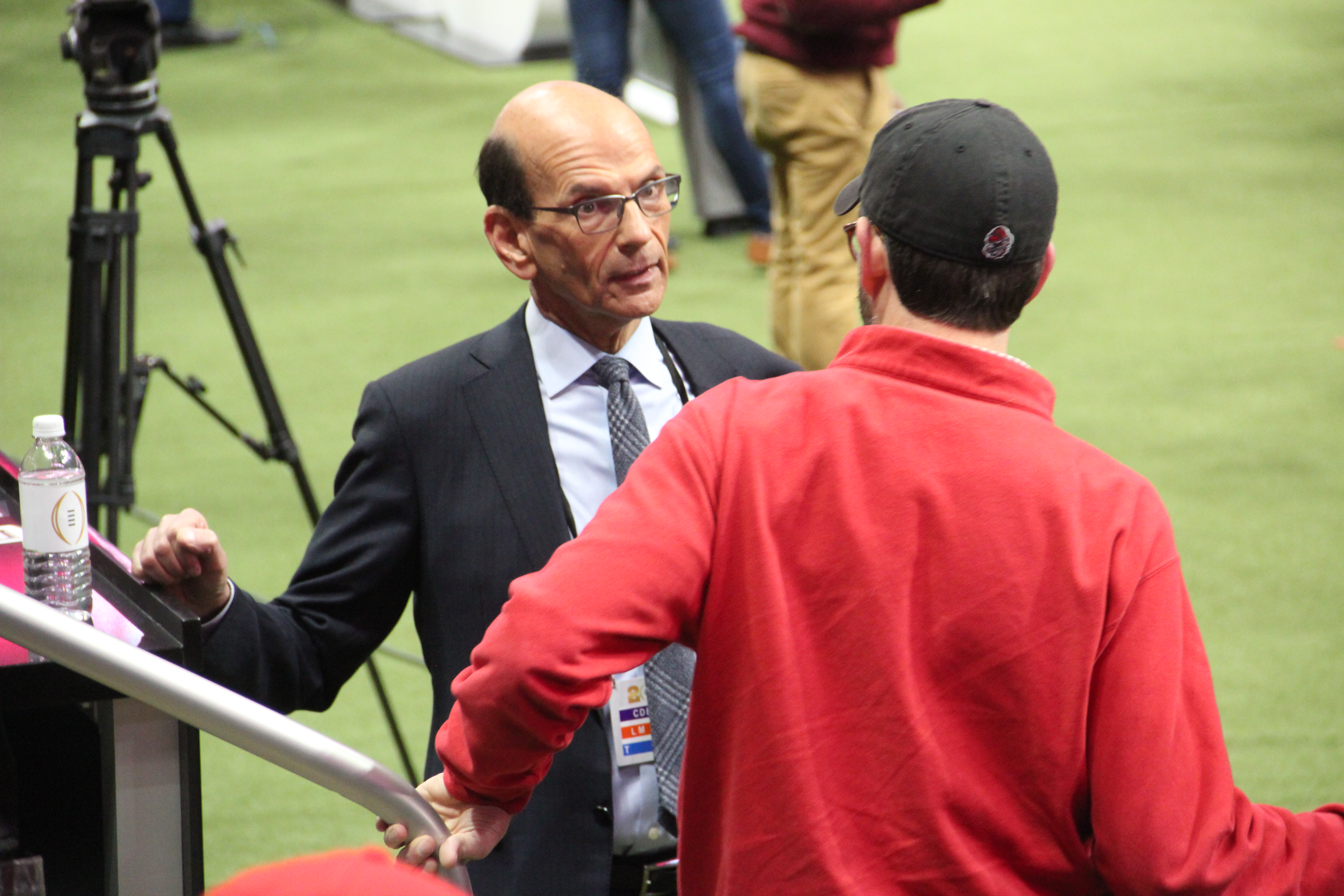
Finebaum (left) at the 2018 College Football Playoff National Championship media day

In October 2013, the University of Tennessee presented Finebaum with the Accomplished Alumni Award, "which recognizes notable alumni for their success and distinction within their field."

ESPN broadcaster Joe Tessitore said in a December 2018 podcast interview, "If you asked me who are the two greatest interviewers on radio and television, I would say Paul Finebaum and Howard Stern."

== Personal life ==
Finebaum and his wife, Linda Hudson, have been married since 1990.

Finebaum is a registered Republican, and has publicly expressed interest in seeking the party's nomination to run for Alabama's U.S. Senate seat being vacated by Tommy Tuberville in the 2026 election. He ruled out such a campaign in December 2025.
