= WAGG =

Birmingham, Alabama; United States
- Broadcast area: Greater Birmingham
- Frequency: 610 kHz
- Branding: Heaven 610

Programming
- Format: Urban gospel

Ownership
- Owner: SummitMedia; (SM-WAGG, LLC)
- Sister stations: WBHJ, WBHK, WBPT, WENN, WZZK-FM

History
- First air date: February 3, 1926
- Former call signs: WKBC (1926–1932); WSGN (1932–1985); WZZK (1985–1998); WEZN (1998–1999)
- Former frequencies: 1310 kHz (1926–1941)
- Call sign meaning: Alabama's Gospel Giant or A.G. Gaston (former owner)

Technical information
- Licensing authority: FCC
- Facility ID: 48717
- Class: B
- Power: 5,000 watts (day); 610 watts (night)
- Transmitter coordinates: 33°29′39″N 86°52′21″W
- Repeater: 95.7 WBHJ-HD2 (Midfield)

Links
- Public license information: Public file; LMS
- Webcast: Listen live
- Website: 610wagg.com

WAGG (610 AM) is a commercial radio station licensed to Birmingham, Alabama. Owned by SummitMedia, it broadcasts an urban gospel format that targets Birmingham's African-American community. Studios and offices are in the Cahaba neighborhood in Southeast Birmingham.

The station was assigned the WAGG call sign by the Federal Communications Commission on January 15, 1999. It broadcasts at 5,000 watts by day, reducing power to 610 watts at night to avoid interfering with other stations on AM 610. It uses a non-directional antenna at all times. The transmitter is off Avenue W, near the former site of Birmingham International Raceway.

== History of AM 610 ==
Birmingham's third oldest radio station signed on the air on February 3, 1926. Its call sign was WKBC, originally broadcasting at 1310 kilocycles. The owner of the station was the Broylee Furniture Company. Because the company sold radios, it wanted to put a radio station on the air for its customers to listen to. The station was only powered at 250 watts by day and 100 watts at night. The studios were in the Hotel Tutwiler.

In 1932, the call sign was changed to WSGN. The station was later sold to The Birmingham News, a daily newspaper which would use its staff of reporters to provide news bulletins to WSGN's listeners.

Throughout the 1940s, WSGN was an affiliate of the NBC Blue Network, the forerunner of the current ABC Network. Late in 1955, WSGN became the first station in Birmingham to adopt a Top 40 format, playing hits for the youth generation.

By the 1980s, young listeners were switching to FM radio for current and recent hits, so WSGN made a change. In February 1984, the station became known as "Real Music 610", playing adult standards and big band music for an older crowd who were still tuning to the AM band. This continued until April 26, 1985, when the owners sold the station and it became the AM simulcast partner of country music station WZZK-FM 104.7. After 53 years, the call letters of WSGN were changed to WZZK. This simulcast continued until 1998, when 610 AM returned to adult standards with the new call sign WEZN.

== History of WAGG ==
WAGG had been an urban gospel station since 1982. Before then, the call letters were WENN.

In 1998, Cox Radio, which already owned WZZK-FM, WODL-FM (now WBPT) and WEZN, bought WAGG, WBHJ and WBHK. One year later, WEZN and WAGG swapped dial positions in order for WAGG to take advantage of the superior signal on 610 AM.

On July 20, 2012, Cox Radio announced the sale of WAGG and 22 other stations to Summit Media LLC for $66.25 million. The sale was consummated on May 3, 2013.

On October 3, 2014, WAGG began simulcasting on FM translator W271BN at 102.1 MHz. Co-owned WENN 1320 AM, which had been simulcat on 102.1 temporarily went silent.

On March 14, 2016, WAGG switched FM translators. Its previous translator, W271BN, began simulcasting soft adult contemporary-formatted WENN. WAGG began to be heard on W261BX at 100.1 MHz. That translator at 100.1 later returned to a simulcast of 1320 WENN, now airing easy listening music.
