= WBHJ =

Coordinates: 33.460°N 86.852°W

Midfield, Alabama; United States
- Broadcast area: Birmingham metropolitan area
- Frequency: 95.7 MHz (HD Radio)
- Branding: 95.7 Jamz

Programming
- Format: Mainstream urban; Rhythmic contemporary
- Subchannels: HD2: Urban gospel (WAGG); HD3: WayFM Network

Ownership
- Owner: SummitMedia; (SM-WBHJ, LLC)
- Sister stations: WAGG, WBHK, WBPT, WENN, WZZK-FM

History
- First air date: 1958
- Former call signs: WTBC-FM (1958–1969); WUOA (1969–1984); WFFX (1984–1996)
- Call sign meaning: "Birmingham's Jamz"

Technical information
- Licensing authority: FCC
- Facility ID: 730
- Class: C2
- ERP: 12,000 watts
- HAAT: 306 meters (1,004 ft)
- Translators: HD3: 89.9 W210CA (Birmingham); HD3: 99.1 W256CD (Fultondale); HD3: 106.3 W292EI (Warrior)

Links
- Public license information: Public file; LMS
- Webcast: Listen live
- Website: 957jamz.com

WBHJ (95.7 FM) is a commercial radio station licensed to Midfield, Alabama, United States, and serving the Birmingham metropolitan area. It airs an urban-leaning rhythmic contemporary format and is owned by SummitMedia, Inc. It shares studios in the Cahaba neighborhood in far southeast Birmingham with SummitMedia's six other stations.

WBHJ's transmitter is sited on Red Mountain. The station also broadcasts in HD Radio: the HD2 subchannel rebroadcasts WAGG, while the HD3 subchannel carries WayFM Network, which feeds three FM translators.

== History ==
=== WTBC-FM Tuscaloosa ===
The station signed on the air in 1958. Its original call sign was WTBC-FM. Its city of license was Tuscaloosa and it was the sister station to WTBC (1230 AM). The two stations were owned by the Tuscaloosa Broadcasting Company and were network affiliates of the Mutual Broadcasting System.

WTBC-FM's transmitter was on 15th Street. WTBC-FM mostly simulcast the AM station, playing a stack of middle of the road (MOR) albums on a turntable. A contributor who worked at WTBC said that when the stack of records was finished, it just started playing over. The program director would go live for a few hours each night and was probably the only live person on the air daily.

In 1969, it changed its call letters to WUOA, standing for the University of Alabama. It played adult contemporary music and was owned by the university. Another change occurred in 1984 with the call letters switching to WFFX. The moniker became "95.7 the Fox" and the station played modern rock.

=== Move to Birmingham ===
The station moved its studios into the Birmingham radio market in the 1990s. During that period the transmitter moved to a taller tower near Vance. On July 15, 1996, the call letters were changed to WBHJ becoming "95.7 Jamz." The format switched to urban contemporary. The first Jamz program director was Mickey Johnson. Since that time, the station has been one of Birmingham's top rated radio stations.

WBHJ tower was roughly halfway between Tuscaloosa and Birmingham. This gave it an inadequate signal into its primary listening area of Birmingham. In November 2004, the station applied for a construction permit from the Federal Communications Commission (FCC) to move its transmitter from Vance to Red Mountain. In June 2005, the station completed a move to boost its signal. It changed its city of license to the Birmingham suburb of Midfield. Its transmitter site was relocated from rural Bibb County (near Vance) to Red Mountain, where the other high-power Birmingham stations are located. Although the move required a reduction in power from 100,000 watts to 12,200 watts, the increased antenna height and proximity to the population center of Birmingham provided a stronger signal to listeners.

=== SummitMedia ownership ===
For much of the early 2000s, WBHJ was owned by Atlanta-based Cox Radio, Inc. On July 20, 2012, Cox Radio announced the sale of WBHJ and 22 other stations to SummitMedia LLC for $66.25 million. The sale was consummated on May 3, 2013.

WBHJ is a rhythmic contemporary reporter on Mediabase and an urban reporter per Nielsen BDS. It carries the nationally syndicated wake-up show, The Morning Hustle, based at WGCI-FM Chicago. It is hosted by Kyle Santillian and Lore'l.

== Station management ==
- General Manager: John Walker
- Program Director: NuYork
- Music Director: Young Dil
