= WJOX (AM) =

Sports radio station in Birmingham, Alabama

- Birmingham, Alabama; United States
- Broadcast area: Birmingham Metropolitan Area
- Frequency: 690 kHz
- Branding: Jox 3

Programming
- Format: Sports
- Affiliations: ESPN Radio

Ownership
- Owner: Cumulus Media; (Radio License Holding CBC, LLC)
- Sister stations: WAPI; WJOX-FM; WJQX; WUHT; WZRR

History
- First air date: 1947
- Former call signs: WVOK (1947–1992); WJOX (1992–2006); WSPZ (2006–2010)
- Call sign meaning: "Jocks", slang for athletes

Technical information
- Licensing authority: FCC
- Facility ID: 16897
- Class: B
- Power: 50,000 watts (day); 500 watts (night)
- Transmitter coordinates: 33°27′2″N 86°55′19″W

Links
- Public license information: Public file; LMS
- Website: www.wjoxam.com

WJOX (690 AM, "Jox 3 ESPN") is a commercial radio station licensed to Birmingham, Alabama, United States. Owned by Cumulus Media, it features a sports format as the Birmingham affiliate of ESPN Radio, with studios located in Homewood and the transmitter sited in Midfield. WJOX is Alabama's primary entry point station for the Emergency Alert System.

== History ==
The station that now broadcasts from 690 AM in Birmingham signed on in 1947 as WVOK. It was the first radio station in Birmingham to broadcast with 50,000 watts. Due to Federal Communications Commission restrictions, the station broadcast only during daytime hours. It was not until the early 1980s that WVOK was able to broadcast 24 hours a day. AM 690 is a Canadian and Mexican clear-channel frequency.

Throughout the 1960s and into the 1970s, WVOK was a Top 40 station calling itself "The Mighty 690" with a signal that covered almost all of north and central Alabama, as well as parts of Mississippi, Georgia and Tennessee. Rather than attempting to compete with crosstown station (and market leader) WSGN, WVOK targeted listeners in the rural areas of the states its signal reached. One of the most popular promotions of WVOK was their "Shower of Stars" concert series. Throughout the 1960s and 1970s, these concerts brought such performers as the Rolling Stones, Jerry Lee Lewis, Neil Diamond and the Beach Boys to Birmingham.

In 1976, WVOK dropped Top 40 music and became a country station using the nickname OK 69. At about the same time, sister station WVOK-FM signed on with an album rock format. Country music on WVOK continued until 1985, when the station changed to adult contemporary music before moving to an oldies format. In 1989, oldies were dropped, and the station began playing classic country music.

During the late 1980s and early 1990s, several AM stations in Birmingham debuted afternoon sports talk call-in shows. Local sportswriter Paul Finebaum had debuted a popular show on WAPI. In 1990, Herb Winches, a former TV sports anchor on WBRC and WVTM, moved his own popular show with co-host Ben Cook from WERC to WVOK. Because Winches' show was fairly successful, and because, by the 1990s, there were few AM radio stations that were successful playing music, station management made the decision to launch an all-sports station, WJOX, in 1992.

On November 29, 2006, WJOX began simulcasting on the 100.5 FM frequency of sister station WRAX. On December 1, the AM station changed its call letters to WSPZ, and the WJOX call sign moved to the FM station. On January 8, 2007, WJOX and WSPZ began separate sports programming schedules. Three of the local call-in shows from the former WJOX moved to FM, and a new morning-drive show was created, reuniting former WJOX morning drive personalities Matt Coulter and Scott Griffin. As a result of the change, and to differentiate itself from WJOX, an affiliate of ESPN Radio, WSPZ affiliated with Fox Sports Radio. Coulter was let go by WSPZ on January 22, 2008, when his contract was not renewed. Scott Griffin was fired on July 17, 2008, and his show was replaced with syndicated sports talk, then Imus in the Morning.

The station returned to the WJOX call sign on February 8, 2010, when it began simulcasting WJOX-FM 94.5. On January 1, 2012, WJOX split from its simulcast with WJOX-FM, rebranded as "690 The Fan", and returned to carrying primarily Fox Sports Radio. In 2013, the station was once again rebranded as "Jox 3".

The station airs 10 University of Alabama at Birmingham baseball games each season as part of the Blazers ISP Sports Network.

== Programming ==
All the programming is from ESPN Radio. WJOX is also the local affiliate of the UAB Blazers Radio Network (baseball only), the Tennessee Titans Radio Network and the Atlanta Braves Radio Network.
