= WJOX-FM =

Coordinates: 33.463°N 86.850°W

- Birmingham, Alabama; United States
- Broadcast area: Central Alabama
- Frequency: 94.5 MHz (HD Radio)
- Branding: JOX 94.5

Programming
- Format: Sports
- Affiliations: Westwood One Sports; Atlanta Braves Radio Network; Tennessee Titans Radio Network

Ownership
- Owner: Cumulus Media; (Radio License Holding CBC, LLC)
- Sister stations: WJOX; WJQX; WUHT; WZRR

History
- First air date: December 1, 1947
- Former call signs: WAFM (1947–1958); WAPI-FM (1958–1994); WMXQ (1994–1996); WYSF (1996–2008)
- Former frequencies: 93.3 MHz (1947–1949); 99.5 MHz (1949–1963)
- Call sign meaning: Jocks (slang for athletes)

Technical information
- Licensing authority: FCC
- Facility ID: 16901
- Class: C0
- ERP: 100,000 watts
- HAAT: 309 meters (1,014 ft)

Links
- Public license information: Public file; LMS
- Webcast: Listen live; Listen live (via iHeartRadio)
- Website: www.joxfm.com

WJOX-FM (94.5 MHz) is a commercial radio station licensed to Birmingham, Alabama, airing a sports radio format. Cumulus Media owns three sports stations in the Birmingham radio market: WJOX-FM, WJOX (690 AM), and WJQX (100.5 FM). They have studios on Goodwin Crest Drive near Interstate 65 in Homewood.

WJOX-FM has an effective radiated power (ERP) of 100,000 watts, the maximum for most FM stations. The transmitter is atop the west ridge of Red Mountain, amid the towers for other Birmingham-area FM and TV station.

== Programming ==
On weekdays, WJOX-FM has local sports hosts during the day and carries Westwood One Sports programming late nights and weekends. It had also been the Birmingham area flagship station for University of Alabama sports. WJOX-FM carries Atlanta Braves baseball and Tennessee Titans football.

In 2007, WJOX-FM became the flagship station of the Paul Finebaum Show. Finebaum is a noted radio host and expert on college sports in the South. Finebaum's show is syndicated throughout Alabama and adjoining states. In 2013, Finebaum moved to ESPN Radio to host The Paul Finebaum Show for the SEC Network, with WJOX continuing to carry the show. His show, now based in Charlotte, is heard in afternoon drive time on WJOX-FM.

== History ==
=== WAFM and WAPI-FM ===
The forerunner of WJOX-FM signed on the air on December 1, 1947. Its original call sign was WAFM. By 1949, the station was broadcasting on 99.5 FM. It was powered at 540,000 watts, much more powerful than nearly all FM stations today. It was a sister station to WAPI (1070 AM). A television station was launched, also in 1949, as WAFM-TV (channel 13).

WAFM changed its call sign in 1958 to WAPI-FM to match the call letters of WAPI AM; the television station (which had been renamed WABT in the interim) concurrently became WAPI-TV. All three broadcast properties were owned by Advance Publications, the parent company of The Birmingham News. Through the 1950s and 1960s, WAPI and WAPI-FM largely simulcast their programming. In 1963, WAPI-FM moved to its current dial position at 94.5 MHz. In the early 1970s, WAPI-FM separated from the simulcast. It had a format it called "Solid Gold", an early version of adult contemporary. In 1978, the station flipped to easy listening music, calling itself "Beautiful 94". It was later branded as "FM 94 WAPI, A Pleasure To Be Around". It played quarter hour sweeps of soft, instrumental music, putting it in competition with WQEZ.

Advance Publications owned Birmingham's popular daily newspaper, as well as highly-rated TV, AM and FM stations, at a time when the Federal Communications Commission (FCC) was discouraging such concentration of media outlets under common ownership. FCC rules enacted in the late 1970s forced Advance Publications to sell its TV and radio properties in Birmingham. In 1980, WAPI-TV was sold to Times-Mirror Broadcasting and renamed WVTM-TV, while the radio stations were sold to Dittman Broadcasting, owners of WABB and WABB-FM in Mobile.

=== Album rock and Top 40 ===
In August 1981, 94.5 switched its format. It became Birmingham's second album oriented rock (AOR) station with the new name "95 Rock". Popular artists on 95 Rock included The Rolling Stones, Bruce Springsteen, Fleetwood Mac, The Eagles, Tom Petty and The Who.

During the mid-1980s, the Top 40 format, which had disappeared from radio dials in some cities, was regaining popularity. Birmingham had one FM Top 40 station, WKXX. In 1984, the album rock format was dropped in favor of Top 40. WAPI-FM first called itself "95 FM". By the end of the year, WAPI-FM was re-launched as "I-95", calling itself "Birmingham's Hit Rock". Within a year, I-95 had replaced WKXX as the dominant Top 40 station in Birmingham. The most notable DJs on I-95 were Mark Thompson and Brian Phelps, who first teamed at I-95 before moving to KLOS in Los Angeles in 1987. The pair became one of LA's most popular morning radio shows for two decades.

=== Hot AC and soft AC ===
I-95 continued to enjoy dominant ratings throughout the remainder of the 1980s, using the slogan "Birmingham’s All-Hit I-95" for the remainder of that decade. It began calling itself "The Station in the '90s" through the 1990s. However, the nationwide decline in the popularity of the Top 40 format affected I-95.

On April 22, 1994, at 5 p.m., the station changed call letters to WMXQ "Mix 94.5". It became a hot adult contemporary music station. "Mix" was no more successful than I-95 had been in its latter stages. On September 25, 1996, the station once again changed formats and became a soft adult contemporary station with the new name "Soft Rock 94.5". The call letters were changed to WYSF in November of the same year. Television ads for the new station featured actress Teri Garr, telling viewers that WYSF was a great station to have on their office radio.

In 1999, the morning drive time team of Rick and Bubba moved from crosstown station WQEN to WYSF. They remained at WYSF until December 2006, when they departed for country music station WZZK-FM. In 2001, the station renamed itself "Y-94.5", with no real change in its music.

In reaction to a steep drop in ratings after the departure of Rick and Bubba, WYSF changed its format. At 5:00 p.m. on May 25, 2007, it dropped its soft adult contemporary format and returned to hot adult contemporary, changing the station's moniker to "The New 94-5 FM".

=== Sports ===
On July 4, 2008, the station dropped its hot AC music and began stunting in anticipation of a new format. The station began playing country music at approximately 9:25 p.m. and continued doing so for the next two days. The station then began simulcasting co-owned sports radio station WJOX (100.5 FM) as a temporary measure until the format change was completed. WJOX-FM made 94.5 its permanent home on July 22, 2008.

In February 2010, WJOX-FM began simulcasting on WJOX (690 AM). This returned the WJOX sports format to the facility where it was introduced to the Birmingham market in 1992. WJOX AM returned to a separate lineup in 2012.

The WJOX call letters were previously assigned to 106.1 FM in Jackson, Michigan, from 1976 to 1981. The WJOX call letters were dropped by 106.1 FM on March 11, 1981, when the station adopted its current call letters WJXQ ("Q106").
