= Central Alabama =

Region of the US state of Alabama

Coordinates: 33°18′36″N 86°47′15″W

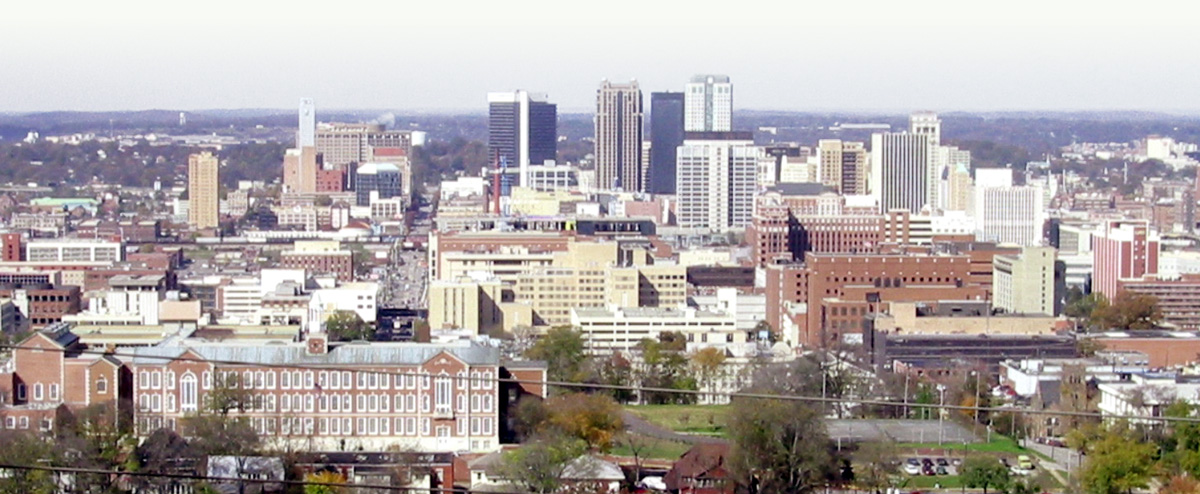
Downtown Birmingham, the economic heart of Central Alabama

Central Alabama is a region in the state of Alabama. It is sometimes considered part of North Alabama because both regions are mountainous, but in some definitions they are different regions.

The Valley and Ridge Province of the Appalachians consist mainly of long, low ridges such as Red Mountain, Sand Mountain, Beaver Creek Mountain, Shades Mountain, and Coldwater Mountain in this region, and make impressive backdrops in the Greater Birmingham, Gadsden, and Anniston metropolitan areas. The easternmost part of Central Alabama around Anniston has the steepest mountains and highest elevations of the region. Coldwater Mountain and Mount Cheaha make up the highest of the mountain ridges that are located in the eastern portion of the region. The Coosa River divides the easternmost portion of the region from the central portion with the Birmingham area. Extending across Central Alabama is relatively a flat region with fertile black soil called the Black Belt. The Black Warrior River and its tributaries contribute to the fertile land of the area, and also serve as a demarcation line between the western and the central portions of the region. The central portion of Central Alabama varies from rugged in the east to flat in the west. Numerous valleys are scattered throughout this region between the mountain ridges including the densely populated Jones Valley and Shades Valley. Because the central portion is more rugged compared to the westernmost portion of Central Alabama, it is also the most flood-prone. Urban sprawl has exacerbated the risk of flooding by increasing the proportion of land covered by hard surfaces, leading to greater runoff during storms.

The Black Warrior, Cahaba, and Coosa Rivers and their tributaries are among the many waterways that wind their way through the region. Other major waterways that run through the area include Choccolocco Creek, Shades Creek, and Little Cahaba River.

Large deposits of iron ore, limestone, and coal are chief among the plentiful mineral resources found in the region. The coincidence of these three in close proximity was a major incentive for the rapid development of industry in the Birmingham District after the American Civil War.

== Economy ==
The economic engine of the region ranges from the diversified economy of Greater Birmingham, to the college town of Tuscaloosa, to the heavily industrialized economy of Anniston and Gadsden.

The primary economic center of the region is Greater Birmingham because of its size and diversified economy. It is home to the state's most diversified employer, the University of Alabama at Birmingham (UAB). UAB is not only the state's largest single employer with some 20,000 employees on its payroll, but also one of the largest medical districts in the Southeast. In addition, most of the state-based corporations such as Alabama Power, Energen Corporation, HealthSouth Corporation, Regions Financial Corporation, Saks Incorporated, and Southern Research Institute have their world headquarters located in the area. Though the Mercedes-Benz and Honda automotive production facilities are not technically located in any of the Greater Birmingham metropolitan counties, they are both considered as substantial contributors to its economy.

Tuscaloosa is the retail business center of a several-county area in Alabama and nearby Mississippi, and is chiefly a university town. The city hosts the University of Alabama's main campus as well as Stillman College and Shelton State Community College. Other major components of the economy include government, health, and industry. The city's largest industrial employer is the Mercedes-Benz production facility located ten miles from the main part of the city next to Vance.

Anniston and Gadsden are very similar in their heavily industrialized economies. Gadsden, however, is a river town so it has helped in building and creating a tourist industry to slight the blow of its declining primary industry. Gadsden is now home to many riverfront-based festivals that goes on throughout the year to boost its economy. Anniston, on the other hand, has also suffered a major blow on two fronts with the closings of Fort McClellan and many iron smelting facilities in the 1990s. However, it has turned more towards military production at the Anniston Army Depot with several government production contracts issued to this facility.

== Important cities ==
- Anniston
- Alabaster
- Auburn
- Birmingham
- Bessemer
- Calera
- Clanton
- Cullman
- Gadsden
- Hoover
- Jemison
- Jasper
- Montevallo
- Montgomery
- Pelham
- Selma
- Sylacauga
- Tuscaloosa
- Valley

== See also ==
- 2011 Central Alabama tornado
