= WDBB =

Television station in Bessemer, Alabama

Satellite of WTTO, Homewood, Alabama, and WBMA-LD, Birmingham, Alabama
- Bessemer–Tuscaloosa, Alabama; United States
- City: Bessemer, Alabama
- Channels: Digital: 14 (UHF); Virtual: 17

Programming
- Affiliations: 17.1: Independent; 17.2: ABC; for others, see § Subchannels

Ownership
- Owner: Cunningham Broadcasting; (WDBB-TV, Inc.)
- Operator: Sinclair Broadcast Group
- Sister stations: WABM, WBMA-LD

History
- First air date: October 8, 1984
- Former channel numbers: Analog: 17 (UHF, 1984–2009); Digital: 18 (UHF, until 2020)
- Former affiliations: Independent (1984–1986, 1990–1991, 1996–1997); Fox (1986–1990, 1991–1996); The WB (1997–2006); The CW (2006–2026)
- Call sign meaning: Original owner Dubose Broadcasting

Technical information
- Licensing authority: FCC
- Facility ID: 71325
- ERP: 675 kW
- HAAT: 637 m (2,090 ft)
- Transmitter coordinates: 33°28′48″N 87°25′50″W

Links
- Public license information: Public file; LMS
- Website: wtto21.com

WDBB (channel 17) is an independent television station licensed to Bessemer, Alabama, United States, serving Tuscaloosa and west Alabama as a satellite of Birmingham-based WTTO (channel 21). It is owned by Cunningham Broadcasting and operated by Sinclair Broadcast Group alongside WTTO, fellow independent WABM (channel 68), and regional ABC affiliate WBMA-LD (channel 58, branded as ABC 33/40), which WDBB also rebroadcasts. WDBB's transmitter is located near Windham Springs, east of State Route 69; its parent station share studios with WABM and WBMA-LD at the Riverchase office park on Concourse Parkway in Hoover.

WDBB was started as a local independent station by Dubose Broadcasting in 1984; it soon expanded to cover Birmingham. In 1986, the station launched WNAL-TV (channel 44) in Gadsden, which together with WDBB provided regional coverage. WDBB-WNAL served as the Fox Broadcasting Company affiliate for the Tuscaloosa, Birmingham, and Anniston–Gadsden markets from the network's launch in 1986 until 1990, when the affiliation went to WTTO; WDBB began simulcasting that station the next year due to financial difficulties. WDBB and WTTO lost Fox in 1996 due to a major regional shuffle of network affiliations, affiliating with The WB in 1997 and with The CW in 2006.

== History ==
On March 23, 1983, Channel 17 of Tuscaloosa, Inc., filed an application with the Federal Communications Commission (FCC) to build a new commercial TV station in the city. Shareholders in the applicant were headlined by David R. Dubose, who was then the news director at WUAL-FM at the University of Alabama.

WDBB began broadcasting on October 8, 1984, from studios on Jug Factory Road. It served as Tuscaloosa's second commercial station and first independent. It would not, however, remain focused on Tuscaloosa for long. Even though Birmingham was just barely large enough at the time to support two independent stations, WDBB felt there was room for another station in the market, particularly because Birmingham had only two TV newsrooms at the time. In 1985, it spent $3.5 million to upgrade its transmission facility, building a 2,000-foot (610 m) tower midway between Tuscaloosa and Birmingham. Activated in early 1986 alongside a translator in the immediate Birmingham area, W62BG, the improved signal earned WDBB a place on most cable systems in Jefferson County. In addition, it became the production home for the coaches shows of Alabama Crimson Tide athletics, and in 1986, it obtained exclusive market rights for them in Birmingham, displacing WBRC (channel 6) as their local broadcaster.

May 1, 1986, brought the launch of WNAL-TV, which—while independently owned—rebroadcast WDBB's programming to eastern Alabama. Due to low ratings and the return of WBMG to the local news game, WDBB opted to cease local news in September 1986. However, the stations were about to get a lift; in October 1986, WDBB-WNAL became central Alabama's first Fox affiliate. It continued to air Fox programming until September 1, 1990, when Fox moved to WTTO.

In the late 1980s, WDBB had several disputes over its rating status in the Birmingham area of dominant influence (ADI) as measured by Arbitron, then one of two companies that produced television ratings. It had asked Arbitron in 1985 to be listed in the Birmingham ratings instead of Tuscaloosa, then a separate and far smaller ADI. The next year, Arbitron agreed as long as viewership was combined with WNAL; however, after less than a year, Arbitron rescinded this arrangement after being pressured by competing stations in Birmingham and having NBC affiliate WVTM-TV cancel its contract. In 1989, a federal jury awarded WDBB and WNAL $5.5 million in damages, finding Arbitron guilty of fraud and breach of contract. In 1990, the station also filed to change its city of license to Bessemer, a suburb of Birmingham, in order to be placed within the Birmingham ADI; the FCC turned the request down. WDBB would ultimately win reassignment in 1996 after contesting the FCC's decision, with the review finding Bessemer was independent enough of Birmingham to be allotted the station.

Due to financial difficulties, WDBB and WNAL began simulcasting WTTO on January 30, 1991. In return, WTTO added several of WDBB's stronger syndicated programs to its schedule. In addition to programming contracts, WTTO also purchased WDBB's Birmingham business offices and W62BG, and WDBB moved operations back to the Jug Factory Road site. The structure of WTTO's relationship with WDBB and WNAL changed to one of an affiliation. Dubose also announced the addition of local programming, including news, to the station.

In 1994, Dubose sold the station to WDBB-TV Inc., a subsidiary of H&P Communications of Las Vegas, for $2.5 million. At that time, channel 17 expanded to add noon and 5 p.m. newscasts. However, turmoil was roiling the Birmingham market. Earlier that year, WBRC was sold to New World Communications, which not only owned WVTM but had signed a deal to convert 12 stations into Fox affiliates, including WBRC. Due to ownership overlap, WBRC was sold directly to Fox in 1995. That would leave WTTO, WDBB, and WNAL out of an affiliation—and ABC without a carrier in Birmingham. All three stations began discussing affiliation with ABC; in fact, WDBB was already a year into negotiations by 1995. Amidst this uncertain backdrop, Sinclair moved to take programming control of WDBB in November 1995 with the signing of the programming services agreement. However, ABC bypassed Sinclair's stations and instead opted to partner with Allbritton Communications to use WCFT in Tuscaloosa and WJSU in Anniston to start a new regional ABC affiliate. Sinclair moved to end the WDBB newscasts that December, putting 25 to 30 news staff and another 10 to 15 production employees out of work.

On September 1, 1996, WBRC became the new Fox affiliate for Birmingham, Tuscaloosa, and Anniston. WNAL-TV broke off to become the CBS affiliate for the Anniston–Gadsden area, and the other two stations continued as independents until affiliating with The WB in 1997. WTTO and WDBB became affiliates of The CW in 2006 when The WB and UPN merged. The license was transferred from H&P to Cunningham in 2010.

== Subchannels ==
Subchannels of WDBB
Subchannel	Res.	Short name	Programming
17.1	720p	WDBB/WTTO	WTTO (Independent)
17.2	720p	ABC3340	ABC (WBMA-LD)
17.3	480i	Weather	James Spann 24/7 Weather (WBMA-LD)
33.1	480i	H & I	Heroes & Icons (WSES)
33.2	480i	Decades	Catchy Comedy (WSES)
33.3	720p	START	Start TV (WSES)

Simulcast of subchannels of another station
Broadcast on behalf of another station

In 2014, Sinclair purchased Allbritton Communications. However, it could not continue to own WCFT or WJSU without divestitures. Those stations were divested to Howard Stirk Holdings; in the case of the Tuscaloosa station, now WSES, ABC 33/40 moved to the WDBB multiplex.
