= WSES =

Television station in Tuscaloosa, Alabama

ATSC 3.0 station
- Tuscaloosa–Birmingham, Alabama; United States
- City: Tuscaloosa, Alabama
- Channels: Digital: 36 (UHF); Virtual: 33
- Branding: WSES Channel 33

Programming
- Affiliations: 33.1: Heroes & Icons; 33.2: Catchy Comedy; 33.3: Start TV

Ownership
- Owner: Howard Stirk Holdings; (HSH Birmingham (WCFT) Licensee, LLC)
- Sister stations: WGWW, WBMA-LD, WTTO, WABM

History
- First air date: October 27, 1965
- Former call signs: WCFT-TV (1965–2015)
- Former channel numbers: Analog: 33 (UHF, 1965–2009); Digital: 5 (VHF, 2004–2009), 33 (UHF, 2009–2020)
- Former affiliations: Independent (1965–1970); NBC (secondary, 1967–1970); CBS (1970–1996); ABC, via WBMA-LD (1996–2014); Heartland (2014–2015)

Technical information
- Licensing authority: FCC
- Facility ID: 21258
- ERP: 800 kW
- HAAT: 660.8 m (2,168 ft)
- Transmitter coordinates: 33°28′48″N 87°25′50″W

Links
- Public license information: Public file; LMS
- Website: www.howardstirkholdings.com/stations

WSES (channel 33) is a television station licensed to Tuscaloosa, Alabama, United States, serving the western portion of the Birmingham market as an affiliate of the digital multicast network Heroes & Icons. The station is owned by Howard Stirk Holdings, a partner company of the Sinclair Broadcast Group. WSES's advertising sales office is located on Golden Crest Drive in Birmingham, and its transmitter is located near County Road 38/Blue Creek Road, east of State Route 69 near Windham Springs.

WGWW (channel 40) in Anniston operates as a full-time satellite of WSES.

== History ==
=== As an independent station ===
The station first signed on the air on October 27, 1965, as WCFT-TV. Originally operating as an independent station, it was the first television station to sign on in western Alabama. It was originally owned by Chapman Family Television, a consortium of eight Tuscaloosa businessmen who saw the benefits of operating a television station to serve west-central Alabama, in terms of both business and community service purposes.

However, the station did not return a profit suitable enough for its owners throughout its first two years of operation, an issue that led Chapman Family Television to sell the station to South Mississippi Broadcasting, Inc. (later Service Broadcasters) in 1967, becoming the company's second television station, after flagship WDAM-TV in the company's home market of Hattiesburg, Mississippi. The new owners rejuvenated WCFT by heavily investing in the station, purchasing new broadcasting and transmission equipment, and improving the station's image. In addition to carrying syndicated programming, WCFT-TV also aired network programs from CBS and NBC that were not cleared for broadcast in the Birmingham market by WAPI-TV (channel 13, now WVTM-TV), which WBMG (channel 42, now WIAT) did during that same timeframe.

=== As an exclusive CBS affiliate ===
On May 31, 1970, when WAPI-TV formally removed CBS programming and became the exclusive NBC affiliate for the Birmingham market, WCFT-TV became an exclusive CBS affiliate; WBMG in Birmingham (which had been affiliated with the network since it signed in October 1965, in a similar split arrangement with NBC) and WHMA-TV (channel 40) in Anniston (which had been an exclusive CBS affiliate since it debuted in October 1969) also became exclusive CBS affiliates, with each serving different portions of central Alabama.

Even though Tuscaloosa is 58 miles (93 km) southwest of Birmingham, CBS opted to retain its affiliation with WCFT because, at the time, WBMG suffered from a severely weak broadcast signal that did not provide adequate coverage to all of central Alabama. Despite Birmingham's relatively close proximity to the city, the WBMG signal barely covered Tuscaloosa. Even after channel 42 increased its transmitter power to 1.2 million watts in 1969, it provided marginal to non-existent coverage of much of west-central Alabama. As such, many cable providers in the western part of the market opted to carry WCFT rather than WBMG. WCFT regularly trounced WBMG in that portion of the market (even in western areas of the Birmingham metropolitan area that could receive WCFT's signal). Unlike WBMG, channel 33 was fairly competitive with WBRC-TV (channel 6) and WAPI/WVTM, especially with its local newscasts that focused almost exclusively on western Alabama.

Although the area was only served at the time by WCFT and Alabama Public Television satellite station WIIQ (channel 41) in Demopolis, Arbitron decided to break off Tuscaloosa into its own separate television market in 1977, placing it at a ranking below #170. On January 1, 1978, Service Broadcasters sold WDAM and WCFT to Beam Communications (which changed its name to Beacon Communications in June 1989). On August 20, 1990, Beacon sold WCFT and WDAM to Federal Broadcasting.

=== As a satellite of WBMA-LP/-LD ===
On May 5, 1994, Great American Communications (which would be renamed Citicasters following the completion of its debt restructuring later that year) agreed to sell WBRC and three of its sister stations—fellow ABC affiliate WGHP in High Point, North Carolina, NBC affiliate WDAF-TV in Kansas City and CBS affiliate KSAZ-TV in Phoenix—to New World Communications for $350 million in cash and $10 million in share warrants. As part of a broader deal between New World and the Fox Broadcasting Company signed on May 23 of that year, New World agreed to affiliate five of its eight existing television stations and the four it had acquired from Great American with Fox, in a series of affiliation transactions that would take two years to complete due to the varying conclusion dates of their ongoing contracts with either ABC, NBC or CBS. Three weeks later, New World agreed to buy WVTM-TV and three other stations—CBS affiliates KDFW in Dallas–Fort Worth and KTBC in Austin, and ABC affiliate KTVI in St. Louis—from Argyle Television Holdings, in a purchase option-structured deal worth $717 million. Due to conflicts with FCC ownership rules of the time period, New World subsequently decided to establish and transfer the licenses of WBRC and WGHP into a trust company, with the intent to sell them to the Fox network's broadcasting subsidiary, Fox Television Stations (in the case of Birmingham, New World could not keep WBRC and WVTM since the FCC then forbade a single company from owning two television stations in the same market; the concurrent Argyle and Citicasters acquisitions also put New World three stations over the FCC's twelve-station ownership limit).

Although the sales of WBRC and WGHP were finalized on July 24, 1995, Fox Television Stations could not switch WBRC's network affiliation in the short term, as the station's contract with ABC would not expire until August 31, 1996. While this forced Fox to operate WBRC as an ABC affiliate for thirteen months after the sale's closure, it gave the latter network enough time to find a new central Alabama affiliate. ABC first approached WTTO (channel 21)—which, along with semi-satellites WDBB (channel 17) in Tuscaloosa and WNAL-TV (channel 44, now Ion Television affiliate WPXH-TV) in Gadsden, was set to lose its Fox affiliation to channel 6—for a deal to replace WBRC as its Birmingham outlet. However, the owner of WTTO, Sinclair Broadcast Group, only expressed interest in carrying ABC's prime time and news programming. It also refused to launch a news department for WTTO, as the group did not factor local news production into its corporate budget at the time (this was despite the fact that sister station WDBB had maintained a standalone news operation at the time ABC started negotiations with WTTO, which was eventually shut down when the former switched to a full-time WTTO simulcast in December 1995).

In November 1995, Allbritton Communications purchased WCFT from Federal Broadcasting for $20 million; it concurrently signed a deal with Fant Broadcasting to assume operational responsibilities for WNAL-TV under a local marketing agreement (LMA). Then in January 1996, after it terminated the WNAL deal, Allbritton acquired the non-license assets of WJSU-TV from Osborne Communications Corporation for $12 million (through an LMA arrangement which included an option to eventually purchase the station outright). Allbritton wanted to relocate WJSU's transmitter facilities closer to Birmingham to provide a stronger signal within that metropolitan area and nearby Tuscaloosa; however, the relocation was prohibited under FCC regulations that required a station's transmitter site be located no more than 15 miles (24 km) from its city of license (Anniston is 63 miles (101 km) north-of-due-east of Birmingham), which would have required an application to change the city of license closer to Birmingham in order to legally allow the move.

Shortly after the WJSU purchase took place, ABC reached a unique deal with Allbritton, in which WCFT and WJSU would become the new ABC affiliates for Central Alabama, with WCFT acting as the main station. ABC had a very strong relationship with Allbritton, particularly as Allbritton's flagship station, WJLA-TV in Washington, D.C., had long been one of ABC's highest-rated affiliates. In April 1996, a few months after the Birmingham deal was struck, Allbritton's ties to ABC were sealed wholesale when Allbritton reached a ten-year affiliation agreement with ABC that renewed contracts with the group's four existing ABC affiliates (WJLA-TV, KATV in Little Rock, Arkansas, KTUL in Tulsa, Oklahoma, and WHTM in Harrisburg, Pennsylvania, the latter of which was in the process of being acquired by Allbritton at the time) and resulted in two of its other stations switching to the network (NBC affiliate WCIV [now Heroes & Icons affiliate WGWG] in Charleston, South Carolina) and WB affiliate WBSG-TV [now Ion Television owned-and-operated station WPXC-TV] in Brunswick, Georgia), the latter of which would become a satellite of WJXX in nearby Jacksonville, Florida, when Allbritton signed that station on in February 1997).

However, under Nielsen rules, neither WCFT nor WJSU would have likely been counted in the Birmingham ratings books as it had designated Tuscaloosa and Anniston as separate markets at the time. Allbritton's solution to this issue was to purchase W58CK, a low-power independent station in Birmingham that began operations on November 18, 1994, which would serve as the primary station for the purpose of being counted in local ratings diaries (the three stations would later be collectively rated as "WBMA+"). While the purchase of channel 58 was not a condition of the deal between ABC and Allbritton, it did pave the way for Anniston and Tuscaloosa to be consolidated back into the Birmingham television market in September 1998 (at the start of the 1998–99 television season). That move benefited all of the major Birmingham stations, as it not only increased their viewership in Tuscaloosa and Anniston, but also resulted in Birmingham's placement in Nielsen's national market rankings jumping twelve spots from 51st to 39th place.

On September 1, 1996, when W58CK became an ABC affiliate, WCFT and WJSU concurrently ended separate operations as well and became full-powered satellite stations of W58CK, with Allbritton assuming control of WJSU's operations under the originally proposed LMA, which was transferred to Flagship Broadcasting upon that company's purchase of that station (Allbritton would eventually purchase WJSU-TV outright in 2008). WCFT's studio facilities near Skyland Boulevard in Tuscaloosa were converted into the Tuscaloosa news bureau for W58CK's news department; its master control operations were migrated into W58CK's new studios on Concourse Parkway in Hoover. WCFT and WJSU also ceded the CBS programming rights in central Alabama to WBMG, which had recently upgraded its transmitter to provide a much stronger full-power signal throughout much of the Birmingham market, and WNAL-TV, which took over as CBS's northeastern Alabama affiliate on the day of the WBRC/WBMA+/WTTO switch.

Even though WBMA was the official ABC affiliate for the Birmingham market, Allbritton chose instead to name the triumvirate operation "ABC 33/40", using the over-the-air channel numbers of WCFT and WJSU instead as the collective branding for the stations, making it appear as if WCFT was the primary station and WJSU was acting as its satellite. In the case of WCFT, its signal footprint covered the western portions of the Birmingham metropolitan area and outlying rural areas of western Jefferson County, stretching westward to Columbus, Mississippi (which had been served by WLOV-TV until it became a Fox affiliate in October 1995, leaving that city without an ABC affiliate until WKDH signed on in June 2001); the station's broadcast signal provided a contour of at least Grade B coverage within Birmingham's western inner ring. Cable (and eventually, satellite) providers within west-central Alabama received WBMA's programming through WCFT.

=== Acquisition by Sinclair ===
For over a decade and a half, WBMA+ maintained a strong relationship with Allbritton, with no major problems arising between the two entities and, likewise, no major changes occurring to the station's operations. On July 29, 2013, Allbritton announced that it would sell its seven television stations, including WBMA+, to the Sinclair Broadcast Group (which would purchase the stations for $985 million), in an attempt by the company to shift its focus toward co-owned political news website, Politico. As part of the deal, Sinclair had intended to sell the license assets of its existing Birmingham stations, CW affiliate WTTO and MyNetworkTV affiliate WABM (channel 68) to Deerfield Media, and retain operational responsibilities for those stations through shared services and joint sales agreements. At the time, no affiliation changes were expected.

On December 6, 2013, the FCC informed Sinclair that applications related to the deal need to be "amended or withdrawn", as Sinclair would retain an existing time brokerage agreement between WTTO and its satellite station, WDBB (channel 17); this would, in effect, create a new LMA between WBMA+ and WDBB, even though the commission had ruled in 1999 that such agreements made after November 5, 1996, covering the programming of more than 15 percent of a station's broadcast day would count toward the ownership limits for the brokering station's owner. A sale of WBMA and its satellites to a separate buyer was also not an option for Sinclair, as Allbritton wanted its stations to be sold together to limit the tax rate that the company would have had to pay from the accrued proceeds, which it estimated would have been substantially higher if the group was sold piecemeal.

On March 20, 2014, as part of a restructuring of the Sinclair-Allbritton deal in order to address these ownership conflicts as well as to expedite the Allbritton acquisition because of them due to the FCC's increased scrutiny of outsourcing agreements used to circumvent in-market ownership caps, Sinclair announced that it would retain ownership of WTTO (choosing to retain the LMA between that station and WDBB, and continue operating it as a satellite station of WTTO), and form a new duopoly between it and WBMA+; WABM was to be sold to a third-party buyer with which Sinclair would not enter into an operational outsourcing arrangement or maintain any contingent interest, other than a possible transitional shared facilities agreement until WTTO was able to move its operations from its longtime home on Beacon Parkway West to WBMA's facility in Hoover.

On May 29, 2014, however, Sinclair informed the FCC that it had not found a buyer for WABM (even among the market's three existing major station owners, WBRC owner Raycom Media, then-WVTM owner Media General and then-WIAT owner LIN Media, neither of which operated an existing duopoly station in the Birmingham market, although the latter two groups were in the process of merging at the time) and proposed surrendering the licenses of WCFT and WJSU to the agency. Under the restructured plan, WBMA's programming would be added to WABM's main channel, which would result in the latter's syndicated and MyNetworkTV programming moving to its second digital channel on 68.2 (WBMA-LD itself, as a low-power station, would not be affected as FCC rules allow the ownership of low-power and full-power stations regardless of market ownership caps for duopolies). Sinclair opted to retain WABM on the basis that its transmission facilities were superior to those of WCFT and WJSU; indeed, moving ABC programming to WABM would give ABC a full-power affiliate in Birmingham itself for the first time since 1996. After nearly a year of delays, Sinclair's deal to acquire Allbritton was approved by the FCC on July 24, 2014, and was completed on August 1, 2014.

=== Sale to Howard Stirk Holdings ===
On September 18, 2014, in preparation for the planned shutdown of WCFT and WJSU eleven days later on September 29, WDBB and WABM both added simulcast feeds of WBMA-LD on their respective second digital subchannels (17.2 and 68.2).

Six days later on September 24, Sinclair filed an application with the FCC to sell the license assets of WCFT to Sinclair's partner company Howard Stirk Holdings (a group owned by conservative political commentator Armstrong Williams) for $50,000. As part of the deal, Sinclair agreed to forego any agreements with HSH to operate the station. Sinclair had reached a similar deal to sell (the original) WCIV in Charleston—another station that was set to be shut down as a result of a similar arrangement involving its MyNetworkTV affiliate in that market, WMMP, due to a grandfathered LMA that station maintained (and subsequently decided to terminate) with Fox affiliate WTAT—to Howard Stirk Holdings.

As a result of the deal, WCFT remained on the air past its scheduled September 29 sign-off date. In addition, as the near-concurrent sale of WJSU-TV to HSH in effect superseded the proposed surrender of its license, Sinclair requested that the FCC hold off on canceling the licenses until at least ten business days after acting on the proposed transaction. In order for Sinclair to continue operating WJSU and WCFT and maintain their existing licenses until the FCC ruled on the petition and the sale to HSH, the two stations began providing interim programming as affiliates of Heartland (which both stations had been carrying on their third digital subchannels as WBMA satellites since the network launched as The Nashville Network on November 1, 2012) on October 20, 2014; at that time, WJSU was essentially converted into a satellite of WCFT. The FCC approved the transfer of license of WCFT-TV and WJSU-TV to Howard Stirk Holdings on December 4, 2014.

On March 11, 2015, Howard Stirk Holdings was granted its application to change the call letters of WCFT to WSES; concurrently, WJSU became WGWW. On October 1, 2015, the station switched its primary affiliation from Heartland to Heroes & Icons.

== Newscasts ==
When the station became an exclusive CBS affiliate in 1970, WSES—as WCFT-TV—established a small news department, with the debut of TV-33 News, featuring story content focusing on Tuscaloosa and west-central Alabama that initially consisted of half-hour newscasts at 6 and 10 p.m. each weeknight. Its newscasts were rebranded Eyewitness News in 1977, a title which continued to be used for the remainder of its tenure as an independently operated station. By the mid-1980s, newscasts were added on weekend evenings; weekday morning and 5 p.m. newscasts debuted on the station during the early 1990s. In sharp contrast to WBMG, WCFT-TV's newscasts were able to gain traction against two of the three established television news competitors from the nearby Birmingham market that existed prior to 1996 whose signals transmitted into the Tuscaloosa market; its newscasts were typically strong performers in the ratings in west-central Alabama for most of the 26-year run of its in-house news department, ranking ahead of WVTM and the Birmingham market's perennial first-place finisher WBRC.

As a result of Allbritton Communications' purchase of the station and subsequent announcement that the group would convert it into a full-power satellite of W58CK upon its assumption of the ABC affiliation, Allbritton announced in the spring of 1996 that it would shut down WCFT's Tuscaloosa-based news department, and convert its Skyland Boulevard studios into a news bureau for W58CK's news department, retaining a limited staff of reporters and photographers to produce story content focused on west-central Alabama that would be included within the latter's newscasts. Channel 33's news department ceased operations and aired its final in-house newscasts on August 31, 1996. W58CK launched its in-house news department the following day on September 1, when WCFT and WJSU were merged into the "ABC 33/40" trimulcast; at that time, WCFT's locally based newscasts were replaced by simulcasts of W58CK/WBMA's morning, midday and evening newscasts. Allbritton transferred certain members of WJSU's news staff to the W58CK/WBMA news department; most notably, main anchor Dave Baird—who remained with the successor news department as lead anchor until retiring in 2017—was among the WCFT staffers that joined the new joint operation.

As a result of the station's sale to Howard Stirk Holdings and Sinclair's decision to move WBMA-LD's programming to a subchannel of WDBB, WCFT-TV discontinued all simulcasts of WBMA's newscasts on September 29, 2014.

=== Notable former on-air staff ===
- Daniel Corbett – meteorologist (1995–1996)
- Rece Davis – general assignment reporter (1987–1990)
- James Spann – part-time meteorologist (1978–1979)

== Technical information ==
=== Subchannels ===
The station's ATSC 1.0 channels are carried on the multiplexed signal of WDBB:

Subchannels provided by WSES (ATSC 1.0)
Subchannel	Res.	Short name	Programming	ATSC 1.0 host
33.1	480i	H & I	Heroes & Icons	WDBB
33.2	480i	Decades	Catchy Comedy	WDBB
33.3	480i	start	Start TV	WDBB

=== Analog-to-digital conversion ===
WCFT-TV shut down its analog signal over UHF channel 33 on June 12, 2009, the official date on which full-power television stations in the United States transitioned from analog to digital broadcasts under federal mandate. The station's digital signal relocated from its pre-transition VHF channel 5 to UHF channel 33 for post-transition operations.

Upon the transition, WCFT relocated its transmitter facilities to a tower near Windham Springs (located 3 miles (4.8 km) east of Alabama State Route 69, near County Road 38/Blue Creek Road); the station's original transmitter tower (located off of Interstates 20 and 59, near the Skyland Boulevard exit) continued in use as the homebase of WBMA+'s Tuscaloosa "TowerLink" camera until the tower was dismantled in early 2013.

=== ATSC 3.0 ===
Subchannels of WSES (ATSC 3.0)
Subchannel	Res.	Short name	Programming
17.1	720p	CW	Independent (WDBB)
17.2	720p	ABC3340	ABC (WBMA-LD)
33.1	720p	H & I	Heroes & Icons
