= WNAL =

WNAL may refer to:

- WNAL-LD, a low-power television station (channel 27) licensed to serve Scottsboro, Alabama, United States
- WWHL-LD, a low-power television station (channel 31, virtual 32) licensed to serve Nashville, Tennessee, United States, which held the call sign WNAL-LP in 2017
- WPXH-TV, a television station (channel 33, virtual 44) licensed to serve Gadsden, Alabama, which held the call sign WNAL-TV from 1984 to 1998
