= WTTO =

Television station in Homewood, Alabama

ATSC 3.0 station
- Homewood–Birmingham, Alabama; United States
- City: Homewood, Alabama
- Channels: Digital: 21 (UHF); Virtual: 21
- Branding: The 205 (pronounced "two oh five")

Programming
- Affiliations: 21.1: Independent; for others, see § Subchannels

Ownership
- Owner: Sinclair Broadcast Group; (WTTO Licensee, LLC)
- Sister stations: WABM, WBMA-LD

History
- Founded: November 6, 1979
- First air date: April 21, 1982
- Former channel numbers: Analog: 21 (UHF, 1982–2009); Digital: 28 (UHF, until 2020)
- Former affiliations: Independent (1982–1990, 1996–1997); Fox (1990–1996); Fox Kids (secondary, 1996–1999); The WB (1997–2006); The CW (2006–2026)
- Call sign meaning: Wonderful Television Twenty-One

Technical information
- Licensing authority: FCC
- Facility ID: 74138
- ERP: 1,000 kW
- HAAT: 422 m (1,385 ft)
- Transmitter coordinates: 33°29′4.8″N 86°48′25.2″W

Links
- Public license information: Public file; LMS
- Website: wtto21.com

WTTO (channel 21), branded as The 205, is an independent television station licensed to Homewood, Alabama, United States, serving the Birmingham area. It is owned by Sinclair Broadcast Group alongside ABC affiliate WBMA-LD (channel 58, branded as ABC 33/40) and fellow independent WABM (channel 68). The stations share studios at the Riverchase office park on Concourse Parkway in Hoover (with a Birmingham mailing address); WTTO's transmitter is located atop Red Mountain in southwestern Birmingham.

In Tuscaloosa, west Alabama, and the western portions of the Birmingham area, WTTO's main channel and two subchannels of WBMA-LD are rebroadcast on WDBB (channel 17), which is licensed to Bessemer. It is owned by Cunningham Broadcasting and managed by Sinclair.

WTTO had a tortuous history prior to starting operations. It took nearly two decades for the station to be approved and built. Once on air, the station was a successful independent for the Birmingham area. It served as the Fox affiliate for the market from 1990 to 1996, when an affiliation shuffle resulted in the loss of the affiliation.

== History ==
=== A long way to air ===
In December 1963, Chapman Radio and Television Company—then the owners of radio station WCRT (1260 AM, now WYDE and 96.5 FM, now WMJJ)—filed an application with the Federal Communications Commission (FCC) to build a new television station in Homewood, using Birmingham's channel 54 allocation. This application was designated for hearing with one by Symphony Network Association, Inc., in 1964. In 1965, the UHF table of allocations was overhauled, and channel 21 was substituted for 54 on Chapman's application. The FCC granted the permit to Chapman in August 1965; however, the FCC chose to resume hearings on the matter after other applicants protested the granting of Chapman's petition. (In the meantime, the Chapmans built, and then sold, WCFT-TV in Tuscaloosa.)

One of the new bidders was a startup station—WBMG (channel 42), the first commercial UHF station in Birmingham—which hoped it could replace channel 42 with 21. When the contest resumed, there were five applicants. Besides Chapman and WBMG, there was Tele-Mac of Birmingham, owned by John McClendon, who also ran a chain of Black-oriented radio stations including WENN in Birmingham; Alabama Television Corporation, owned by John S. Jemison; and Birmingham Broadcasting Company, which was owned by Black businessman A. G. Gaston. Tele-Mac bowed out in late November, leaving four parties seeking the channel.

Hearing examiner James Kraushaar's initial decision, released in September 1968, awarded the channel to Alabama Television, based on its superior technical proposal. However, Chapman and WBMG contested the award, and the FCC agreed, finding that Alabama Television had failed to contact Black people in the process of ascertainment of community needs required of prospective licensees. WBMG's petition also raised a 1969 incident in which a cemetery owned by Jemison refused to bury the body of a Black soldier killed in Vietnam. In 1971, two other Alabama Television shareholders, George J. Mitnick and Joseph Engel, were sued by the United States Department of Justice for violations of the Civil Rights Act of 1968, and the FCC opened new hearings on the firm's qualifications in light of the lawsuit.

Meanwhile, another applicant, Birmingham Broadcasting—which pledged the first integrated TV station in the country—was facing trouble in its ownership group. One of its stakeholders was Oscar Hyde, who was convicted on extortion charges in 1968 but still owned a third of the firm, putting it at a serious disadvantage in comparative hearing until Hyde sold his stake in 1973. WBMG had dropped out by this point, leaving Chapman and Birmingham Broadcasting the lone contenders for the construction permit; the Hyde stake was still being contested, but the FCC found the programming proposals from Chapman inadequate. Furthermore, the two financial institutions that had promised Birmingham Broadcasting funding in 1964 no longer existed in 1976. Hearings were held by the FCC that fall, but one Birmingham Broadcasting stakeholder, Jesse L. Lewis, refused to come; he was serving as the State Highway and Traffic Safety Director, making him the only Black leader of a state agency, and he feared that if he left town, his department would be abolished by the state legislature.

The question of financial backing turned out to be the deciding factor when an administrative law judge found in favor of Chapman's bid in 1977. The decision was appealed to the full FCC, which upheld the ruling in March 1979. An attempted appeal in federal court turned out to have been filed one day late, while a petition for reconsideration made to the FCC was also dismissed.

=== Early years ===
With the permit in hand, construction—and new shareholders—entered the picture. The Chapman brothers sold half of the unbuilt station in 1980 to Byron Lasky, who owned Satellite Television & Associated Resources, a company providing microwave-based subscription television service in Birmingham. The tower was erected alongside studios in the city's Goldencrest neighborhood in early 1982, and on April 21, after more than 18 years, WTTO debuted as Birmingham's fourth commercial TV station, with the first program being Buck Rogers in the 25th Century.

WTTO gave Birmingham its first independent station and Alabama its second, debuting a few weeks after WPMI-TV in Mobile. In 1983, Lasky acquired the remaining half of WTTO from the Chapmans. During this time, the station extended its cable reach, appearing on the system in Anniston in 1985.

Channel 21 was programmed as a typical UHF independent, maintaining a schedule reliant mainly on cartoons, sitcoms and movies. From its sign-on in 1982 until 1985, WTTO also carried programming from the Financial News Network. WTTO quickly became known in the market for airing a broad mix of cult films as part of its film lineup (the station also hosted film festivals at parks throughout central Alabama, featuring public screenings of the movies that it broadcast), as well as spoof promotional campaigns for its programs. WTTO quickly became the strongest independent station in Alabama, and one of the highest-rated independents in the United States. WTTO remained the only independent station in central Alabama for its first two years of operation; however, it would eventually gain a competitor in the west-central part of the state. In 1984, WDBB began broadcasting from Tuscaloosa, and it activated a new transmission facility in 1986 that extended its signal to Birmingham. It was WDBB (and WNAL-TV, a station in Gadsden that primarily rebroadcast it) that served as the market's first Fox affiliate.

In September 1986, HR Broadcasting Company, a unit of HAR Communications, purchased the station along with WCGV-TV in Milwaukee from Byron Lasky's companies. HAR Communications was 20% owned by Hal Roach Studios.

In June 1990, Qintex Entertainment sold its stake in HR Broadcasting Co., which owned WTTO and WCGV, to ABRY Communications for over $40 million. ABRY was successful in winning the Fox affiliation from WDBB, which moved to WTTO on September 1, 1990. As a result of their financial difficulties, WDBB and WNAL began simulcasting WTTO on January 30, 1991. Several stronger WDBB syndicated programs were added to WTTO's schedule as a result. In addition to programming contracts, WTTO also purchased WDBB's Birmingham business offices and W62BG, a translator improving service in parts of the city. The structure of WTTO's relationship with WDBB and WNAL changed to one of an affiliation; the stations also had the ability to air some of their own programming. The three stations functioned as a regional network of their own, providing coverage comparable to WBRC and WVTM-TV.

By 1993, ABRY had purchased WDBB and WNAL outright and converted both stations into full-time satellites of WTTO. WDBB then relocated its transmitter facilities to a tower in Moundville and reduced its transmitter power to reduce overlap with WTTO, but continued to maintain Bessemer as its city of license. That same year, WTTO entered into a local marketing agreement (LMA) with WABM, which had been sold a few months earlier to a locally based group. By 1994, WTTO had become one of the highest-rated Fox affiliates in the country, and managed to overtake CBS affiliate WBMG as the third-highest-rated television station in central Alabama. Late that year, both WDBB and WNAL began airing separate programming during the daytime and late evening hours, consisting of syndicated sitcoms, drama and animated series that WTTO did not hold the rights to broadcast as well as local newscasts.

In 1994, ABRY Communications merged with Sinclair Broadcast Group, which—in addition to acquiring WTTO and WDBB—also assumed the rights to the LMA with WABM. At that time, the station moved its operations into WABM's facilities on Beacon Parkway West. In 1995, WNAL was purchased by Fant Broadcasting, but it continued to simulcast WTTO's programming through a time brokerage agreement.

=== Disaffiliation from Fox and eventual switch to The WB ===
On May 5, 1994, Great American Communications (which would be renamed Citicasters following the completion of its debt restructuring later that year) agreed to sell WBRC and three of its sister stations—fellow ABC affiliate WGHP in High Point, North Carolina, NBC affiliate WDAF-TV in Kansas City and CBS affiliate KSAZ-TV in Phoenix—to New World Communications for $350 million in cash and $10 million in share warrants. As part of a broader deal between New World and Fox signed on May 23 of that year, New World agreed to affiliate five of its eight existing television stations and the four it had acquired from Great American with Fox, in a series of affiliation transactions that would take two years to complete due to the varying conclusion dates of their ongoing contracts with either ABC, NBC or CBS. WBRC was one of the stations involved in this agreement. Although WTTO had established itself as one of the network's strongest affiliates, Fox jumped at the chance to align with WBRC, which had been the dominant station in central Alabama for over three decades.

Three weeks later, New World agreed to buy WVTM-TV and three other stations—CBS affiliates KDFW in Dallas–Fort Worth and KTBC in Austin, and ABC affiliate KTVI in St. Louis—from Argyle Television Holdings, in a purchase option-structured deal worth $717 million. The two purchases created a problem for New World due to conflicts caused by restrictions on television station ownership imposed by the FCC at the time; New World was not permitted to retain both WBRC and WVTM in any event as the ownership of two television stations in the same market by a single company was prohibited, and the concurrent acquisitions would give New World ownership of a combined fifteen stations, three more than the FCC allowed. The group's affiliation deal with Fox allowed New World to solve its ownership conflicts in Birmingham, as it chose to establish and transfer the license of WBRC into a trust company with the intent to sell the station to the network's broadcasting subsidiary, Fox Television Stations; the trust transfer was completed on July 24, 1995.

Although the transfer of WBRC to the trust was finalized on July 24, 1995, Fox could not switch WBRC's network affiliation in the short-term, as the station's contract with ABC would not expire until August 31, 1996. While this forced Fox Television Stations to operate WBRC as an ABC affiliate for 8½ months after its purchase of the station from the New World-established trust closed on January 17, 1996, creating the rare situation in which a station was run by the owned-and-operated station group of one network but maintained an affiliation with one of its competitors, it gave ABC enough time to find a new central Alabama affiliate. The network first approached WTTO for an affiliation agreement. However, Sinclair—which would not own any stations affiliated with either of the Big Three networks until it acquired River City Broadcasting in 1996—was only willing to carry ABC's prime time and news programming, as it was not interested in carrying the network's then-languishing daytime and Saturday morning programs. Even though WDBB operated a news department at the time negotiations with ABC began, Sinclair was also not willing to start a news department for WTTO; the group did not allocate a budget for news production for its non-Big Three stations at the time.

Unlike situations in St. Louis and the Piedmont Triad, where the network had little other choice but to align with a Sinclair-owned station (or one that the group would later acquire) due to a lack of another financially secure full-power station, other options were available in the Birmingham market. After turning down the WTTO offer in late 1995, ABC reached an agreement with Allbritton Communications to affiliate with WCFT in November of that year; Allbritton planned to acquire the non-license assets of WNAL-TV under a local marketing agreement and convert it into a satellite of WCFT-TV. Allbritton would later terminate the proposed LMA with WNAL and entered into an LMA with Osborne Communications Corporation to take over the operations of WJSU-TV; it also purchased low-power independent station W58CK (channel 58, now WBMA-LD) to serve as the official ABC affiliate for central Alabama for the purpose of being counted in the Birmingham station ratings reports (as Nielsen designated Tuscaloosa and Anniston as separate markets at the time), with WCFT and WJSU serving as its satellites; this prompted Allbritton to sign a groupwide affiliation deal with ABC which renewed the network's affiliations with its stations in Little Rock, Tulsa, Harrisburg, Roanoke, and Washington, D.C. and caused the company's stations in Charleston and Brunswick, Georgia to switch to the network.

On September 1, 1996, when WBRC-TV officially became a Fox owned-and-operated station and W58CK/WCFT/WJSU became an ABC affiliate, WTTO and WDBB reverted to operating as independent stations. Simultaneously, WNAL formally terminated the WTTO simulcast, and became the CBS affiliate for Gadsden and northeastern Alabama. WBRC originally planned to carry the entire Fox network schedule, running the Fox Kids block on weekday afternoons to replace the displaced ABC soap opera lineup upon its move to the W58CK trimulcast (which would be collectively known as "ABC 33/40", a brand referencing the respective channel numbers of WCFT and WJSU, and will mostly be referred to hereafter in the article as "WBMA+"). However, in what would be the catalyst to a change in the carriage policies for Fox Kids that allowed stations the option of either airing the block or being granted the right to transfer the rights to another station in the market, Sinclair approached WBRC about allowing WTTO to retain Fox Kids, which the Fox network (on behalf of Fox Television Stations) allowed it to keep.

On January 27, 1997, WTTO and WDBB became affiliates of The WB Television Network, and changed its on-air branding to "WB 21". It was one of the first Sinclair stations to affiliate with the network, occurring six months before the group struck an agreement to affiliate most of its UPN-affiliated and independent stations that it either owned or controlled to The WB on July 21. Prior to that point, Birmingham had been one of the largest markets that was not served by a local WB affiliate; central Alabama residents were only able to receive WB programs on satellite and some cable providers through the national superstation feed of the network's Chicago affiliate, WGN-TV (now also a CW affiliate; its cable feed now operates as a standalone channel), which carried the network's programming nationwide from The WB's launch in January 1995 until October 1999.

With the WB affiliation, WTTO added one of Fox Kids' competitors, Kids' WB, to its inventory of children's programming. The station carried Kids' WB's weekday morning and afternoon blocks together on Monday through Friday mornings (bookending Fox Kids' weekday morning block) on either a one-day delay or live-to-air depending on the time slot and accordant block; the Saturday morning edition of the block, meanwhile, aired on Sundays in a day-behind arrangement as WTTO aired the Fox Kids weekend block on Saturdays. During the late 1990s, WTTO reduced the number of movies, classic sitcoms and cartoons on its schedule, and began shifting its syndicated programming towards a lineup of talk, reality and court shows as well as more recent syndicated sitcoms, that would become the common variety of programming for netlet stations at that time.

In early 2000, WDBB relocated its transmitter facilities back to its original 609.6-meter (2,000 ft) guyed-mast transmission tower in Windham Springs (which was constructed and completed shortly before the station signed on in 1982). WTTO dropped the Fox Kids block back in September 1999, at which time, the station moved the Kids' WB blocks to weekday afternoons and Saturday mornings. Neither WBRC, nor any other central Alabama station, chose to acquire the local rights to Fox's children's programming lineup; as a result, Fox Kids, as well as the successor blocks that 4Kids Entertainment programmed for the network after 2002 (Fox Box and 4Kids TV), were not cleared in the Birmingham market for the 7 1/2 years that the network continued to carry children's programming; in addition, WTTO (as with WBRC) declined to air the paid programming block that replaced 4Kids TV in January 2009, Weekend Marketplace; it would air instead on WABM. WTTO has continued to air the Saturday morning program blocks carried by The WB, and later by The CW (Kids' WB, The CW4Kids/Toonzai, Vortexx and One Magnificent Morning), without interruption through the years. In 2001, Sinclair purchased WABM outright, creating the Birmingham–Tuscaloosa–Anniston market's first television duopoly with WTTO/WDBB.

=== CW affiliation ===
On January 24, 2006, the Warner Bros. Entertainment unit of Time Warner (which operated The WB) and CBS Corporation (which acquired UPN through its split from Viacom in December 2005) announced that the two companies would respectively shut down UPN and The WB, and enter into a joint venture to form a new "fifth" broadcast television network, The CW, that would initially feature a mix of programming from both of its forerunner networks as well as new content developed specifically for The CW. WTTO, however, continued to show The WB's programming until the network's closure on September 17, 2006. On May 2, 2006, Sinclair Broadcast Group announced that it had signed an affiliation agreement with the network, in which WTTO would become the Birmingham charter affiliate of The CW; when it officially joined the network upon its debut on September 18, WTTO/WDBB adopted "CW 21" as its official branding (although, the station sometimes identifies as "CW 21 Alabama" in some promotional imaging); sister station WABM affiliated with MyNetworkTV, a new secondary service started by Fox, on September 5, 2006.

In 2007, Sinclair sold WDBB to Cunningham Broadcasting, and entered into a time brokerage agreement to continue operating that station as its repeater. However, the sale itself was purely nominal, as 97% of Cunningham's stock is controlled by trusts owned by the family of now-deceased Sinclair founder Julian Sinclair Smith (including, among others, its current chief executive officer David Smith). Since the late 1990s, when it was known as Glencairn, Ltd., Cunningham has long faced allegations that it merely acts a shell corporation to circumvent FCC rules on television station ownership within a single market.

WTTO remained the market's CW affiliate until September 1, 2026, when WIAT (itself displaced from CBS when Nexstar disaffiliated and Hearst-owned WVTM-TV became the new affiliate) replaced it. At that point, WTTO became independent, branding as "The 205" after Birmingham's primary area code. Like sister station KDNL in St. Louis, WTTO now broadcasts syndicated programs and Sinclair's The National News Desk.

==== Secondary ABC affiliation ====
On July 29, 2013, Allbritton Communications announced that it would sell its seven television stations—including the trimulcast operation involving WBMA-LD and satellites WCFT-TV and WJSU-TV—to Sinclair Broadcast Group (which would purchase the stations for $985 million), in order to focus on running its co-owned political news website, Politico. As part of the deal, Sinclair had intended to sell the license assets of WTTO and WABM to Deerfield Media, and retain operational responsibilities for those stations through shared services and joint sales agreements.

On December 6, 2013, the FCC informed Sinclair that applications related to the deal needed to be "amended or withdrawn", as Sinclair would retain the existing time brokerage agreement between WTTO and WDBB; this would, in effect, create a new LMA between WBMA+ and WDBB, even though the commission had ruled in 1999 that such agreements made after November 5, 1996, covering the programming of more than 15% of a station's broadcast day would count toward the ownership limits for the brokering station's owner. On March 20, 2014, as part of a restructuring of the Sinclair-Allbritton deal in order to address these ownership conflicts as well as to expedite approval of the Allbritton acquisition that was delayed due to the FCC's increased scrutiny of outsourcing agreements (such as those maintained by Sinclair) used to circumvent in-market ownership caps, Sinclair announced that it would retain ownership of WTTO (under which WDBB would continue operating as its satellite under the existing LMA), and form a new duopoly between it and WBMA+ (which would mark the first known instance in which the senior partner in one duopoly became the junior partner in another, as well as the first instance involving a duopoly that was broken up legally terminating all operational ties with the junior partner); WABM was to be sold to a third-party buyer with which Sinclair would not enter into an operational outsourcing arrangement or maintain any contingent interest, other than a possible transitional shared facilities agreement until WTTO was able to move its operations from its Beacon Parkway studios to WBMA's facility in Hoover.

On May 29, 2014, after informing the FCC that it had not found a buyer for WABM (even among the respective owners of WBRC, WVTM and WIAT that did not operate an existing duopoly in Birmingham, Raycom Media, Media General and LIN Media, the latter two of which were in the process of merging at the time), Sinclair stated that it would propose a surrendering of the WJSU and WCFT licenses, and migrate the WBMA simulcast to WABM's second digital subchannel on the basis that the latter's transmission facilities are superior to those of WCFT and WJSU (as a low-power station, WBMA-LD would not be affected as the FCC does not apply in-market ownership caps to low-power stations owned alongside any full-power station). After nearly a year of delays, Sinclair's acquisition of Allbritton was approved by the FCC on July 24, 2014, and completed one week later on August 1.

On September 11, 2014, in preparation for the planned shutdown of WCFT and WJSU eighteen days later on September 29 (the transaction would be suspended on Sinclair's asking by the FCC days prior to the shutdown after the group agreed to sell both stations to Howard Stirk Holdings, on the agreement that Sinclair would not enter into any operational arrangements with HSH for either station), WDBB added a simulcast feed of WBMA-LD on digital subchannel 17.2, replacing WCFT (which became a Heartland affiliate) as WBMA's Tuscaloosa repeater; WABM also added a simulcast of the WBMA on its 68.2 subchannel.

== Newscasts ==
WTTO launched its own in-house news operation on September 8, 2003, and began airing a nightly hour-long prime time newscast, titled WB21 News at 9:00. The program was developed and formatted around the News Central local/national hybrid news concept created by Sinclair that year; local news segments originated from the station's Beacon Parkway studios in Birmingham, while national news, weather and sports segments were based out of studios located at Sinclair's corporate headquarters on Beaver Dam Road in Hunt Valley, Maryland. In addition, WTTO also aired "The Point", a controversial one-minute conservative political commentary feature during its newscasts; the segment was required to air on all Sinclair-owned stations that aired local newscasts (regardless of whether it carried the News Central format or not).

=== Outsourcing to WIAT ===
The WB21 News at 9:00 was unable to make headway against WBRC's longer-established (and much higher-rated) 9 p.m. newscast, which debuted in September 1996 upon its switch to Fox; as a result, WTTO outsourced production of its evening newscast to CBS affiliate WIAT through a news share agreement in October 2005. The WIAT-produced newscast was canceled on October 13, 2006, due to low ratings; the News Central format had earlier been phased out entirely in its other markets by March 2006.

== Technical information ==
=== Subchannels ===
The station's ATSC 1.0 channels are carried on the multiplexed signals of other Birmingham television stations:

Subchannels provided by WTTO (ATSC 1.0)
Subchannel	Res.	Short name	Programming	ATSC 1.0 host
21.1	720p	WTTO	Main WTTO programming	WIAT
21.2	480i	Antenna	Antenna TV (4:3)	WABM
21.3	480i	COMET	Comet	WVTM-TV
21.4	480i	ROAR	Roar	WBRC

=== Analog-to-digital conversion ===
On February 2, 2009, Sinclair Broadcast Group announced in an e-mail release to all cable and satellite television providers carrying its television stations that, regardless of the exact date of the mandatory switchover to digital-only broadcasting for full-power stations (which Congress rescheduled days later to June 12), its stations (including WABM) would shut down their analog signals on the originally scheduled transition date of February 17.

WTTO and WDBB ended regular programming on their analog signals, respectively over UHF channels 21 and 17, at 11:59 p.m. on that date. WTTO's digital signal remained on its pre-transition UHF channel 28, using virtual channel 21. WDBB also continued to operate its digital signal on its pre-transition digital channel, UHF 18, using virtual channel 17. As part of the SAFER Act, WTTO and WDBB kept their analog signal on the air until March 19 to inform viewers of the digital television transition through a loop of public service announcements from the National Association of Broadcasters.

With the digital conversion, WTTO moved its transmitter facilities from its analog transmitter site 3 miles (4.8 km) east on Red Mountain to a digital transmitter overlooking the Goldencrest neighborhood, that it shares with radio stations WZZK (104.7 FM) and WBPT (106.9 FM). The move and the resulting expansion of its coverage area, resulted in the shutdown of W62BG as the main signal provided adequate coverage of the entire Birmingham area; the translator's license was canceled in late October 2011.

=== ATSC 3.0 ===
Subchannels of WTTO (ATSC 3.0)
Subchannel	Res.	Short name	Programming
6.1	720p	WBRC	Fox (WBRC)
13.1	1080p	WVTM	NBC (WVTM-TV)
21.1	720p	WTTO	Main WTTO programming
21.10	1080p	T2	T2
21.11	1080p	PBTV	Pickleballtv
21.20		GMLOOP	GameLoop
21.21		ROXi	ROXi
42.1	1080p	WIAT	The CW (WIAT)
68.2	720p	ABC3340	ABC (WBMA-LD)

Subchannel broadcast with digital rights management
Subchannel streamed via the Internet

== See also ==
- Tallest structures in the U.S.
