= WIAT =

Television station in Birmingham, Alabama

- Birmingham–Tuscaloosa–; Anniston, Alabama; United States
- City: Birmingham, Alabama
- Channels: Digital: 30 (UHF); Virtual: 42
- Branding: Alabama's 42

Programming
- Affiliations: 42.1: The CW; for others, see § Subchannels

Ownership
- Owner: Nexstar Media Group; (Nexstar Media Inc.)

History
- First air date: October 17, 1965
- Former call signs: WBMG (1965–1998)
- Former channel numbers: Analog: 42 (UHF, 1965–2009)
- Former affiliations: NBC (non-primary, 1965–1970); CBS (non-primary, 1965–1970; primary, 1970–2026); Independent (August 2026)
- Call sign meaning: "It's About Time", station slogan at 1998 relaunch

Technical information
- Licensing authority: FCC
- Facility ID: 5360
- ERP: 1,000 kW
- HAAT: 426 m (1,398 ft)
- Transmitter coordinates: 33°29′4.5″N 86°48′25.4″W

Links
- Public license information: Public file; LMS
- Website: www.alabamas42.com

WIAT (channel 42), branded as Alabama's 42, is a television station in Birmingham, Alabama, United States, serving as the market's outlet for The CW. Owned by Nexstar Media Group, the station maintains studios and transmitter facilities on Golden Crest Drive atop Red Mountain.

Channel 42 in Birmingham went on the air as WBMG on October 17, 1965, nearly nine years after its construction was approved. It was the city's third commercial station after channels 6 and 13 (now WBRC and WVTM-TV), whose very high frequency (VHF) signals carried further than WBMG's ultra high frequency (UHF) signal; the Birmingham Television Corporation, which built channel 42, had been unsuccessful in efforts to allocate a third VHF TV channel to Birmingham. The station initially aired the CBS and NBC programs not aired by channel 13 until the two stations each took full-time network affiliations in 1970. It was hemmed in by its weaker signal, the existence of CBS affiliates in Tuscaloosa and Anniston, and the dominance of the VHF stations in the ratings. Roy H. Park Broadcasting acquired WBMG in 1973, but WBMG never moved above third in the market. In response to low ratings, the station dropped local news in 1982 and restored it in 1987; the newscasts, titled Action News Birmingham, became known for a combative style and emphasis on metro-area news, but they were never highly viewed. By 1997, syndicated reruns of Sanford and Son attracted more viewers than WBMG's evening news, and a new Birmingham TV station pushed channel 42 into fourth place in news.

When Media General acquired the Park group in 1997, it planned a major overhaul of the long-struggling station. General manager Eric Land fired all of WBMG's on-air presenters as well as other news employees in December 1997. For a month, channel 42 aired a countdown clock at 5 and 10 p.m. while the news department was rebuilt from scratch, a tactic that attracted national attention. On February 5, 1998, the station changed its call letters to WIAT—for its new slogan, "It's About Time"—and relaunched its newscasts as 42 Daily News. The news programs featured short stories, no on-camera reporters, and a high story count; while still in fourth place, they were a marked improvement in quality and ratings over their predecessors. After ratings plateaued in the early 2000s, the station moved to a more conventional format and brought in veteran Birmingham news personalities, which made channel 42 more competitive in the market.

Media General acquired WVTM-TV in 2006 and sold WIAT to New Vision Television to make the purchase. LIN Media acquired New Vision in 2012, and Media General acquired LIN in 2014—this time, keeping WIAT and selling WVTM. Nexstar purchased Media General in 2017. On August 1, 2026, the station lost its CBS affiliation to WVTM, and it picked up CW programming from WTTO the following month.

== Pre-launch ==
In March 1956, the Birmingham Television Corporation—formed by Harry and Elmer Balaban—was incorporated in Alabama and proceeded to file for Birmingham's unused ultra high frequency (UHF) channel 42. That same month, Birmingham radio station WSGN filed for channel 42 as well. It was the second application for television made by WSGN, which had previously sought channel 48 and was an ABC affiliate in radio. The fact that two applicants were seeking a UHF channel was of note given that UHF television had proved mostly an economic failure due to lack of transmitter power and the inability of many sets to tune UHF stations.

WSGN's owners, the Winston-Salem Broadcasting Company, withdrew their application for channel 42 on November 28, 1956. The withdrawal was part of a consolidation with the Balaban application, which was approved. Of the prospects for a new station, which would likely have been an ABC affiliate at that point in time, Roger Thames of The Birmingham News wrote,

Personally, I don't believe anybody's going to establish a UHF station in Birmingham. I don't believe there are very many sets in use here which will bring in the UHF signal. And UHF operators elsewhere have had little luck in persuading folks to spend money to gear their sets to get UHF. But ... it costs money to keep an application alive, and something must be in the air.

The Birmingham Television Corporation spent years trying to move a third commercial channel in the more established very high frequency (VHF) band to Birmingham. In the late 1950s and early 1960s, the FCC considered adding such a channel to Birmingham on multiple occasions. In 1959, it considered moving channel 8 into Birmingham; WBMG favored a proposal to relocate channel 4 from Columbus, Mississippi, which was also denied. In 1963, it opted to deny the addition of channel 3. The pending proceedings spared the unbuilt station, with the call sign WBMG, from deletion. In 1960, the FCC sent letters to the permittees of 54 unused or unbuilt UHF stations, including WBMG, ordering them to resume or lose the permit. WBMG and a permit in Grand Rapids, Michigan, were spared due to the pending proposals. In 1963, Winston-Salem Broadcasting became the sole owner of the Birmingham Television Corporation when it bought out the Balabans' stake.

== Construction and early years ==
In November 1964, Winston-Salem Broadcasting filed to sell a two-thirds stake to four investors: William P. Dubois, Enterprise Funds Inc., Northwest Growth Fund Inc., and Exchange Capitol Corporation. The FCC approved this transaction in March 1965. With the new ownership, plans were set in motion to construct WBMG, with Dubois as general manager. Even at this juncture, the station attempted to improve its position by filing for the lower channel 21.

WBMG began broadcasting on October 17, 1965. The quarters it occupied on Red Mountain had belonged to radio station WJLD and were designed to accommodate a television operation. WBMG did not hold a primary network affiliation at launch. WAPI-TV (channel 13) held the primary affiliations with CBS and NBC in central Alabama, and not all of their programming was seen in Birmingham as a result; channel 42 filled this gap by airing the network shows not aired on channel 13. This was illustrated in its first day of programming: the inaugural program was an NBC News special, but later in the evening the station aired The Ed Sullivan Show from CBS. Likewise, WBMG aired the CBS Evening News with Walter Cronkite and NBC's The Tonight Show Starring Johnny Carson on weeknights. Carson had gone unseen in Birmingham for several years. Because WAPI-TV had first-call rights on the networks' programs, series moved between the stations, sometimes in the middle of the television season.

The station broadcast with an effective radiated power of 479,000 watts until 1969, when it activated a new, 894-foot (272 m) tower and increased its power to over a million watts. The new tower was boasted to increase the station's signal in areas from Anniston and Gadsden in the east to Tuscaloosa in the west. By this time, Tuscaloosa and Anniston each had their own stations: Tuscaloosa's WCFT (channel 33) debuted in October 1965, while Anniston's WHMA-TV (channel 40) started in October 1969. This situation persisted until May 31, 1970, when WAPI-TV became the sole NBC affiliate under a new agreement with NBC and WBMG the sole CBS affiliate. Likewise, WCFT and WHMA-TV became full-time CBS affiliates.

In 1971, WBMG moved into larger studios on Red Mountain.

== Park Broadcasting ownership ==
Park Broadcasting, the radio and television enterprise of Roy H. Park, acquired WBMG in 1973, bringing its station group up to the then-limit of seven outlets. Park continued to make capital investments in channel 42 in spite of its reduced coverage area, including new video tape equipment, electronic news gathering, and a new antenna. However, these changes did not fully help WBMG, whose signal could not fully penetrate the hilly Central Alabama terrain.

The station produced a number of local programs; these included a public affairs series (Spectrum), live studio wrestling, a weekly church service, and annual coverage of Birmingham's Veterans Day parade. In the late 1960s and 1970s, channel 42 offered Sgt. Jack, a children's show hosted by Birmingham disc jockey Neal Miller. Its studios were the home to the first programs produced by Mother Angelica, founder of the Eternal Word Television Network (EWTN); she severed her relationship with WBMG in 1981 when it aired a CBS miniseries based on the 1972 novel The Word, which she believed presented Jesus as a fake.

While WBMG debuted a local newscast when it signed on in 1965, its news efforts were generally minimal. One of its first employees was Bill Bolen, who had worked at WSGN radio and later left to spend 41 years at WBRC; he recalled channel 42 as "primitive". By 1977, the news staff numbered four people, while WBRC and WAPI-TV each had 20 or more employees in their news departments. Few people watched. In 1981, WBMG's 6 p.m. newscast attracted six percent of the audience at that hour to 49 percent for WBRC and 33 percent for the recently renamed WVTM-TV, and the station had no newscast at 10 p.m. General manager Hoyle Broome touted the straightforward format of his newscast as an alternative. The newscast, known as Metro News, was then moved to 5 p.m. in hopes of attracting an audience as the first newscast of the evening; WVTM dashed those hopes by debuting a 5 p.m. newscast of its own, prompting station officials to reevaluate. In March 1982, the newscast was replaced with short news updates during daytime and evening programming, and the news staff was reduced from five employees to two. The station did not air local newscasts for the next several years; Park instead invested in a new, taller tower and higher-power transmitter facility for WBMG, which were activated in 1983 and 1984, respectively.

=== Action News Birmingham ===
In late 1986, WBMG began readying a return to local news production, prompting Tuscaloosa-based WDBB to cancel its low-rated 9 p.m. local newscast. Park invested $1.5 million to start WBMG Action News Birmingham, which debuted on January 12, 1987. The news department, with weeknight 5 and 10 p.m. newscasts as well as weekend editions, focused on news in the five-county Birmingham metro area, rather than the much larger news coverage areas of WBRC and WVTM; the goal was not to be number one but merely to occupy a niche. News director Frank Morock believed the expanding focuses of the other stations left Birmingham and its environs relatively underserved. News viewership for Action News Birmingham hovered between five and nine percent of the audience, a far cry from the shares of 30 percent or above commanded by each of WBRC and WVTM. The newscasts were losing in the ratings to syndicated reruns on Birmingham's independent station, WTTO, though station management contended and a coincidental telephone survey found that viewership was higher than reflected in ratings diaries.

John Herrod left KTXS-TV in Sweetwater, Texas, to become WBMG's news director in 1990. He sought to give the station a defined news image by airing longer, more in-depth stories. Channel 42 also became known for aggressive reporting. When WBRC anchor Janet Hall became a spokeswoman for the Birmingham Zoo, WBMG produced a news special openly asking whether WBRC could be considered a reliable source for reporting on the troubled facility. Doors being slammed in WBMG reporters' faces became a common sight on channel 42's newscasts, and the station did a series of reports on why Birmingham city officials were not talking to WBMG. Even though WBMG's news audience consisted of one to two percent of the market, a study by researchers at the University of Alabama at Birmingham (UAB) found that WBMG's Action News aired more local news stories and longer stories than its higher-rated competitors in one week in April 1994, concluding, "Channel 42 was guilty of some editorializing but clearly offered more substance than the other two stations."

=== Shifting affiliations elsewhere, shifting ownership at Park ===
In 1994, Park Communications (Note: Park Broadcasting renamed itself by 1983.) sold itself to Donald R. Tomlin and Gary B. Knapp in a deal backed by the Retirement Systems of Alabama pension fund. The sale of Park led to the end of Herrod's Action News format and combative approach in favor of a more mainstream news presentation with the same amount of crime news as other local stations. A new news director was hired in late 1995; the station initiated new weekend, morning, and 5 p.m. newscasts in 1996; and the newsroom was expanded from 1,500 square feet (140 m^{2}) to 3,900 square feet (360 m^{2}).

Meanwhile, a major realignment of television station affiliations and ownership was brewing in the market. In May 1994, New World Communications agreed to affiliate 12 stations with Fox, including ABC affiliate WBRC-TV, which it had just agreed to buy from Citicasters. At the same time, New World agreed to buy Argyle Television, owner of NBC affiliate WVTM-TV; to resolve the conflict, WBRC-TV was sold directly to the Fox network. This deal set off a slow-motion affiliation shuffle in Birmingham as ABC sought a replacement affiliate. ABC negotiated with WBMG and was even reported to be near a deal. Instead, Park Communications signed a long-term renewal with CBS, owing to its upcoming deal to carry Southeastern Conference college sports and the company's lengthy relationship with the network.

As a replacement, ABC persuaded the CBS affiliates in Tuscaloosa and Anniston, WCFT and WJSU, to switch affiliations. They would act as full-power satellites of a low-power station in Birmingham, WBMA-LP, with a new combined news operation in Birmingham. The new station, which debuted in September 1996 under the moniker "ABC 33/40", featured veteran Alabama news personalities including WBRC's James Spann and Brenda Ladun, later poaching anchor Pam Huff from WVTM. The newscasts on WBMA immediately rose to third place in the Birmingham ratings, pushing channel 42 to fourth place. Nielsen Media Research, which measures television ratings, proceeded to announce that it would fold Tuscaloosa and Anniston into the Birmingham Designated Market Area as a result of their local stations being merged with WBMA; in addition, it would introduce meters instead of diaries to the enlarged market.

== "It's About Time": Media General acquisition and relaunch as WIAT ==
=== New ownership and management ===
Media General, a broadcaster and publisher based in Richmond, Virginia, announced it would purchase Park Communications in July 1996, creating a company focused on media holdings in the Southeast. The company assumed ownership of WBMG in January 1997 and fired 17-year general manager Hoyle Broome in March. His replacement was Eric Land, who arrived from WGRZ in Buffalo, New York. Among Land's first moves was simulcasting WBMG's newscasts on WNAL in Gadsden, which had replaced WJSU as the CBS affiliate in the eastern portion of the state. The station also ended its longtime relationship with UAB athletics; Broome, a noted booster, was known for preempting CBS prime time programming for sports.

Land's priority was to fix the news department; he had previously overseen major overhauls at WGRZ and at WEYI-TV in Saginaw, Michigan. The station's newscasts had sunk below The Andy Griffith Show on WTTO and Sanford and Son on WABM in the ratings, and they were so poor that not even the anchors' parents watched, Land later recalled. Speculation of a major shakeup was fed by a major research project as well as the resignations of several senior managers over the course of 1997.

The countdown clock that WBMG aired instead of local news from January 1 to February 5, 1998

On December 11, 1997, WBMG fired all of its on-air anchors and reporters as well as other news staffers, a total of 21 people, effective December 31. Land declared, "We just cannot continue to offer a traditional newscast. That's already being done in this market." The station's employees had expected Land to make significant changes. While lead weeknight anchorman Chris Schauble told the Birmingham Post-Herald that he had known as early as Thanksgiving that he was going to be fired, many other staffers did not know exactly what would take place until the firings were announced. A day before the final newscast, on December 31, Land announced that it would be replaced with a clock counting down to the debut of a new newscast on February 5, coinciding with the start of the 1998 Winter Olympics, which aired on CBS; he joked, "More people will probably watch the clock than watched the news broadcast anyway." The story attracted attention well beyond Birmingham; Mark Lorando in the New Orleans Times-Picayune compared Land's mass firing to the series finale of The Mary Tyler Moore Show, in which nearly every news staffer was fired. During this time, the news department was reconstructed with input from focus groups and market research. The newsroom also kept functioning; the station sent coverage of the January 29 bombing of the New Woman All Women Clinic in Birmingham's Southside neighborhood by Eric Rudolph to CBS Newspath, CNN, and stations in neighboring markets, even though it was not airing a newscast.

=== Launch of 42 Daily News ===
The reason we did [the call sign change] was because the perception of WBMG was so bad and the news produced was so bad. We had to make a clear break. ... That included changing the call letters.

— Micah Johnson, WIAT news manager

On that date, at 5 p.m., viewers saw Land push a plunger to blow up the WBMG logo before an audience of Birmingham community leaders. The station changed its call sign to WIAT, (Note: While announced on February 5, the change was made in FCC databases on February 1.) for "It's About Time", the slogan of the station's new 42 Daily News newscasts, which aired at 5 and 10 p.m. The Daily News format eschewed on-camera reporters; stories were packaged into topical minute segments such as "Alabama Minute" and "Education Minute". The format earned comparisons to CNN Headline News from Keith Cate, who came from WMAR-TV in Baltimore to serve as lead co-anchor, and an article in the Birmingham Post-Herald. One anchor occupied the news desk, while the other read stories from various places on the new set. The 2-Minute Drill sportscast was provided by Paul Finebaum, a Post-Herald columnist and radio show host on WERC; the sportscast in the 5 p.m. newscast aired live on TV and radio. The other weeknight news presenters, like Cate, came from out of the market: Sherri Jackson was hired from WSAZ-TV in Huntington, West Virginia, while Declan Cannon had worked at The Weather Channel. Al Primo, who created the Eyewitness News format at KYW-TV in Philadelphia in 1965, delivered sharp criticism of what he felt was "a product that was generated solely by research and implemented by people who don't know anything about the news business" and "the most disjointed presentation [of a newscast] that I have ever seen in my life". Land responded to Primo's scathing remarks by comparing the format to the Al Schottelkotte News, a longtime staple of WCPO-TV in Cincinnati from the 1960s until 1990, for which he had been a reporter: "[The Al Schottelkotte News] was very nontraditional, but jam-packed with information."

42 Daily News represented an immediate ratings improvement over its predecessor; the 10 p.m. newscast, in particular, had increased from a paltry 3% share in February 1997 to a 7% share in February 1998, partly due to having the Winter Olympics as a lead-in. This was not enough to overtake any competitors, but it was higher than the last newscasts as WBMG. Ratings also increased once Birmingham became a metered market, moving to 3 and 4 shares on most nights early in the fall of 1998, and continued their steady climb in early 1999.

Some of the firings resulted in legal action against channel 42. Seven Black former employees sued the station for racial discrimination in 1999, alleging they had been fired for their race and that White employees had been treated better; Media General prevailed in multiple state and federal cases. Doug Bell, the station's sports director since 1988, and former general manager Broome each sued Media General for breach of contract.

The WIAT relaunch did not include a morning newscast, which WBMG had debuted prior to 1997. The station did not begin airing a local morning show until 2000, when it began simulcasting an hour of the morning show hosted by Russ and Dee Fine on WYDE radio. The station added a 6 p.m. evening newscast the next year. Land departed in 2001 when Media General tapped him to run WFLA-TV in Tampa, Florida, the company's flagship television property; he reunited with Cate, who had joined the WFLA news staff the year before. Finebaum left in May 2002 after a run of more than four years with channel 42; WIAT began broadcasting a digital signal, including high-definition programming, on November 20 of that year.

Ratings growth leveled off after several years of the 42 Daily News format, and viewing figures remained flat between 2000 and 2003. While the reporter-less format cost the station less—the WIAT news department had 25 employees in 2003, compared to 70 at WBRC—it was not prospering against more traditional news competition and with a lack of recognizable faces.

Beginning in 2005, WIAT produced a 9 p.m. newscast for WTTO, at that time the market's affiliate of The WB. The new WIAT production replaced WTTO's News Central hybrid newscast and required the expansion of channel 42's news staff.

== Since 2006 ==
=== Sale to New Vision Television ===
In 2006, Media General announced it would acquire a package of four smaller-market NBC stations owned by the network, which included WVTM. Media General opted to keep WVTM because its signal reached more households; it also was third in the market in revenue compared to WIAT in fourth. The company put four of its stations up for sale, including WIAT, to finance the purchase and meet ownership limits in the Birmingham market. WIAT and KIMT in Mason City, Iowa, were sold to Atlanta-based New Vision Television in a deal announced in August and completed in October 2006.

After the sale, WIAT cemented itself as the number-three station in ratings. It debuted a full-fledged morning newscast in September 2007, and it began attracting noted news personalities under general manager Bill Ballard, who ran the station from 2003 to 2013. Herb Winches, a veteran Birmingham sportscaster for WBRC and WVTM, worked at channel 42 from 2007 to 2008 before being replaced by Jim Dunaway, a 15-year veteran of WVTM and sports talk radio host. The station also hired other longtime news presenters in Birmingham, including Ken Lass, Mark Prater, and David Neal.

WIAT shut down its analog signal, over UHF channel 42, on June 12, 2009, the official date on which full-power television stations in the United States transitioned from analog to digital broadcasts under federal mandate. The station's digital signal remained on its pre-transition UHF channel 30, using virtual channel 42.

=== LIN, Media General, and Nexstar ownership ===
On May 7, 2012, LIN Media announced that it would purchase the New Vision Television stations, including WIAT, for $330.4 million and the assumption of $12 million in New Vision corporate debt. LIN was acquired two years later by Media General, which opted to keep WIAT and divest WVTM, along with WJCL in Savannah, Georgia, to Hearst Television. After purchasing LIN, Media General initially agreed to merge with the Meredith Corporation but faced a shareholder revolt in the wake of an unsolicited offer from Nexstar Broadcasting Group, which agreed to acquire the company in 2016.

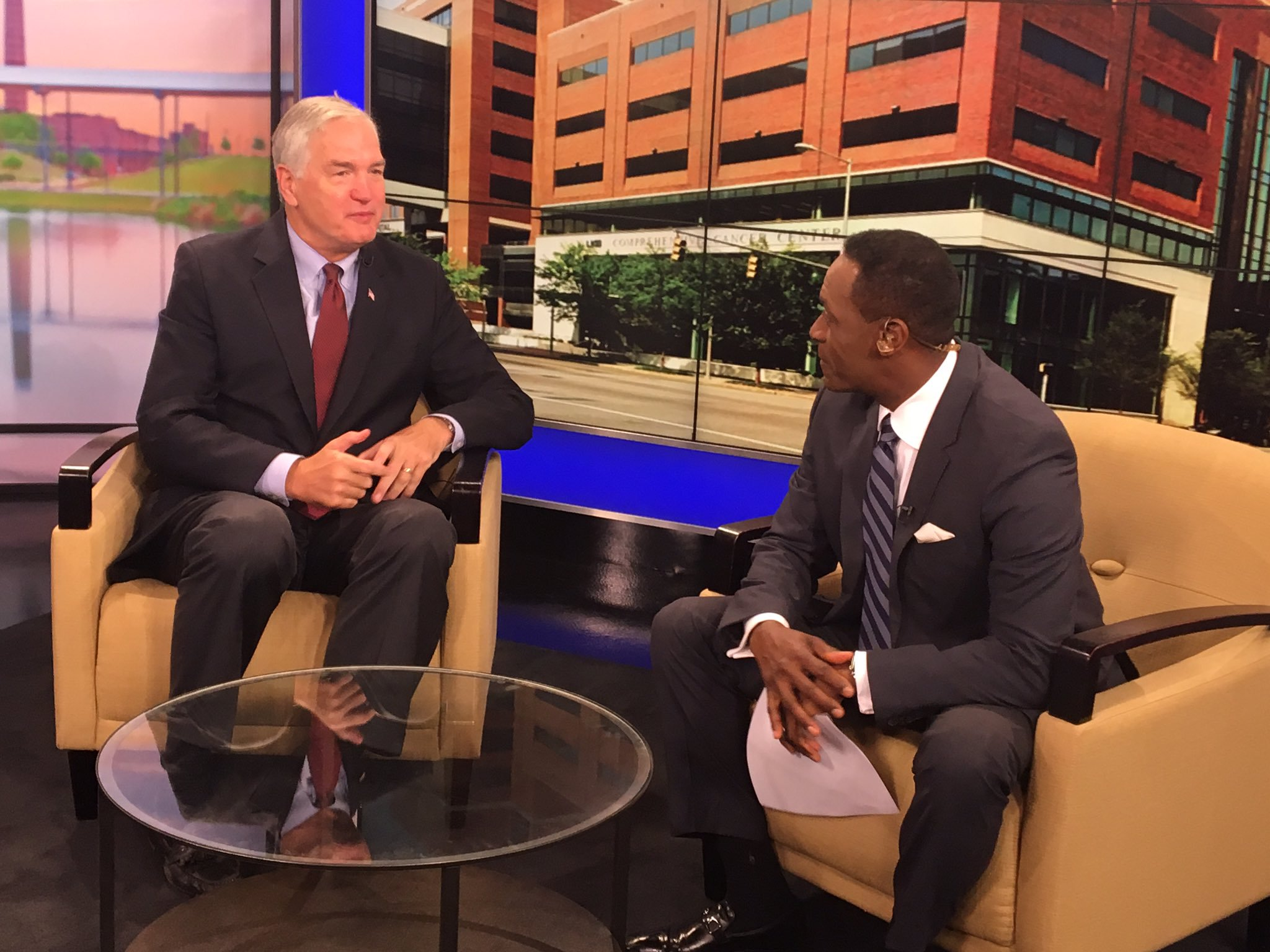
Luther Strange being interviewed in May 2017 by WIAT's Art Franklin

Several of the veteran personalities hired under Ballard departed in the late 2010s. Prater abruptly left WIAT in April 2018, later pleading guilty to harassing a woman he had dated. Dunaway moved to the news desk in 2015, co-anchoring the evening newscasts with Jackson, before leaving in 2018. He was replaced by Jack Royer, one of the youngest evening anchors in America at the time. Royer moved to mornings in 2020 as part of a switch with Art Franklin, who had been the first Black man to anchor an evening newscast in Birmingham at WBRC in the 1990s; Franklin departed in 2022.

=== Disaffiliation from CBS ===
WIAT lost its CBS affiliation to WVTM on August 1, 2026, as part of a modified renewal of most other Nexstar affiliations with CBS. Birmingham was one of four markets where stations owned by Hearst Television assumed the CBS affiliation from Nexstar-owned stations in their markets; a Nexstar spokesperson indicated WIAT would expand local news programming "with the new scheduling flexibility these transitions will afford". The CW affiliation, previously on WTTO, moved to WIAT on September 1. With the disaffiliation came a new news schedule, consisting of nine hours of local news programs each weekday.

== Notable former on-air staff ==
- Catherine Callaway – anchor, 1989–1993 (known as Catherine Gee at WBMG)
- Dale Cardwell – investigative reporter
- Alex Chappell – sports reporter
- Hank Erwin – anchor, early 1980s

== Subchannels ==
The WIAT transmitter is atop Red Mountain. The station's signal is multiplexed:

Subchannels of WIAT
Subchannel	Res.	Short name	Programming
42.1	1080i	WIAT-HD	The CW
42.2	480i	Mystery	Ion Mystery
42.3	480i	Grit	Grit
42.4	480i	IONPlus	Ion Plus
21.1	720p	WTTO	WTTO (Independent)

Broadcast on behalf of another station
