= WABM =

Television station in Birmingham, Alabama

- Birmingham–Tuscaloosa–; Anniston, Alabama; United States
- City: Birmingham, Alabama
- Channels: Digital: 20 (UHF); Virtual: 68
- Branding: My68; ABC 33/40 (68.2)

Programming
- Affiliations: 68.1: Independent with MyNetworkTV; 68.2: ABC; for others, see § Subchannels

Ownership
- Owner: Sinclair Broadcast Group; (Birmingham (WABM-TV) Licensee, Inc.)
- Sister stations: WBMA-LD, WTTO/WDBB

History
- Founded: October 13, 1983
- First air date: January 31, 1986
- Former call signs: WCAJ (1986–1991)
- Former channel numbers: Analog: 68 (UHF, 1986–2009); Digital: 36 (UHF, until 2020)
- Former affiliations: Independent (1986–1995, March–August 1998); UPN (1995–March 1998, August 1998–2006)
- Call sign meaning: "We've Got Alabama's Best Movies"; -or-; Alabama Birmingham; -or-; Alabama

Technical information
- Licensing authority: FCC
- Facility ID: 16820
- ERP: 1,000 kW
- HAAT: 401 m (1,316 ft)
- Transmitter coordinates: 33°29′4.8″N 86°48′25.2″W

Links
- Public license information: Public file; LMS
- Website: wabm68.com

WABM (channel 68) is a television station in Birmingham, Alabama, United States. It is programmed primarily as an independent station, but maintains a secondary affiliation with MyNetworkTV. WABM is owned by Sinclair Broadcast Group alongside fellow independent WTTO (channel 21) and low-power ABC affiliate WBMA-LD (channel 58, branded as ABC 33/40), and is co-managed with WDBB (channel 17), which serves as a full satellite station of WTTO.

WABM, WBMA-LD and WTTO share studios at the Riverchase office park on Concourse Parkway in Hoover (with a Birmingham mailing address); WABM's transmitter is located at the American General candelabra tower on Red Mountain (near Interstate 65) in southwestern Birmingham.

== History ==
=== As an independent station ===
The station first signed on the air on January 31, 1986, as WCAJ, originally operating as a religious independent station. Some of the initial programs that were featured on the station consisted of Catholic programs from the Irondale-based Eternal Word Television Network (EWTN), as well as programming from the Southern Baptist Convention-owned American Christian Television System (ACTS); it initially also carried secular comedy, drama and western programming on weekday afternoons and evenings. Its original studio facilities were located on the campus of Samford University.

After the Trinity Broadcasting Network signed on WTJP-TV (channel 60) in Gadsden that July, WCAJ's viewership declined significantly and the station was never able to recover for the remainder of its tenure as a religious outlet. By early 1987, WCAJ converted to a schedule consisting entirely of Christian programming. Eventually by that fall, the station added home shopping programming and infomercials to fill part of its schedule, while retaining some religious programs, which were relegated to mornings and late evenings; in 1990, the home shopping and infomercial programming was removed from the lineup, at which time the station reverted to an entirely religious schedule.

In 1990, the station was sold to Krypton Broadcasting, which changed its call letters to WABM and reformatted it into a general entertainment independent in January 1991; the reformatted lineup featured a mix of classic movies, dramas, and westerns. However, the station struggled at first against Fox affiliate WDBB (channel 17) and its Gadsden-based satellite WNAL-TV (channel 44, now WPXH-TV) and the market's leading independent station, WTTO (channel 21).

Although the Birmingham market essentially covered three separate markets (including Tuscaloosa and Anniston–Gadsden), it was not nearly large enough population-wise at the time for what were essentially three independent stations, and there simply was not enough first-run syndicated and acquired programming to fill all of their schedules. In 1991, WDBB and WNAL became semi-satellites of WTTO, which had assumed the Fox affiliation for the market earlier that year, simulcasting that station's programming 22 hours a day. As part of the deal, WDBB/WNAL moved their stronger programs onto WTTO's schedule. This resulted in WTTO owning a large amount of programming that it no longer had time to air, so it sold a large amount of its cartoons and classic sitcoms to WABM.

Even with a stronger format, WABM still trailed WTTO in the ratings. Channel 68 had a disadvantage when it came to signal coverage, especially after WDBB and WNAL became full-time satellites of WTTO in 1993. Between those three stations, WTTO, WDBB and WNAL provided a strong combined signal comparable to those of ABC affiliate WBRC-TV (channel 6) and NBC affiliate WVTM-TV (channel 13). In contrast, WABM provided only a city-grade signal within the Birmingham metropolitan area, while transmitting a grade B signal in the western and northern parts of the market. WABM also suffered because Krypton had run into financial problems during the early 1990s, which placed WABM at a severe disadvantage when it came to acquiring the strongest programming. The station filed for Chapter 11 bankruptcy in 1993.

After selling off its sister stations in West Palm Beach (WTVX) and Jacksonville, Florida (WNFT), Krypton sold WABM to a small locally based group in 1993. The new owners immediately entered into a local marketing agreement (LMA) with ABRY-owned WTTO. Under the LMA, WTTO and WABM began sharing certain programs—although both stations continued to maintain separate schedules—and WTTO provided advertising services for WABM on their behalf. In September of that year, the station began carrying programming from the Prime Time Entertainment Network syndication service. In 1994, Sinclair Broadcast Group assumed the rights to the LMA with WTTO/WDBB, when it acquired the latter upon its merger with ABRY.

=== UPN affiliation and brief disaffiliation ===
On January 16, 1995, WABM became the Birmingham charter affiliate of the United Paramount Network (UPN). However, it essentially continued to program as an independent station, since UPN only provided prime time programming on Monday and Tuesday evenings when the network launched (and would not carry five nights a week of programming until September 1998). It was one of three stations unaffected by the September 1996 affiliation switches that saw WBRC become a Fox owned-and-operated station, and its longtime ABC affiliation move to WBMA-LD (channel 58) and former CBS affiliates WCFT-TV (channel 33) in Tuscaloosa and WJSU-TV (channel 40) in Anniston.

In March 1998, WABM disaffiliated from UPN over concerns by Sinclair over ratings and monetary issues, as other stations owned by the company did in several additional markets following Sinclair's signing of a lucrative affiliation deal with The WB (which WTTO/WDBB affiliated with in an unrelated deal two years earlier). For five months, the station reverted to being an independent station, though the only effect on the station's schedule was the replacement of UPN programming with syndicated film packages during prime time and on Saturday afternoons, and infomercials taking the place of the network's UPN Kids block on Sunday mornings. In the interim, local cable providers began carrying the network's Secaucus, New Jersey–based flagship, WWOR-TV, to allow UPN programming to remain available in the Birmingham market; on the fringes of the market, the network was available only on cable systems through one of two out-of-market stations, WUPA in Atlanta and WGSA in Baxley–Savannah, Georgia, as most providers had dropped WWOR's "superstation" cable feed earlier in the decade due to the lack of interesting programming used to replace shows seen on the main WWOR signal after SyndEx rules went into effect, and the cable feed had been discontinued by satellite distribution rightsholder Advance Entertainment Corporation one year earlier and lent to Discovery Communications to increase national distribution for Animal Planet.

However, the loss of UPN created a side effect for WABM, as it experienced a decline in viewership without a network affiliation. Complaints were also lodged to the station from vocal Star Trek fans whose only option for watching Star Trek: Voyager were either by seeing it through UPN affiliates from other markets over-the-air or on cable, a subscription to Dish Network, DirecTV or PrimeStar to receive distant UPN stations via the satellite providers' respective "superstation" packages, or through tape trading. Sinclair would eventually reach a new affiliation pact with the network for the stations which lost their UPN affiliations but did not subsequently join The WB. After WABM re-affiliated with UPN on August 10, 1998, WWOR was dropped from the few area cable systems that carried it within days of WABM's reunion with the network. To make up for the preemptions of the program caused by the disaffiliation, WABM aired an all-day Voyager marathon that November, showing all thirteen episodes that WABM was not able to air during the second half of the 1997–98 season, with the permission of UPN and the program's production company, Paramount Television.

By the late 1990s, the station began to reduce the amount of classic sitcoms, movies and syndicated cartoons (such as Dennis the Menace and Sailor Moon) on its schedule, in favor of more recent sitcoms and the addition of talk, reality and court shows. Channel 68 continued to air animated series on weekday mornings until August 2003, when UPN discontinued its children's program block, Disney's One Too. On May 20, 2000, more than a decade after most television stations had converted to the audio format, WABM began transmitting its programming with stereophonic sound. In 2001, Sinclair purchased WABM outright, creating the Birmingham–Tuscaloosa–Anniston market's first television duopoly with WTTO/WDBB.

=== MyNetworkTV affiliation ===
On February 22, 2006, News Corporation announced the launch of MyNetworkTV, a new "sixth" broadcast network that would be operated by Fox Television Stations and its syndication division Twentieth Television. MyNetworkTV was created to compete against another upstart network that would launch at the same time that September, The CW (which assumed the scheduling model and most programming operations of The WB, but originally consisted primarily of a mix of UPN and The WB's higher-rated programs) as well as to give UPN- and WB-affiliated stations that were not named as charter CW affiliates another option besides converting into independent stations.

On March 1, 2006 (five days before Sinclair announced an agreement to affiliate 17 of its UPN, WB and independent stations with the network), Sinclair Broadcast Group and Fox Entertainment Group announced that WABM would become the market's charter affiliate of MyNetworkTV. WABM joined the network when MyNetworkTV launched on September 5, 2006; WTTO/WDBB became Central Alabama's CW charter affiliate when that network launched on September 18. For a time, WABM had considered acquiring the local broadcast rights to 4Kids TV, the Fox network's children's program block via a time-lease agreement with 4Kids Entertainment. Sister station WTTO had continued to carry its predecessor, Fox Kids, even after it lost the Fox affiliation to WBRC in September 1996; it dropped Fox Kids programming in the fall of 2000, however WBRC did not acquire the rights to the block, leaving it and future blocks programmed by 4Kids Entertainment unavailable in the Birmingham market. WABM eventually picked up Fox's Weekend Marketplace paid programming block in lieu of WBRC, when it replaced 4Kids TV in December 2008.

=== WBMA simulcast on WABM-DT2 and -DT3 ===
On July 29, 2013, Allbritton Communications announced that it would sell its seven television stations, including WBMA-LD and its satellite stations, WCFT-TV and WJSU-TV, to Sinclair, which purchased the stations for $985 million. As part of the deal, Sinclair had intended to sell the license assets of WABM and WTTO to Deerfield Media, and retain operational responsibilities for those stations through shared services and joint sales agreements. However, on December 6, 2013, the Federal Communications Commission (FCC) informed Sinclair that all related applications to the deal needed to be "amended or withdrawn", due to a longstanding time-brokerage agreement between WTTO and WDBB (which is nominally owned by Cunningham Broadcasting, a Sinclair partner company whose stock is majority owned by the family of the latter group's founder, Julian Sinclair Smith). The original structure of the deal would have effectively created a new LMA between WBMA and WDBB, even though the commission had ruled in 1999 that such agreements made after November 5, 1996, covering more than 15% of the broadcast day would count toward the ownership limits for the brokering station's owner.

On March 20, 2014, as part of a restructuring of the deal in order to address these ownership conflicts as well as to expedite the Allbritton acquisition because of them due to the FCC's increased scrutiny of outsourcing agreements used to circumvent in-market ownership caps, Sinclair announced that it would sell WABM to a third-party buyer and retain ownership of WTTO (as well as the outsourcing agreement with Cunningham for WDBB), forming a new duopoly with WBMA+ acting as the senior partner. Sinclair would not enter into a sharing arrangement with or maintain any contingent interest in WABM, other than a possible transitional shared facilities agreement until WTTO's operations were migrated from its existing studios on Beacon Parkway West to WBMA's facilities in Hoover. On May 29, 2014, Sinclair informed the FCC that it had not found a buyer for WABM (even among the market's three existing major station owners, WBRC owner Raycom Media, then-WVTM owner Media General and then-WIAT owner LIN Media, neither of which operated an existing duopoly station in the Birmingham market, although the latter two groups were in the process of merging at the time, with Media General eventually selling WVTM to Hearst Television); it proposed another restructured plan, in which it would surrender the WCFT-TV and WJSU-TV licenses, and have WABM simulcast WBMA-LD (which, as a low-power station, would not be affected as FCC rules allowed the ownership of low-power and full-power stations regardless of market ownership caps for duopolies) as a full-power satellite, with its existing syndicated and MyNetworkTV programming on its main channel being moved to a digital subchannel. Sinclair opted to retain WABM on the basis that its transmitter facilities were superior to those of WCFT and WJSU; indeed, moving ABC programming to WABM would give ABC a full-power affiliate in Birmingham itself for the first time since 1996.

On September 18, 2014 (a month and a half after Sinclair's acquisition of Allbritton Communications was finalized on August 1), WABM began simulcasting WBMA-LD's main channel on digital subchannel 68.2 in preparation for the planned shutdown of WCFT and WJSU eleven days later on September 29 (which would be aborted five days prior to the shutdown date on September 24, when Sinclair agreed to instead sell WCFT and WJSU to Howard Stirk Holdings for $50,000, foregoing any operational agreements with the company for the stations). WBMA-LD's main ABC programming and its "James Spann 24/7 Weather" channel were restored on WJSU's second and third subchannels on December 3, 2014.

== Sports programming ==
From 1992 to 2014, WABM held the local broadcast rights to college football and basketball games from the Atlantic Coast Conference (ACC) through Raycom Sports and its predecessor sports syndication services (with games televised as part of its ACC Network arm from 2009 to 2019), airing most regular season games from selected conference teams each year as well as games from the first three rounds of the ACC men's basketball tournament. When the SEC Network debuted, however, it wound up on WTTO instead. In August 2014, WABM became a charter outlet of the Sinclair-owned American Sports Network ad hoc syndication service, carrying mainly college sports events; as a result, the ACC Network broadcast rights for the Birmingham market were migrated to sister station WTTO/WDBB from 2015 to 2019.

WABM has locally broadcast Birmingham Legion FC soccer since the club began play in the USL Championship in 2019. WABM is also the local broadcast home for the Birmingham Squadron of the NBA G League.

== Technical information ==
=== Subchannels ===
The station's signal is multiplexed:

Subchannels of WABM
Subchannel	Res.	Short name	Programming
68.1	720p	MyTV	Independent / MyNetworkTV
68.2	720p	ABC3340	ABC (WBMA-LD)
68.3	480i	Weather	James Spann 24/7 Weather (WBMA-LD)
68.4	480i	TCN	True Crime Network
21.2	480i	Antenna	Antenna TV (WTTO)

Simulcast of subchannels of another station
Broadcast on behalf of another station

On October 4, 2010, WABM launched a digital subchannel on virtual channel 68.2 as an affiliate of TheCoolTV; the network was removed from the subchannel on August 31, 2012, after Sinclair dropped the music video network on 32 of its then-approximately 70 stations nationwide. The subchannel was reactivated on September 18, 2014, to act as a simulcast feed of WBMA-LD.

=== Analog-to-digital conversion ===
On February 2, 2009, Sinclair Broadcast Group announced to all cable and satellite television providers carrying its television stations via an e-mail release that regardless of the exact date of the mandatory switchover to digital-only broadcasting for full-power stations (which Congress rescheduled days later to June 12), its stations (including WABM) would shut down their analog signals on the originally scheduled transition date of February 17.

WABM ended regular programming on its analog signal, over UHF channel 68, at 11:59 p.m. on that date. The station's digital signal remained on its pre-transition UHF channel 36, using virtual channel 68. As part of the SAFER Act, WABM kept its analog signal on the air until March 19 to inform viewers of the digital television transition through a loop of public service announcements from the National Association of Broadcasters.

With the digital conversion, WABM moved its transmitter facilities from its analog transmitter site near Ishkooda Road (overlooking Elmwood Cemetery), across the western side of Red Mountain to the American General candelabra transmitter facility overlooking downtown Birmingham, where WTTO's transmitter is based.
