= ABC 33/40 =

Television station in Birmingham, Alabama

- Birmingham, Alabama; United States
- Channels: Virtual: 58.1, 17.2, 40.2, 68.2
- Branding: Alabama's ABC 33/40; ABC 33/40 News

Ownership
- Owner: Sinclair Broadcast Group; (WBMA Licensee, LLC)
- Sister stations: WABM, WDBB, WTTO

History
- First air date: September 1, 1996

Links
- Website: abc3340.com
- For technical information, see § Stations.

ABC 33/40 is a television station serving as the ABC affiliate for the Birmingham, Alabama, television market. It is broadcast by WBMA-LD (channel 58), a low-power station, in the immediate Birmingham area, as well as on subchannels of WABM (68.2) in Birmingham, WDBB (17.2) in Tuscaloosa, and WGWW (40.2) in Anniston. ABC 33/40 is owned by Sinclair Broadcast Group alongside WABM and WTTO (channel 21) and originates from studios in the Riverchase office park on Concourse Parkway in Hoover.

In 1994, a major realignment of television station affiliations was slated to affect Birmingham, with Birmingham's existing ABC affiliate, WBRC, designated to switch to Fox. As a result, ABC needed a new affiliate in the market. A number of stations were available, including in Birmingham itself. The network instead opted to partner with Allbritton Communications to buy WCFT-TV (channel 33) in Tuscaloosa and WJSU-TV (channel 40) in Anniston. Since 1970, these stations had served as CBS affiliates for western and eastern Alabama, respectively. On September 1, 1996, they became the ABC affiliate for the entire Birmingham market, branded ABC 33/40. At the same time, the station opened its Birmingham-area studio in Hoover. ABC 33/40 made national headlines in 1997 as the only ABC affiliate not to air the episode of Ellen in which Ellen DeGeneres came out as a lesbian.

Bolstered by the defections of popular on-air talent such as meteorologist James Spann and anchor Brenda Ladun from the top-rated WBRC news department, ABC 33/40 debuted at third place in local news ratings and rose to second place by the early 2000s, on occasion finishing in first place. In 2014, Sinclair acquired Allbritton. The companies together owned too many television station licenses in the Birmingham area, resulting in the sale of the WCFT and WJSU facilities to Howard Stirk Holdings. This triggered a change to the present transmission setup, though the 33/40 name remained. By 2023, the station had fallen to third place in news ratings.

== Background ==
Birmingham, Alabama, only had two commercial TV channels in the very high frequency (VHF) band, whose existence predated the Federal Communications Commission (FCC)'s freeze on new station grants. After the freeze was ended in 1952, these stations occupied channel 6 (WBRC) and 13 (WAFM-TV, today's WVTM-TV). Though efforts were made to move a third commercial VHF channel to Birmingham, the commission denied proposals in 1961 and 1963. As a result, Birmingham continued to only have two commercial stations until WBMG, operating on ultra high frequency (UHF) channel 42, began on October 17, 1965. WAPI-TV at the time was an affiliate of CBS and NBC, and WBMG lacked exclusive network affiliation, airing the shows of those two networks not seen on channel 13. This was the situation until May 31, 1970, when WAPI-TV became a sole NBC affiliate and WBMG a sole CBS affiliate.

WBMG, as a UHF station with a smaller coverage area, left a gap in Alabama broadcasting. It could not reach areas to the west or east of Birmingham that the VHF stations could, and outlets sprang up to provide this service. In Tuscaloosa, to the west, WCFT began broadcasting on channel 33 in 1965; in eastern Alabama, WHMA-TV (later WJSU-TV) started on channel 40 from Anniston in October 1969. At the same time that WBMG became a sole CBS affiliate, WCFT and WHMA-TV became full-time CBS affiliates. The effect was that WBRC and WVTM-TV, the VHF stations, served three television markets for ABC and NBC programming, while CBS had three affiliates, one each for Tuscaloosa, Birmingham, and Anniston–Gadsden. WBRC and WVTM-TV also expanded their newsgathering operations to Tuscaloosa and Anniston by opening news bureaus in the late 1980s.

Two additional commercial stations started in Birmingham after WBMG. WTTO (channel 21) was the market's first independent station when it began in April 1982 and became an affiliate of Fox on September 1, 1990. WCAJ began broadcasting on channel 68 in 1986 and changed call signs to WABM in 1991.

== Creation of ABC 33/40 ==
On May 23, 1994, Fox announced a deal with New World Communications to switch the affiliations of 12 stations New World owned or was buying from various Big Three networks to Fox. One of these was WBRC, which New World had agreed to purchase along with three other stations owned by Great American Communications earlier that month. The result was that ABC needed a new affiliate in the Birmingham television market and WTTO no longer had a network affiliation. Fox also maintained affiliates in western Alabama (WDBB, channel 17 in Tuscaloosa) and eastern Alabama (WNAL, channel 44 in Gadsden).

At the time of the switch, experts predicted one of two outcomes: WTTO would become an ABC affiliate, or ABC, concerned about moving to a UHF station, would sign WVTM-TV, leaving WTTO to affiliate with NBC. In Birmingham, the acquisition of WBRC had another consequence. New World had an option to buy WVTM-TV as part of its purchase of Argyle Television but could not own both stations at once and, in January 1995, prepared to exercise the WVTM option by placing WBRC and WGHP in High Point, North Carolina, into a blind trust. Three months later, Fox Television Stations acquired WBRC-TV and WGHP.

In the meantime, ABC examined its options for a new affiliate to serve Birmingham. With WVTM-TV and WBMG in long-term contracts with their existing networks, the network had multiple options, which included the three Fox affiliates and WABM. By this time, WABM was operated under a local marketing agreement (LMA) by Sinclair Broadcast Group, owner of WTTO. In November 1995, Sinclair bought WDBB, with some observers questioning whether Sinclair was angling for the ABC affiliation. The network opted for neither of those stations. On November 14, 1995, ABC announced it had agreed with Allbritton Communications to buy WCFT and lease WNAL from Fant Broadcasting. The combination would replace WBRC as Birmingham's ABC affiliate in 1996, once the affiliation contracts of WBRC and WCFT had run their course. After Allbritton's deal to lease WNAL from Fant fell through, it reached a new deal to run WJSU for ten years. WJSU had previously positioned itself for such a move by applying to relocate its tower closer to Birmingham, while WCFT was approved for a new 2,000-foot (610 m) transmission tower. From the start, Allbritton envisioned building a studio and news facility in the Birmingham area to serve the combined WCFT–WJSU operation, though the two stations already produced local news for their respective areas. Construction began on a facility in the Birmingham suburb of Hoover, for the new Alabama's ABC 33/40.

ABC 33/40 began broadcasting as the ABC affiliate for Birmingham, Tuscaloosa, and Anniston on September 1, 1996. However, some viewers, particularly in Shelby and St. Clair counties—including the studio at Hoover—and south and east of Birmingham, struggled to receive an adequate signal from either transmitter. In October 1997, WJSU-TV's transmitter was moved from Blue Mountain near Anniston to Bald Rock Mountain, near Leeds. This solved some issues but created others in eastern Alabama.

Within a year of launching, ABC 33/40 made national headlines. On April 30, 1997, it was the only ABC affiliate out of 223 stations that declined to screen "The Puppy Episode", an episode of the series Ellen in which Ellen DeGeneres came out as lesbian. General manager Jerry Heilman deemed the program unsuitable for family viewing, and ABC would not allow the program to be aired in a later time slot, so it opted not to air it at all. Birmingham Pride secured the use of Boutwell Memorial Auditorium to screen the episode. Some 2,500 people showed up, including national media outlets, as well as one of ABC 33/40's newscasters, Deborah Franklin, who called the decision "really embarrassing" for the station. By this time, the WBMA call sign was in use to promote the station; Allbritton acquired W58CK, a low-power station owned by Shirley H. James, which changed its call sign to WBMA-LP later that year.

In June 1998, ABC parent The Walt Disney Company entered into negotiations to purchase the eight Allbritton stations and the LMAs with WJSU-TV and WJXX serving Jacksonville, Florida, reportedly offering the company more than $1 billion to acquire them. Negotiations between Disney and Allbritton broke down when the former dropped out of discussions to buy the stations the following month.

The consolidation of WCFT and WJSU in the Birmingham media market led Nielsen Media Research to collapse the previously separate Tuscaloosa and Anniston Designated Market Areas in 1998, increasing the Birmingham market's population by 20 percent and moving it from the 51st- to the 39th-largest. By 2001, WBMA had established itself as a close second-place finisher to WBRC in local news ratings as WVTM slipped from second to third. Observers credited WBMA's entry into the market with making Birmingham TV news more competitive overall and increasing the quantity and quality of local sports coverage.

Between May 26, 2008, and March 23, 2009, Nielsen Media Research mistakenly undercounted viewership for WBMA+ (the line-item for viewership of all transmitters broadcasting ABC 33/40). Due to what the company later described as a "procedural error", it failed to account for viewership accruing from the stations' digital signals, which were used to feed cable and satellite providers in the market, only recording viewership from the analog signals. As a result, viewership figures for ABC 33/40 were reported as less than half of what station management expected. Nielsen continued to struggle with tabulating viewership for ABC 33/40 and other stations that were broadcast from multiple transmitters, resulting in reported unusual fluctuations in viewership, even within 15 minutes, and a week in January 2010 when it underreported ratings for WBMA's prime time lineup.

== Acquisition by Sinclair Broadcast Group ==
Allbritton announced the $985 million sale of its television stations to Sinclair Broadcast Group on July 29, 2013. In the initial version of the deal, Sinclair intended to sell the license assets of its existing Birmingham stations, WTTO and WABM, to Deerfield Media and retain operational responsibilities for those stations through shared services and joint sales agreements.

The Allbritton–Sinclair transaction came under scrutiny for a year. On December 6, the FCC informed Sinclair that the deal needed to be amended or withdrawn, citing concerns in three overlap markets: Charleston, South Carolina; Harrisburg, Pennsylvania; and Birmingham. Its primary concern in Birmingham was the relationship between WTTO and WDBB, which Sinclair brokered. The commission believed that, in assigning WTTO to Deerfield, Sinclair would be breaking up a grandfathered LMA, in effect prior to 1996, causing it to no longer be grandfathered. This would make WDBB attributable to Sinclair for ownership purposes and thus make the transaction violate FCC ownership limits. To address these and other ownership conflicts, on March 20, 2014, Sinclair and Allbritton revised the proposed transaction. It opted to retain WTTO, which would allow the WDBB LMA to continue; divest WABM to an independent buyer; and keep WBMA-LD, WCFT-TV, and WJSU-TV.

After two months, Sinclair was unable to identify an interested buyer for WABM. It instead proposed to keep WABM, move ABC 33/40 programming to one of its subchannels, and surrender the licenses of WCFT and WJSU to the FCC. It chose WABM because of what it deemed its superior technical facility. After nearly a year of delays, Sinclair's deal to acquire Allbritton was approved by the FCC on July 24, 2014, and was completed on August 1. Instead of surrendering the WCFT-TV and WJSU-TV facilities, as initially planned, they were sold to Howard Stirk Holdings in transactions in 2014 and 2015 under which only the transmitter facility and license were sold.

On September 18, 2014, ABC 33/40 was added to the multiplexes of WDBB and WABM (as 17.2 and 68.2). These high-power stations and WBMA-LD became the sole source of ABC 33/40 programming over the air, leaving over-the-air viewers in eastern Alabama dependent on the WJSU transmitter without the station's programming. By the end of 2014, subchannel 40.2 of WJSU (now WGWW) was re-added.

== News operation ==
In parallel with the construction of new studios, a new news team was assembled. Portions of the separate WCFT and WJSU news operations were retained as news bureaus and to provide cut-ins of area-specific news on local cable systems; for instance, ABC 33/40 had six people in news in Tuscaloosa compared to the 20-person WCFT news department. However, Allbritton sought to compete in the Birmingham area: it offered the highest wages of any station in the market and succeeded in attracting top talent. Multiple on-air talent came from WBRC, the Birmingham market news leader. The two highest-profile departures were Brenda Ladun, a popular anchor and reporter at WBRC, and meteorologist James Spann. Ladun had spent eight years with WBRC before departing in July 1996 and suing the station for discrimination and sexual harassment charges. Spann's departure was directly tied to the affiliation switch: he sued WBRC to get out of his employment contract, disclosing that he felt Fox programming went against his religious beliefs and that he would not permit his son to watch Fox.

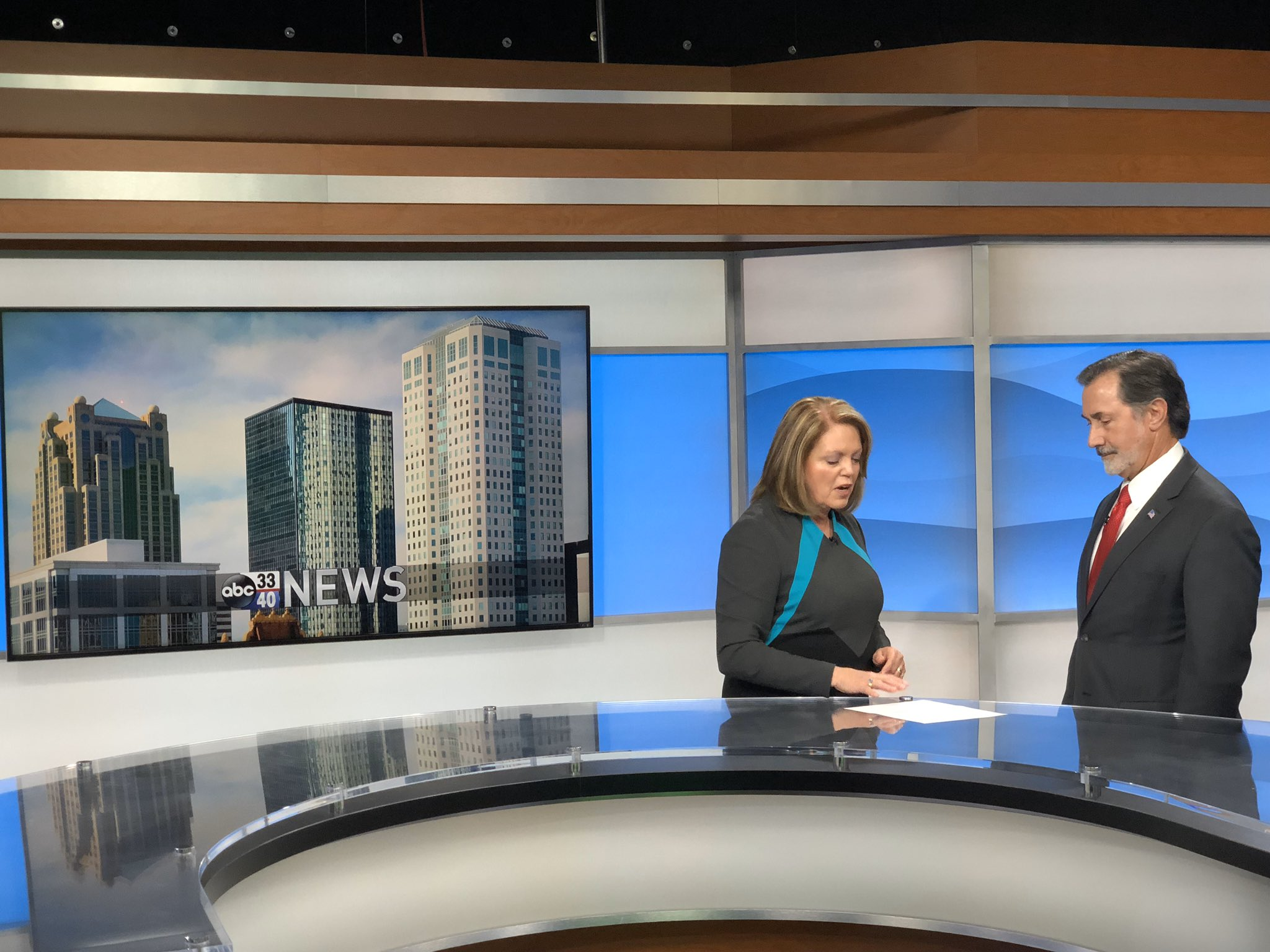
Pam Huff in the ABC 33/40 studio with Congressman Gary Palmer in 2020. Huff joined the WBMA staff in 1997.

ABC 33/40 began airing newscasts on its first day on air, September 1, 1996. It offered a 90-minute morning newscast and weekday news at noon, 5, 6, and 10 p.m., plus early and late evening news on weekends. Founding news director Garry Kelly insisted that the station have all its newscasts ready by launch. Two former WCFT anchors joined the new ABC 33/40 operation. With lawsuits between Fox and Allbritton still pending, Ladun and Spann made their ABC 33/40 debuts on October 7. In the first Birmingham ratings survey since its launch, ABC 33/40 placed third among the market's four news stations, taking viewers away from WBRC. In April 1997, ABC 33/40 hired Pam Huff, formerly of WVTM-TV, to anchor its Good Morning Alabama newscast.

WBMA became a second-place competitor with WBRC and, at times, WVTM in the Birmingham market over the course of the 2000s, though it lost the lead it had enjoyed for a time with its early evening newscasts. In November 2004's Nielsen ratings, WBMA placed first in the 5, 6, and 10 p.m. time slots for the first time in its history. The station debuted a 4 p.m. newscast in 2011. In November 2010, WBMA beat WBRC in prime time and 6 and 10 p.m. news; by 2023, it had slipped to third in late news, behind WVTM and well behind a dominant WBRC.

== Stations ==
ABC 33/40 currently broadcasts in the Birmingham, Anniston and Tuscaloosa media market, and originates over WBMA-LD, a low-power station licensed to Birmingham with transmitter located atop Red Mountain. ABC 33/40 is also rebroadcast over the following stations, all of which air ABC 33/40 on their second subchannel and James Spann 24/7 Weather on their third subchannel. For further information on WABM, WDBB and WGWW, see their respective articles.

ABC 33/40 primary station and satellites
Station	City of license	Channel	FID	ERP	HAAT	Transmitter coordinates	First air date	Public license information
WBMA-LD	Birmingham	32	60214	15 kW	244.1 m (801 ft)	33°26′28″N 86°53′2″W	c. May 1997	LMS
WABM-DT2	Birmingham	20	16820	1,000 kW	401 m (1,316 ft)	33°29′4.8″N 86°48′25.2″W	January 31, 1986	Public file; LMS
WDBB-DT2	Bessemer	14	71325	675 kW	637 m (2,090 ft)	33°28′48″N 87°25′50″W	October 8, 1984	Public file; LMS
WGWW-DT2	Anniston	9	56642	15.6 kW	359 m (1,178 ft)	33°36′24″N 86°25′3″W	October 26, 1969	Public file; LMS

=== Subchannels ===
WBMA-LD's signal carries the following multiplexed lineup:

Subchannels of WBMA-LD
Subchannel	Res.	Short name	Programming
58.1	720p	WBMA-1	ABC
58.2	480i	WBMA-2	James Spann 24/7 Weather (4:3)
58.3	480i	WBMA-3	The Nest (4:3)
58.4	480i	Charge!	Charge! (4:3)

Grade A signal contours for WBMA-LD (channel 58), and all associated translators and satellites.; WBMA-LD 58.1 Birmingham, AL WABM-DT2 68.2 Birmingham, AL; WDBB-DT2 17.2 Bessemer, AL; WGWW-DT2 40.2 Anniston, AL
