= WPXH-TV =

Television station in Hoover, Alabama

- Hoover–Birmingham, Alabama; United States
- City: Hoover, Alabama (Note: Originally licensed to Gadsden, Alabama; moved to Hoover in 2019.)
- Channels: Digital: 33 (UHF); Virtual: 44

Programming
- Affiliations: 44.1: Ion Television; for others, see § Subchannels

Ownership
- Owner: Inyo Broadcast Holdings; (Inyo Broadcast Licenses LLC)

History
- Founded: July 16, 1984
- First air date: April 1986 (Note: The Broadcasting and Cable Yearbook says April 26, while the Television and Cable Factbook says April 25.)
- Former call signs: WNAL-TV (1986–1998)
- Former channel numbers: Analog: 44 (UHF, 1986–2009); Digital: 45 (UHF, until 2019)
- Former affiliations: Independent (April–October 1986, 1990–1991, May–August 1999); Fox (via WDBB, 1986–1990; via WTTO, 1991–1996); CBS (1996–May 1999); The WB (secondary, January−September 1996)
- Call sign meaning: PX for "Pax", H to disambiguate from other stations

Technical information
- Licensing authority: FCC
- Facility ID: 73312
- ERP: 300 kW
- HAAT: 318.4 m (1,045 ft)
- Transmitter coordinates: 33°29′2″N 86°48′21″W

Links
- Public license information: Public file; LMS
- Website: iontelevision.com

WPXH-TV (channel 44) is a television station licensed to Hoover, Alabama, United States, serving the Birmingham area as an affiliate of Ion Television. The station is owned by Inyo Broadcast Holdings, and broadcasts from a transmitter atop Red Mountain, near the city's southern edge.

== History ==
=== As a satellite of WTTO and WDBB ===
The station traces its creation to issues involving independent station WDBB (channel 17) in Tuscaloosa, which was looking to increase its profile in central Alabama. When that station signed on in October 1984, at a time when cable television still did not have much penetration in the region, WDBB faced problems in trying to improve its coverage throughout the central part of the state, as its signal was nowhere near strong enough to cover the northern half of the market, particularly areas to the northeast of Birmingham proper. Although WDBB's founding owner, Dubose Broadcasting, invested heavily in the station and acquired a strong inventory of syndicated programming, the signal's inability to reach most of central Alabama put WDBB at a severe disadvantage against the area's other major independent, WTTO (channel 21) in Birmingham, which had early on established itself as one of the strongest independent stations in the Deep South and the United States as a whole.

Dubose found a solution when the Federal Communications Commission (FCC) awarded the company a construction permit to launch a television station in Gadsden on UHF channel 44. That station signed on in April 1986 as WNAL-TV, originally operating as a full-time satellite station for the northern half of the market—specifically, areas to the east of downtown Birmingham—that could not receive the WDBB signal. Shortly before WNAL signed on, Dubose reached an agreement with the Fox Broadcasting Company to become the network's charter affiliate for central Alabama after WTTO turned down an offer to join the network. WDBB further strengthened its hand by using its forthcoming status as a network affiliate to make a concerted effort to improve its reach in Birmingham by applying to transfer its city of license to Bessemer, 15.5 miles (24.9 km) southwest of Birmingham, which allowed it to build a new transmitter tower located closer to Birmingham that would provide a much stronger signal in the western portion of the city.

WDBB and WNAL became Fox charter affiliates when the network officially launched on October 9, 1986. As was the case with other Fox stations during the network's early years, channels 17 and 44 continued to program as de facto independent stations as the late-night talk show The Late Show Starring Joan Rivers was the network's only program initially; when Fox debuted its prime time schedule in April 1987, the network only carried evening programming on weekends, and would not carry seven nights a week of programming until June 1993. Until Fox began airing programming on a nightly basis, WDBB and WNAL aired movies (and later, syndicated programs) at 7 p.m. on nights when the network was not scheduled to air any programming.

Despite covering roughly half of central Alabama over-the-air and the two stations maintaining a relatively strong program lineup, the signal of WDBB did not provide better than Grade B coverage (at best) within Birmingham proper. Due to the eastward location of its transmitter tower, WNAL's signal did not penetrate well into Birmingham either, only reaching as far west as extreme eastern Jefferson County. In addition, several major cable providers in the Birmingham market, including in Jefferson and Shelby counties, refused to carry the station for this reason. Ultimately, WDBB/WNAL was not profitable. After all efforts to increase the stations' cable coverage failed, Fox signed an agreement to make WTTO its new Birmingham affiliate and moved its programming to channel 21 in January 1991.

Soon afterward, Dubose reached an agreement with ABRY Communications in which WDBB and WNAL would convert into semi-satellites of WTTO and begin simulcasting its programming for the vast majority of their broadcast day, with separate syndicated programming airing during the three hours that the stations continued to program themselves. As part of the deal, WDBB/WNAL merged its stronger inventory of programming onto WTTO's schedule, with the local rights to some classic sitcoms on its schedule that it could not retain or move elsewhere on the schedule being sold to WABM (channel 68) in Birmingham, which converted into a general entertainment independent around the same time the WTTO/WDBB/WNAL simulcasting arrangement went into place. The station subsequently began identifying as "Fox 21", using the channel allocation of WTTO as a universal brand for it and its repeaters. The combination of WTTO, WDBB and WNAL provided a strong combined signal throughout the central third of Alabama that was comparable to those of ABC affiliate WBRC-TV (channel 6) and NBC affiliate WVTM-TV (channel 13). In 1993, ABRY had purchased WDBB and WNAL outright and converted both stations into full-time satellite stations of WTTO, resulting in the removal of local programming on the former two stations.

By 1994, the WTTO/WDBB/WNAL combination had become one of the highest-rated Fox affiliates in the country, and managed to overtake then-underperforming CBS affiliate WBMG (channel 42, now WIAT) as the third-highest-rated television station in central Alabama. Late that year, both WDBB and WNAL began airing separate programming during the daytime and late evening hours, consisting of syndicated sitcoms, drama and animated series that WTTO did not hold the rights to broadcast as well as local newscasts. That same year, the Hunt Valley, Maryland–based Sinclair Broadcast Group acquired WTTO, WDBB and WNAL when it merged with ABRY Communications, which also assumed a local marketing agreement (LMA) with WABM (a deal signed the previous year when WABM was sold to a locally based group). In 1995, WNAL was purchased by Fant Broadcasting, but continued to simulcast WTTO's programming through a time brokerage agreement.

=== As a CBS affiliate ===
In March 1994, Great American Communications agreed to sell WBRC to New World Communications, as part of a deal that also involved three of the former group's other television stations (WDAF-TV in Kansas City, KSAZ-TV in Phoenix and WGHP in High Point, North Carolina). Subsequently, three weeks later, New World agreed to purchase WVTM and three other stations (KTVI in St. Louis, KDFW in Dallas, and KTBC in Austin, Texas) from Argyle Television Holdings. New World was now faced with the prospect of having to divest as many as three of the acquired stations as the FCC forbade broadcasting companies from owning two commercial television stations in the same market, and restricted them from owning more than twelve stations nationwide (the concurrent acquisitions of the Argyle and Citicasters stations put New World three stations over the national television ownership cap).

On May 23, 1994, six months after the network signed a deal with the National Football League (NFL) to acquire the rights to the National Football Conference television package, New World signed an affiliation agreement with Fox to switch twelve of its television stations—six that New World had already owned and eight that the company was in the process of acquiring through the Argyle and Citicasters deals, including WBRC—to the network, once their existing affiliation contracts with CBS, NBC or ABC expired. Although WTTO was one of Fox's strongest affiliates at the time, the network saw the opportunity to affiliate with WBRC because it had been the highest-rated station in the Birmingham market for most of its history.

Seeing a chance to solve its ownership conflicts in Birmingham, New World reached an agreement with Citicasters to sell WBRC (as well as WGHP) directly to the network's owned-and-operated station group, Fox Television Stations, in return for $130 million in promissory notes; New World would also establish an outside trust company that would operate channel 6 until the sale was completed.

Even though the sale would be finalized on July 24, 1995, Fox Television Stations could not convert WBRC into a Fox owned-and-operated station in the short term as the station's affiliation agreement with ABC was not set to expire until August 31, 1996. While this put WBRC in the rare position of being owned by the O&O group of one network while still affiliated with another, it also gave ABC enough time to find a replacement affiliate in Birmingham; this was also instrumental in causing a complicated series of affiliation changes involving six central Alabama stations. In November 1995, as part of its $20 million purchase of CBS affiliate WCFT-TV (channel 33, now WSES) in Tuscaloosa from Federal Broadcasting, Allbritton Communications signed a deal with Fant Broadcasting to assume operational responsibilities and provide programming to WNAL-TV under a local marketing agreement. Allbritton backed out of the LMA proposal with Fant in January 1996, and instead signed a deal with Osborne Communications Corporation to acquire the non-license assets of CBS affiliate WJSU-TV (channel 40, now WGWW) in Anniston under an LMA. The Allbritton deals served as the catalyst for an affiliation agreement between ABC and Allbritton in April 1996 that renewed or established new affiliation deals with the group's seven television stations.

ABC and Allbritton reached a precursor agreement to that affiliation deal two months prior, after it declined an offer by the Sinclair Broadcast Group. Sinclair's notification to the network that the station had no intention of starting a news department and wanted to only carry its prime time and news programming led ABC to turn down an offer to affiliate with WTTO (which, along with WNAL and WDBB, was set to lose its Fox affiliation to WBRC). Under that deal, Allbritton agreed to make WCFT and WJSU the new Central Alabama affiliates of ABC, with WJSU initially intending to act as the satellite station to WCFT (Allbritton would subsequently purchase low-power independent station W58CK (channel 58, now WBMA-LD) in Birmingham to allow the two others to be counted in Nielsen ratings reports for that market). In January 1996, WNAL-TV became a secondary affiliate of The WB; it carried WB programming on tape delay on Sunday and Wednesday nights after Fox network programming. Fant Broadcasting subsequently approached CBS about switching to the network, and in February 1996, reached a deal to make WNAL-TV the network's new affiliate for northeastern Alabama.

On September 1, 1996, when WBRC officially became a Fox owned-and-operated station and W58CK, WCFT and WJSU became ABC affiliates, WNAL officially discontinued its part-time simulcast of WTTO (which, along with WDBB, became independent stations); WCFT and WJSU ceded the CBS programming rights in central Alabama to WNAL, which became the CBS affiliate for the Anniston–Gadsden market, and WBMG, which had recently upgraded its transmitter to provide a much stronger full-power signal throughout much of the central third of the state. Channel 44's switch left Central Alabama without a WB affiliate until WTTO/WDBB switched to the network in January 1997.

=== Sale to Paxson Communications ===
In September 1996, shortly after it became a CBS affiliate, Fant Broadcasting sold WNAL-TV to Paxson Communications (now Ion Media), which initially intended to shift it to its infomercial-focused Infomall TV Network (inTV). However, Paxson continued to operate the station as a CBS affiliate after the sale was completed, as its affiliation contract with CBS did not expire until April 1999.

On January 13, 1998, the station changed its call letters to WPXH in preparation of becoming the Birmingham market's charter owned-and-operated station of Pax TV (now Ion Television), though it would continue to honor the CBS affiliation contract in full even after the network's debut on August 31, 1998. That year, the station moved its transmitter facilities to a tower near Inland Lake, south of Oneonta in Blount County.

In September 1998, Nielsen merged the Tuscaloosa and Anniston–Gadsden markets back into the Birmingham market as a result of the consolidation of WCFT, WJSU, and WBMA-LP into Birmingham's ABC affiliate two years earlier, which expanded the designated market area to encompass nearly the entire width of the state, stretching from the Alabama–Georgia state line westward to the Mississippi–Alabama border. The move benefited all of the major Birmingham stations as it increased their available viewership in the three cities and resulted in the newly expanded market's placement in Nielsen's national market rankings jumping by twelve spots from 51st to 39th place.

WPXH officially disaffiliated from CBS on April 30, 1999, with Paxson deciding to hold out on converting the station to its network for a few months. The CBS affiliation rights for Central Alabama were then ceded exclusively to WIAT, which became the network's sole affiliate for the enlarged Birmingham market. The station finally began to carry Pax TV on August 1, 1999.

WPXH-TV signed on its digital signal on UHF channel 45 in November 2002. The station ended regular programming on its analog signal, over UHF channel 44, on June 12, 2009, the official date on which full-power television stations in the United States transitioned from analog to digital broadcasts under federal mandate. The station's digital signal remained on its pre-transition UHF channel 45, using virtual channel 44.

As it opted to become a participant of the Short-term Analog Flash and Emergency Readiness Act amendment in the DTV Delay Act, for two weeks after the transition date until June 26, 2009, WPXH-TV continued to provide programming on its analog signal to air a loop of public service announcements informing viewers on the digital transition.

In the late 2010s, what was now Ion Media applied to change WPXH's physical channel from 45 to 33 as part of the FCC's spectrum reallocation, along with moving its transmitter from Oneonta and into Birmingham proper, broadcasting from the Red Mountain site just south of town where the market's other television stations originate. With the change, it would no longer have any signal serving Gadsden. WPXH-TV's city of license was thus moved to the Birmingham suburb of Hoover. The new transmitter was activated early in 2020, centralizing channel 44 as a Birmingham area station.

== Newscasts ==
Unlike other former independent stations and Fox affiliates that joined a Big Three network displaced due to Fox's affiliation deals with longtime major network stations, WPXH-TV (as WNAL-TV) did not invest in its own news department after it was affiliated with CBS in September 1996. Instead of local news programming, WNAL opted to air religious programming on weekday mornings before CBS This Morning (as well as the CBS Morning News) and at 10 p.m., and syndicated comedy and drama series at 5 and 6 p.m. In February 1998, the station entered into a news share agreement with Birmingham CBS affiliate WIAT (which temporarily shut down its news department the month prior, as part of a reboot of its news department in an effort to increase the persistently low ratings of its news programming), in which it would simulcast that station's nightly 5 and 10 p.m. newscasts; the WIAT news simulcasts were dropped in May 1999, when channel 44 became an independent station.

In September 2001, as a Pax TV owned-and-operated station, WPXH entered into a news share agreement with WVTM-TV as part of an overall corporate management agreement between Paxson Communications and NBC. Under the agreement, WPXH-TV began airing rebroadcasts of WVTM's 6 and 10 p.m. newscasts on a half-hour tape delay (at 6:30 and 10:30 p.m.) each Monday through Friday night. The newscasts were discontinued after the 10 p.m. news rebroadcast on June 30, 2005, as Paxson had decided to end the news share agreements for its owned-and-operated stations upon Pax's rebranding as i: Independent Television.

== Subchannels ==
The station's signal is multiplexed:

Subchannels of WPXH-TV
Subchannel	Res.	Short name	Programming
44.1	720p	WPXH-TV	Ion Television
44.2	720p	CourtTV	Court TV
44.3	480i	Laff	Laff
44.4	480i	MeToons	MeTV Toons
44.5	480i	Mystery	Ion Mystery
44.6	480i	GameSho	Game Show Central
44.7	480i	HSN	HSN
44.8	480i	QVC	QVC
44.9	480i	QVC2	QVC2
