= WVTM-TV =

Television station in Birmingham, Alabama

- Birmingham–Tuscaloosa–; Anniston, Alabama; United States
- City: Birmingham, Alabama
- Channels: Digital: 7 (VHF); Virtual: 13
- Branding: WVTM 13; Alabama's CBS (13.4)

Programming
- Affiliations: 13.1: NBC; 13.4: CBS; for others, see § Subchannels

Ownership
- Owner: Hearst Television; (WVTM Hearst Television Inc.)

History
- First air date: June 12, 1949
- Former call signs: WAFM-TV (1949–1953); WABT (1953–1958); WAPI-TV (1958–1980)
- Former channel numbers: Analog: 13 (VHF, 1949–2009); Digital: 52 (UHF, until 2009), 13 (VHF, 2009–2020)
- Former affiliations: CBS (primary 1949–1954, joint primary 1961–1970); ABC (secondary, 1949–1961); DuMont (secondary, 1952–1955); NBC (joint primary, 1961–1965)
- Call sign meaning: Vulcan–Times Mirror, referencing the Vulcan statue and station ownership from 1980 to 1993

Technical information
- Licensing authority: FCC
- Facility ID: 74173
- ERP: 47.6 kW
- HAAT: 400.3 m (1,313 ft)
- Transmitter coordinates: 33°29′26″N 86°47′48″W

Links
- Public license information: Public file; LMS
- Website: www.wvtm13.com

WVTM-TV (channel 13) is a television station in Birmingham, Alabama, United States, affiliated with NBC and CBS. Owned by Hearst Television, the station maintains studios and transmitter facilities atop Red Mountain, between Vulcan Trail and Valley View Drive in southeastern Birmingham, adjacent to the Vulcan statue and next to the studios of Fox affiliate WBRC (channel 6).

WVTM-TV was the first television station to broadcast in Alabama. It began airing test programming in June 1949 as WAFM-TV and initiated regular service on July 1, the same day as WBRC. It was co-owned with WAPI and WAFM radio and changed call signs to WABT in 1953, after being acquired by The Birmingham News, and WAPI-TV in 1958. For its first 21 years on air, the station held two network affiliations: CBS and ABC (1949–1954), NBC and ABC (1954–1961), and NBC and CBS (1961–1970). Though Birmingham gained a third station in 1965, WBMG (channel 42, now WIAT) initially relied on network programs that channel 13 chose not to air before WAPI-TV opted to become a sole NBC affiliate beginning in May 1970.

The Times Mirror Company acquired the station in March 1980 and, as it had separated from WAPI radio, changed its call sign to WVTM-TV (Vulcan–Times Mirror). Under Times Mirror, WVTM became competitive in news with WBRC for the first time following the 1981 hiring of former WBRC anchors Joe Langston and Herb Winches. Though they left after less than two years, WVTM remained neck-and-neck with WBRC until 1989, when that station began to widen the news ratings gap. In 1993, Times Mirror sold its last stations, WVTM among them, to Argyle Television Holdings. Argyle was bought by New World Communications, which was simultaneously involved in switching other stations including WBRC to Fox. However, a 10-year affiliation deal with NBC protected WVTM from changing affiliations. In 1996, NBC acquired WVTM, making it an owned-and-operated station. Under NBC, news ratings sank in the five years following Birmingham's affiliation switch as ABC 33/40 became a major competitor in the market.

NBC spun off WVTM and three other stations in mid-sized markets to Media General in 2006. When Media General merged with LIN Media in 2014, it elected to retain that company's WIAT and divested WVTM to Hearst. Since the transaction, WVTM has improved its ratings standing back to second place. On August 1, 2026, WVTM's fourth subchannel became the market's CBS affiliate, replacing WIAT.

== History ==
=== WAFM-TV: Construction and early years ===
On February 10, 1948, Voice of Alabama, Inc.—the owner of Birmingham radio stations WAPI (1070 AM) and WAFM—applied to the Federal Communications Commission (FCC) for permission to build a television station on channel 13 in the city, which was granted on April 29 of that year. Voice of Alabama had first envisioned a television station for Birmingham at the end of the 1930s and began negotiating with the CBS network by 1944.

By June 1, 1949, WAFM-TV was on the air with test patterns. This made it the first station to send a signal in Alabama, beating Birmingham's other TV station, WBRC-TV (channel 6). A test schedule with programming aired on June 12; regular programming followed on July 1. The station had affiliations with CBS and ABC, while WBRC-TV presented NBC programs. In its first night of regular programs, WAFM-TV carried Starlight Opera, an outdoor concert presentation. The station also offered Birmingham Black Barons baseball telecasts, live football and basketball, and special event broadcasts.

Live network television arrived in Birmingham in September 1950, when coaxial cable reached the city. Previously, all network programs in Birmingham had been seen via lower-quality kinescopes—filmed recordings of a television monitor. WBRC-TV and WAFM-TV shared a cable until 1951, when the addition of a second cable allowed more network programs to be telecast live. Voice of Alabama, Inc., became The Television Corporation in November 1952; by the next month, WAFM-TV was also airing programming from the DuMont Television Network.

Birmingham would only have two television stations for more than 15 years. A third station, planned by WSGN, had been filed for and was pending when the FCC in 1948 froze all television station grants. WAFM and WSGN shared a tower for FM and TV telecasting, and it was planned for a future WSGN-TV to use the same antenna as WAFM-TV. WSGN-TV was planned to telecast on channel 9 and hoped to get channel 10, which was allocated to Birmingham. But when the freeze ended, channel 10 was reserved non-commercial educational, leaving only channels in the new ultra high frequency (UHF) band. WSGN-TV was approved for channel 42 in December 1952. It would have affiliated with ABC, given WSGN radio's association with the network. WSGN and its FM counterpart, WSGN-FM, were owned by The Birmingham News newspaper.

=== Purchase by The Birmingham News ===
On April 8, 1953, the Birmingham News Co. announced its purchase of The Television Corporation and the WAPI–WAFM stations from Thad Holt and Edward L. Norton, thereby abandoning its UHF station plans for WSGN as well as WSGN radio itself. At the time, Norton was exiting broadcasting, having sold his other stations—WMBR-AM-FM-TV in Jacksonville, Florida—to The Washington Post. The gross sale price, including property and land, was greater than $2.4 million. The FCC approved the transaction in June 1953, after arrangements were made to sell the WSGN stations.

Under Norton and Holt, WAFM-TV was approved to increase its effective radiated power to 316,000 watts. On September 29, 1953, channel 13 began broadcasting with the new power level. The call sign was changed at that time to WABT ("Alabama's Best Television"), which was believed to be similar and more in line with WAPI and WAFM. On July 4, 1954, WABT traded primary network affiliations with WBRC-TV and joined NBC; however it retained a secondary affiliation with ABC as did WBRC-TV, which took over the CBS affiliation as its then-new owners, Storer Broadcasting, had a strong relationship with the network. The first network color program broadcast in Birmingham was aired less than two weeks later. Later in 1954, ground was broken on an expansion to the Red Mountain facility to include a second studio with a revolving stage for the display of large products such as cars. DuMont ceased its existence as a network in 1955.

In its early years, channel 13 aired a variety of local programs. Benny Carle hosted Western Theater, which was among the most popular TV shows in Birmingham until WBRC-TV hired him away in 1954. Magician Cliff Holman hosted a children's program on the station for 15 years from 1954 until 1969, when he departed to help set up WHMA-TV in Anniston. Other programs produced by the station included the women's interest magazine Carousel; Red Mountain Wranglers; Breakfast in Birmingham; and Model Kitchen.

=== WAPI-TV: Newhouse ownership ===
In December 1955, Samuel Irving Newhouse Sr. acquired The Birmingham News, its Birmingham broadcast stations, The Huntsville Times, and its associated broadcast stations in Huntsville, Alabama, for $18.7 million, the largest transaction in newspaper history to that point. The transaction received FCC approval in January 1956. On September 28, 1958, WAFM became WAPI-FM and WABT became WAPI-TV, uniting the co-owned stations under one base call sign.

WBRC-TV owner Taft Broadcasting signed a group affiliation agreement with ABC in March 1961, with all of them leaving CBS. Beginning September 2, WAPI-TV became a secondary CBS affiliate, and the network's top programs moved to channel 13. The station aired both networks' evening newscasts—Douglas Edwards with the News and the Huntley–Brinkley Report. Only in October 1965 did the full schedules of CBS and NBC begin to air in central Alabama. This was due to the advent of a new UHF station, WBMG (channel 42). WBMG had no primary network affiliation and instead depended on the programs WAPI-TV did not select from NBC and CBS. Under this arrangement, because WAPI-TV had first-call rights to both networks, series moved between the stations, sometimes in the middle of the television season. WAPI-TV did not air the two nights a week of movies from each of NBC and CBS, giving WBMG four nights a week of films. In 1967, WAPI-TV began producing local programs in color, including its local newscasts and Romper Room.

The dual-affiliation arrangement ended on May 31, 1970, when WAPI-TV became the sole NBC affiliate under a new agreement with NBC and WBMG the sole CBS affiliate. WAPI-TV general manager Donald D. Wear felt that focusing on a single network and complementing it with local programming would better serve the market.

In 1973, the Magic City Communications Coalition, a group of Black interests, challenged the renewal of WAPI-TV's broadcast license. It charged that the Newhouse ownership of the WAPI broadcast stations and The News was anticompetitive and accused the station of underemploying Black people in its operations and of racial discrimination. The commission dismissed the petition and granted the renewal in 1976.

=== WVTM-TV: Times-Mirror ownership and the Argyle–New World carousel ===
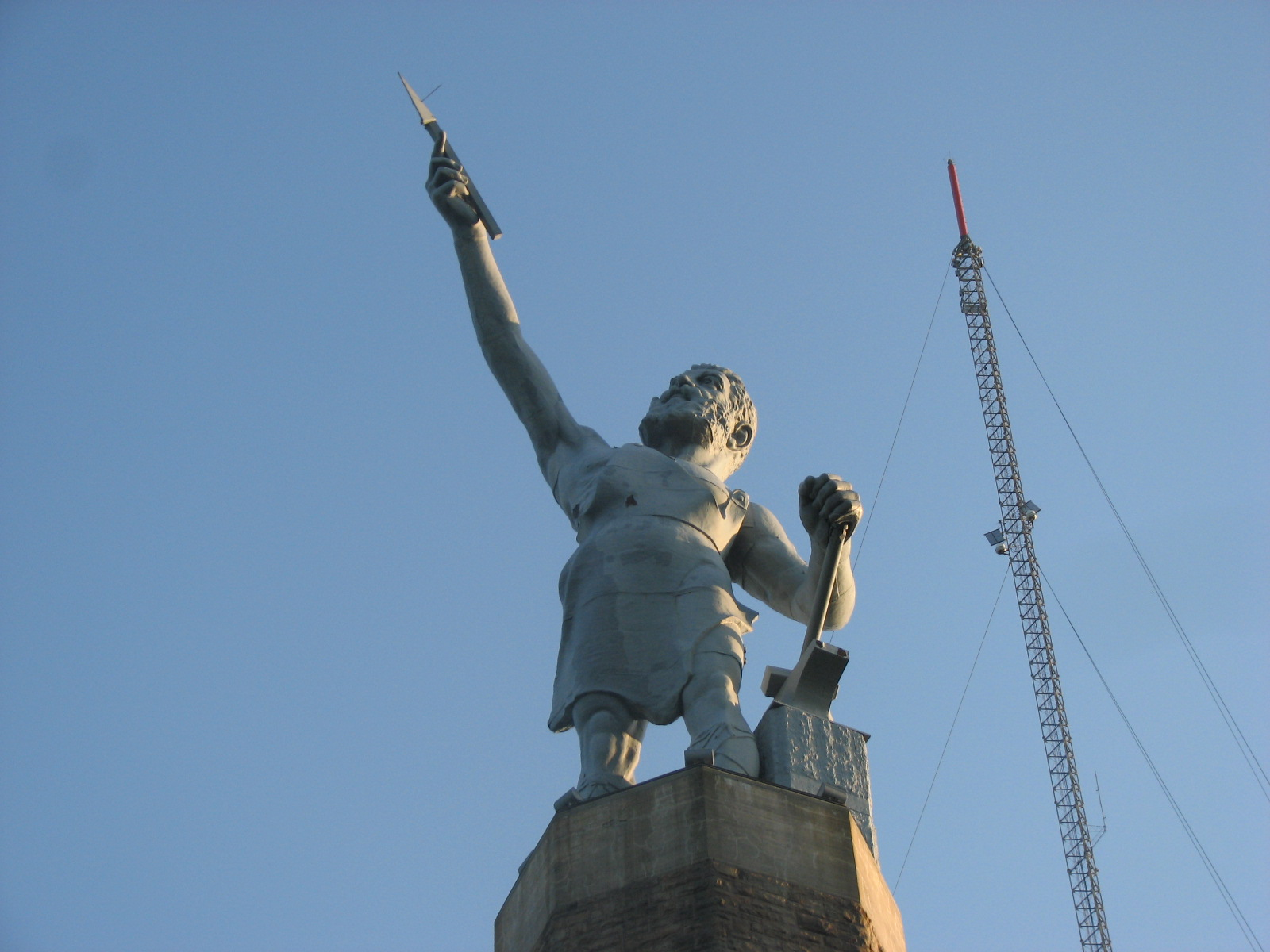
The Vulcan statue, next to WVTM-TV's studio and tower (pictured) on Red Mountain, is represented as the V in the station's call sign.

Citing pressure to divest itself of cross-ownership combinations of newspapers and television stations, Newhouse announced in December 1978 that it would sell all five of its TV stations to the Times Mirror Company of Los Angeles for $82.38 million. Four of the five markets in which Newhouse sold stations, including Birmingham, were cities where the company owned newspapers. The FCC approved the transaction in March 1980, and new call signs followed for most of the stations. WAPI-TV became WVTM-TV, for Vulcan and Times Mirror.

In March 1993, Times Mirror sold its four TV stations to Argyle Television Holdings in a two-part deal. WVTM and KTVI in St. Louis were the first two stations to be sold, with WVTM going for $45 million. Argyle closed on the other two stations—KDFW in Dallas and KTBC in Austin, Texas—at the start of 1994. Twelve WVTM employees lost their jobs in a reorganization spurred by Argyle in February 1994. Among them was Rosemary Lucas, a weather presenter and talk show host who had been with channel 13 for 32 years and took an early retirement.

New World Communications agreed in May 1994 to buy Argyle for $717 million. The deal's announcement coincided with the company signing a multi-market affiliation deal with Fox and came in the same month that the company had agreed to buy four other stations, including WBRC, from Great American Communications Corporation. WBRC was the station earmarked to change to Fox. So that New World could exercise its option to buy Argyle without creating a then-impermissible duopoly, WBRC was placed into a blind trust.

=== As an NBC owned-and-operated station ===
The New World–Fox deal created substantial uncertainty for WVTM as well as speculation that ABC might seek to move its affiliation to the station. The possibility of an affiliation switch disappeared in July 1995, when New World and NBC signed a 10-year agreement extending the affiliations of WVTM-TV and KNSD in San Diego in exchange for limits on affiliate compensation and New World developing syndicated programming for the NBC owned-and-operated stations, which developed as the entertainment newsmagazine Access Hollywood. On May 22, 1996, New World Communications agreed to sell WVTM-TV and KNSD to NBC for $425 million. Of that total, $250 million was estimated to represent the San Diego station. The deal came amid speculation that New World was trying to sell its 10 Fox affiliates to the Fox network itself. NBC was able to make the purchase, which brought its national coverage to 25.1%, because the Telecommunications Act of 1996 raised the national reach cap for a single station owner from 25 to 35%. Among the first changes NBC made was to begin airing The Tonight Show at 10:35 p.m. instead of delaying it; the station had delayed Tonight since at least the 1970s, using the time to air programs in which it controlled all the lucrative commercial inventory.

In June 2000, following a series of agreements with Paxson Communications Corporation, WVTM-TV began providing advertising sales support to WPXH-TV (channel 44), the Birmingham market's Pax affiliate. WPXH sales staff worked out of the WVTM-TV building, and WVTM newscasts were reaired on WPXH. Pax and NBC cut ties in 2005, putting an end to these arrangements nationwide.

=== Media General ownership ===
On January 9, 2006, NBC Television Stations announced that it would place four of its smaller-market owned-and-operated stations—WVTM; WJAR in Providence, Rhode Island; WCMH-TV in Columbus, Ohio; and WNCN in Raleigh, North Carolina—up for sale. In April 2006, Media General—owner of WIAT (the former WBMG)—was announced as the buyer of the package for $600 million, but it could only keep one of the top-four-rated TV stations in the market under FCC rules of the time. Media General opted to keep WVTM because its signal reached more households; it also was third in the market in revenue compared to WIAT in fourth. The company put four of its stations up for sale, including WIAT, to finance the purchase and meet ownership limits in the Birmingham market.

The Media General–NBC transaction closed on June 26, 2006. The FCC and Department of Justice allowed Media General to own WVTM-TV and WIAT for six months while the sale process for the latter proceeded. The transaction by which WIAT was sold to New Vision Television was finalized on October 12, 2006.

=== Hearst Television ownership ===
Media General agreed in March 2014 to buy LIN Media. LIN had previously acquired New Vision, and as a result, Media General had to once again choose whether to keep WVTM-TV or WIAT. It made the opposite decision of what it had done a decade prior, keeping WIAT and selling WVTM—along with WJCL in Savannah, Georgia—to Hearst Television in a deal announced in August and closed in December.

A subchannel of WVTM assumed the CBS affiliation for Birmingham from WIAT on August 1, 2026. WVTM was one of four Hearst-owned stations receiving CBS from Nexstar Media Group–owned stations in their markets.

== News operation ==
News was on channel 13's schedule from the beginning. In its 1949 fall season lineup, WAFM-TV aired a 30-minute newsreel produced by The Birmingham News.

For most of the 1970s and early 1980s, WAPI-TV avoided direct competition with WBRC-TV in one of early or late evening news. In 1978, WAPI-TV finally went head-to-head with WBRC (and WBMG) at 10 p.m., ending years of airing its late report at 11 p.m. The news race was between channels 6 and 13, and WBRC generally won because it had a better signal. In May 1979, WAPI had 33 percent of the full-market early and late news audiences compared to 60 and 47 percent, respectively, for WBRC. In 1979, WAPI moved its early report to 5 p.m., retitled its newscasts Action News, and hired several new personalities, including weather presenter James Spann.

Seeking to make channel 13 competitive in the market, Times Mirror made major changes to WVTM's news in the early months of its ownership, including hiring away WBRC newscaster Joe Langston and sportscaster Herb Winches in January 1981. The two were well-known in the market, having worked at WBRC for 17 and 6 years, respectively. It was the first such anchor shift in the market. The station went to two evening newscasts, at 5 and 6 p.m. The moves made WVTM truly competitive for the first time ever in Birmingham TV news, particularly in the 10 p.m. time slot, where the two stations were only several percentage points apart in audience share by July 1981. By May 1982, WVTM led at 10 p.m. by seven percentage points. After less than two years, Langston and Winches signed contracts to return to WBRC in November 1982; WVTM elected not to pursue a lawsuit against the pair for breaking their non-compete clause, with general manager Jack Harrison telling the Birmingham Post-Herald, "[W]e at Channel 13 are in the news business, we are not in the people restraining business."

Through the 1980s, WVTM and WBRC were competitive in the early and late evening news races. During part of this time, WBMG offered no newscasts at all. By 1988 and early 1989, WVTM was leading or tied in audience share with WBRC at 5, 6, and 10 p.m. Jeff Rosser, channel 13's general manager, attributed the strong ratings to his station's stability and the success NBC had in prime time.

As the decade ended, WVTM's ratings began to decline. In November 1989, abruptly, ratings surveys showed clear leads across the board for WBRC. While WVTM held narrow leads at 5 and 10 p.m. in May 1992, by 1993 WBRC had taken the lead in both time slots. The shift was attributed to changes in news anchors and the popular The Oprah Winfrey Show as a lead-in on WBRC. During this time, in 1990, WVTM debuted a morning show—Top O' the Morning, which aired at 8 a.m. after Today, and was hosted by Jenny Burleson and former WBRC weathercaster Mike Royer. In response to low support from national advertisers and changing lifestyles, the program moved to 11 a.m. in 1992 and was replaced with a more news-oriented show. With the cancellation of WBRC's similar The Morning Show the preceding year, a type of television program that had been on the air for decades in Birmingham was no more. A weekend morning newscast was added that year. The 1993 firing of Gene Lively as anchor and his replacement in the evenings by Royer, in the middle of ratings sweeps, was the first of several anchor changes, including the 1994 departure of Pam Huff and the 1995 move of Royer to host a new 6 a.m. morning show. By 1995, WBRC was beating WVTM in some time slots by a two-to-one margin or greater.

The 1996 round of affiliation switches created a new local news competitor in Birmingham: ABC 33/40, which rose in ratings over its first five years to become a close second to WBRC. Despite having fewer major changes than other area stations, WVTM was the only station to see significant declines in news viewership, falling to third place—only ahead of a resurgent and relaunched WIAT (the former WBMG). At one point in 2001, WIAT had higher ratings than WVTM on three consecutive weeknights for the first time ever. ABC 33/40 was home to popular local personalities, including Spann and Huff. The ratings decline forced changes at WVTM, which changed news directors; increased promotion of its on-air talent; and started an investigative reporting unit. A new Doppler weather radar was purchased along with new news vehicles. Audiences began to increase again. In November 2002, the station was number-one at 10 p.m. for the first time in four years. WVTM's news performance remained mixed; by 2010, it was second in early mornings, third in early evenings, and fourth—narrowly behind WIAT—in late news.

After being bought by Hearst, WVTM-TV added a 4 p.m. news hour in 2014. By 2023, the station had recovered to second in late news ratings, though still well behind WBRC.

=== Notable former on-air staff ===
- Sophia Choi – reporter and anchor, known as Sophia Richardson in Birmingham
- Jen Hale – weekend anchor and reporter, late 2000s
- Cliff Holman ("Cousin Cliff") – children's program host, 1954–1969
- James Spann – weather presenter, 1979–1984
- Rene Syler – weekend anchor, 1990–1992
- Heather Unruh – anchor and reporter, 1992–1995

== Technical information ==
=== Subchannels ===
WVTM broadcasts from a tower atop Red Mountain in Birmingham. Its signal is multiplexed:

Subchannels of WVTM-TV
Subchannel	Res.	Short name	Programming
13.1	1080i	WVTM-HD	NBC
13.2	480i	MeTV	MeTV
13.3	480i	STORY	Story Television
13.4	720p	WVTMCBS	CBS
13.5	480i	GetTV	Great
21.3	480i	COMET	Comet (WTTO)

Broadcast on behalf of another station

=== Analog-to-digital conversion ===
The station shut down its analog signal on June 12, 2009, the official digital television transition date. The digital signal then moved from UHF channel 52 to channel 13. WVTM relocated its signal to channel 7 on July 2, 2020, as a result of the 2016 United States wireless spectrum auction.
