= Windham Springs, Alabama =

Windham Springs
- Unincorporated community
- Location within the state of Alabama Windham Springs (the United States)
- Coordinates: 33°29′29″N 87°29′55″W
- Country: United States
- State: Alabama
- County: Tuscaloosa
- Elevation: 404 ft (123 m)
- Time zone: UTC-6 (Central (CST))
  - Summer (DST): UTC-5 (CDT)
- GNIS feature ID: 154008

Windham Springs, also known as Oregonia, Wyndham Springs, or Windhams Springs, is an unincorporated community in Tuscaloosa County, Alabama, United States. Windham Springs is named after the resort at the sulfur springs founded by Levi Windham in 1850. The area was once home to a two-story hotel building and several cabins. The hotel and springs were visited by many people for the springs' reputed healing qualities. During the Civil War, the hotel was looted by the Union Army. In May 1917, the hotel, a church, and multiple houses were destroyed in a tornado. A post office operated under the name Oregonia from 1848 to 1907.
