= 1994–1996 United States broadcast television realignment =

Television station affiliation switches

- Date: May 23, 1994 – September 1, 1996 (2 years, 3 months and 9 days)
- Location: United States
- Caused by: Fox outbids CBS for the National Football League (NFL) television contract in December 1993; Fox purchases a 20% equity stake in New World Communications in May 1994
- Result: News Corporation acquires New World Communications in July 1996: ABC reaches an affiliation deal with Scripps in June 1994; CBS reaches an affiliation deal with Group W in July 1994; NBC gets an O&O in Philadelphia in November 1994; UPN and The WB begin operations in January 1995; NFL returns to CBS in 1998

Parties
| News Corporation | New World Communications | Federal Communications Commission (FCC) |

Lead figures
| Rupert Murdoch (chairman) | Ronald Perelman (CEO) | Reed Hundt (chair) |

The logo of Fox Broadcasting Company from 1987 to 1993

Between 1994 and 1996, a wide-ranging realignment of television network affiliations took place in the United States as the result of a multimillion-dollar deal between the Fox Broadcasting Company and New World Communications, announced on May 23, 1994. Unprecedented in the broadcast industry, the deal resulted in twelve stations owned by, or in the process of being purchased by New World, switching network affiliations to Fox over the course of a two-year period when existing contracts expired. These stations were long-standing affiliates of the traditional "Big Three" television networks, CBS, NBC, and ABC, in some of the country's largest markets, with the majority having been aligned with CBS individually for over 40 years.

The major impetus for the changes was to allow Fox to improve its local affiliate coverage after having successfully outbid CBS for broadcast rights to the National Football Conference (NFC), which the National Football League (NFL) awarded to the fledgling network in December 1993. The alliance started a domino effect of similar deals between the other networks and their affiliates, mainly to shore up existing affiliate bases and, in the case of CBS, to recoup lost affiliates; CBS signed a critical pact with Westinghouse Broadcasting that resulted in Westinghouse's parent company purchasing CBS outright. The switches took place throughout the United States between September 1994 and September 1996, with one additional switch taking place in February 1997, in markets ranging in size from Atlanta, Georgia, to Miles City, Montana. In the case of four markets, CBS and NBC exchanged owned-stations between each other, with one market seeing their CBS- and NBC-owned stations swap both channel positions and transmitters. The complexities of these deals saw the "Big Three" affiliates in two markets, Baltimore and Denver, exchange networks with each other, but the Fox affiliate was unchanged. In total, these constitute some of the most sweeping and expansive changes in American television history.

As a result of this realignment, Fox ascended to the status of a major television network, comparable in influence to CBS, NBC, and ABC. Multiple New World–owned stations (which Fox purchased outright in 1996) struggled to adjust to their new affiliations, but many ultimately recovered with news-intensive schedules and were buoyed by Fox's success in prime time, particularly throughout the 2000s. CBS was most impacted among the "Big Three" networks, consigned to UHF stations with high channel numbers in markets like Milwaukee, Detroit and Cleveland, but started to recover in the late 1990s by claiming the American Football Conference (AFC) rights from NBC. Fox Sports, particularly the NFL on Fox, has won acclaim since its 1994 launch for innovations in game presentation, and the network's aggressive bidding in 1993 signaled long-term trends both in American television and professional sports.

== Television affiliation switches prior to 1994 ==
The traditional "Big Three" television networks

ABC

CBS

NBC

Affiliation switches led by changing fortunes at the major national networks—the traditional "Big Three" of ABC, CBS, and NBC—began in the late 1970s with the rise of ABC, which had traditionally been in third place, to number one in the national ratings. Even though ABC's national coverage alone was not a disadvantage, the quality of affiliates in larger markets was, and the network began a concerted campaign to pry loose stations associated with its competitors. From January 1976 to the end of 1978 alone, ABC secured defections from 20 affiliates of the other "Big Three" networks, 11 from CBS and 9 from NBC. By 1983, NBC alone had lost 20 affiliates to ABC, defections that cost the network a full rating point on the NBC Nightly News and resulted in the loss of $9 million in advertising revenue from Nightly and $15 million in prime time. Among the defections from NBC were a string of major coups in sizable markets: WRTV in Indianapolis; KGTV in San Diego; WSOC-TV in Charlotte; KSTP-TV in the Twin Cities; and WSB-TV in Atlanta.

However, as NBC became the number-one network in the mid-1980s, it gained the upper hand. One of the last defectors from NBC to ABC was KOTA-TV in Rapid City, South Dakota, which changed in 1984; the reversal in fortune was not what KOTA-TV officials had expected and instead brought them closer with their primary competitor. The next year, NBC began a campaign to reverse some of the losses it had experienced. Two former NBC affiliates returned to the network after short stints with ABC: WSAV-TV in Savannah, Georgia, returned after three years, as did KCEN-TV in Temple, Texas, after changing in 1984. Between then and 1988, NBC upgraded its affiliations in a number of markets, including Omaha, Nebraska; Knoxville, Tennessee; and Jacksonville, Florida. NBC president Pierson Mapes told Electronic Media that NBC was looking for upgrades based on a number of factors: "Mostly it's because the local news product isn't what it should be, the owners don't want to invest in the station to improve its performance or it's a UHF outlet that we want to upgrade." Many of the stations added to NBC were stronger than their replacements; the Knoxville station, WBIR-TV, was the dominant station there and commanded nearly half of the television audience for its early evening newscast. ABC struck back in 1990 with the signing of WHAS-TV in Louisville, Kentucky, the market's number-one station and a CBS outlet for 40 years; this attracted interest on the part of as many as a dozen CBS affiliates in switching to ABC.

In one of the largest single affiliation switches, six television stations in the Miami and West Palm Beach markets in South Florida changed affiliations on January 1, 1989, when CBS purchased Miami's Fox affiliate WCIX (channel 6) after NBC purchased Miami's CBS affiliate WTVJ (channel 4).

== Fox launches and pursues the NFL ==
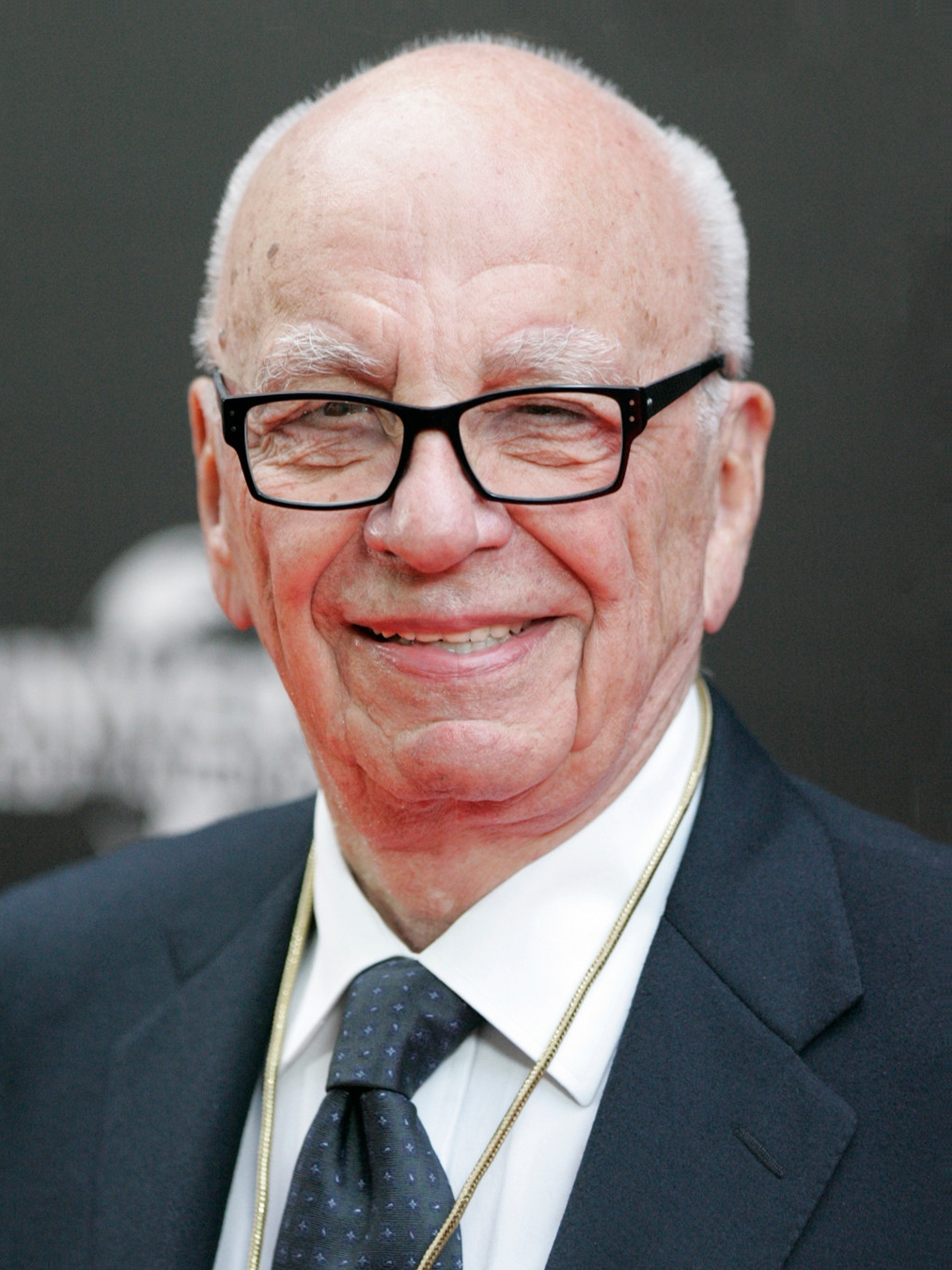
Rupert Murdoch

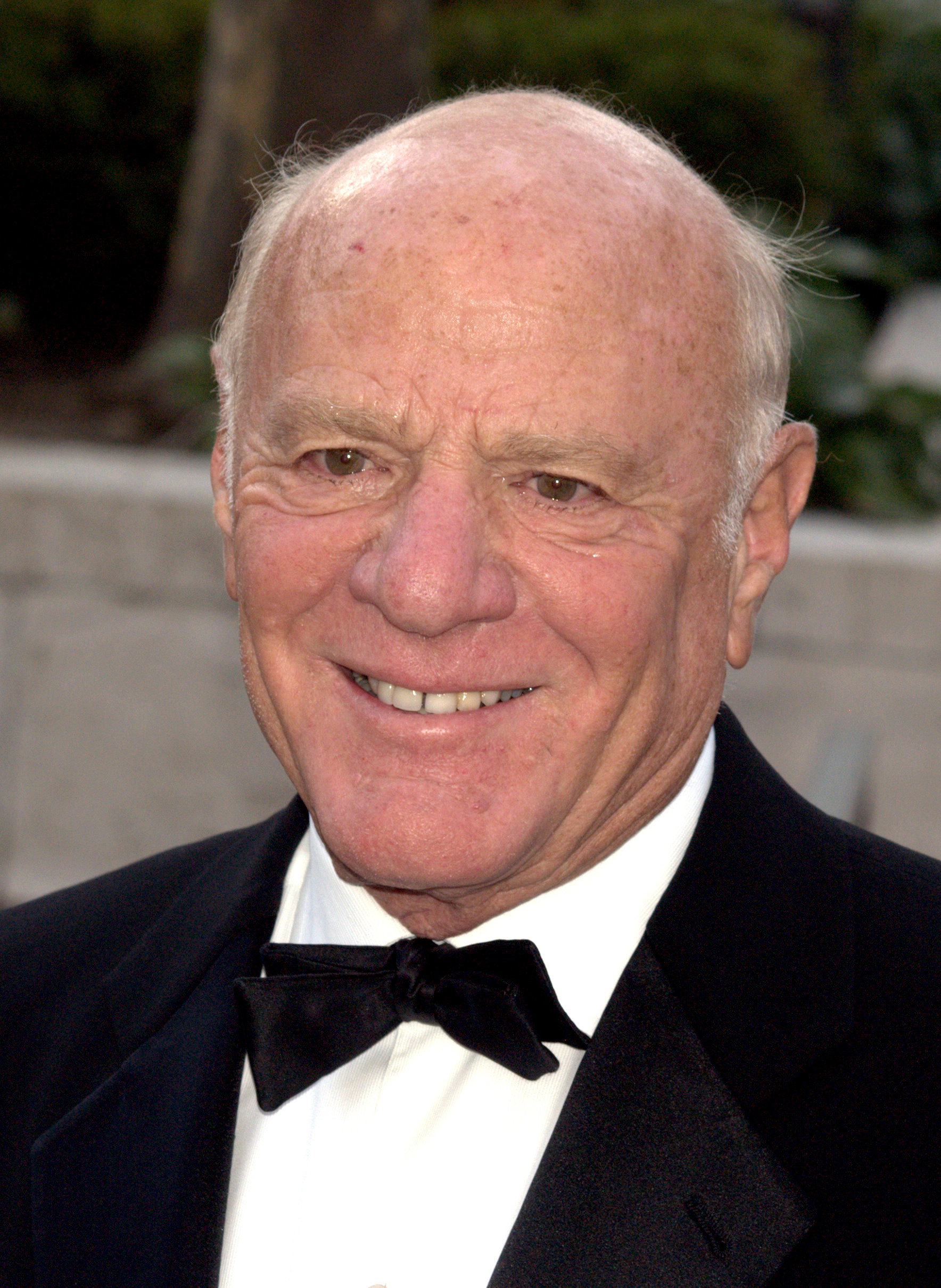
Barry Diller

The genesis of the Fox Broadcasting Company took place through two 1985 transactions made by News Corporation, headed by Australian publishing magnate Rupert Murdoch. After a failed takeover of Warner Communications, Murdoch purchased a 50% interest in 20th Century-Fox Film Corporation (TCF) on March 20, 1985, for $250 million. Murdoch and TCF minority investor Marvin Davis then announced a $2.5 billion purchase of Metromedia's program syndication unit and six television stations—including WNEW-TV in New York City, KTTV in Los Angeles and WTTG in Washington, D.C.—from John Kluge on May 6, 1985. Murdoch boasted that the Metromedia stations could exploit TCF's film and television library, prompting speculation these stations might form a new "fourth television network" alongside ABC, CBS, and NBC. To win regulatory approval for the deal, Murdoch gave up his Australian citizenship and became a naturalized U.S. citizen on September 4, 1985. Davis, who later revealed he declined to participate in the Metromedia purchase, sold his stake in TCF to Murdoch 20 days later. The Metromedia deal closed on March 6, 1986, forming Fox Television Stations Group. After consummation, Fox, which only consisted of president Jamie Kellner and his secretary, began recruiting an executive team.

In July 1986, syndicated newspaper columnist Gary Deeb reported on the possibility ABC might not renew their broadcast rights to Monday Night Football (MNF), then the league's top-rated program, unless NFL commissioner Pete Rozelle agreed to lower the television rights fee significantly. The previous contract was set in 1981 when the annual inflation was at a substantial 13%, a rate that fell to 3%–4% by 1986, in turn, causing ABC Sports to lose $40 million. ABC had been purchased earlier in 1986 by Capital Cities, owner of some of ABC's most influential affiliates, and was under pressure to cut costs in both their news and sports divisions. By September 1986, CBS, rights-holder for the National Football Conference (NFC), and NBC, rights-holder for the American Football Conference (AFC), declined any interest in MNF, but Fox considered making a bid and even invited former MNF announcer Howard Cosell to be a part of it.

Fox formally launched as a network on October 9, 1986, with the debut of The Late Show with Joan Rivers and was preparing to unveil its first night of prime time programming on April 5, 1987. (Note: The network identified itself as "FBC" in between these two dates before adopting the name "Fox" outright.) Against this backdrop, TCF chairman Barry Diller announced in January 1987 that Fox was ready to bid on MNF in an attempt to win legitimacy, telling the Miami Herald, "We would take ABC's (current) contract and sign it today." Diller viewed an MNF bid as making a long-term investment, and was prepared for Fox to "lose money in the double-digit eight figures" with such a deal buoyed by Murdoch's financial resources. ABC decided to bid for a renewal based largely on Fox's interest in MNF, with a fee reduction saving the network approximately $20 million per year and low-rated Sunday and Thursday games moved to ESPN. While Fox bid $7 million per game compared to ABC's $6.5 million per game, Rozelle was reportedly uninterested in the Fox offer as the network was still unestablished. NFL officials also expressed a willingness to remain with ABC and were unsure if Fox would exist in three years, a fate shared by other past attempts at a "fourth network".

In 1993, Fox was the Big Three networks’ bratty half-brother ... capable of simultaneously producing some of the very best and very worst shows on TV. It had The Simpsons and The X-Files. It also had Chevy Chase’s late-night talk show and a sitcom where Henry Winkler played Rush Limbaugh-lite ... That Fox saw the NFL as a way of gaining credibility was ironic. The year before, as part of its strategy of giving the finger to the old networks, Fox had aired an In Living Color special opposite CBS’s Super Bowl halftime show. Now, Rupert Murdoch was saying, he wanted the Super Bowl.

— Bryan Curtis, The Ringer

Fox largely catered to the 18–34 demographic with younger-skewing shows and an "irreverent, sometimes sophomoric" style typified by Married... with Children and The Simpsons, the latter the network's first definitive hit. Emphasis was given to Black audiences with shows like The Sinbad Show, Martin, Living Single and New York Undercover. Sketch comedy series In Living Color gained national attention for broadcasting a live episode against the Super Bowl XXVI halftime show that was a ratings success. The debut season of teen-oriented Beverly Hills, 90210 had a controversial storyline centering around the loss of a character's virginity, unprecedented in network television. Fox expanded their prime time schedule incrementally, resulting in the network programming seven nights a week by the 1993–94 season. Entering that season, Fox heavily promoted The Adventures of Brisco County, Jr. intending for it to be their next hit show, but the show that followed it on Friday night, The X-Files, became a sleeper hit instead. Fox's reputation by 1993 was still largely limited to hits like The Simpsons along with a string of failed shows that attained similar levels of notoriety. The network attempted to re-enter late night with The Chevy Chase Show but was cancelled after six weeks amid negative reviews and dismal ratings.

== Securing the NFC rights ==
In 1993, six years after Fox's failed MNF bid, the NFL opened up negotiations for all broadcast contracts, including the NFC and AFC rights. At the same time, Dallas Cowboys owner Jerry Jones and Denver Broncos owner Pat Bowlen asserted control over the NFL's broadcasting committee, usurping Cleveland Browns owner Art Modell, who had been a long-time ally of CBS. Murdoch privately called Jones and declared his intent to bid, saying, "Jerry, I think I was a stalking horse last time (in 1990). I'm not going to do that and be just a stalking horse." When negotiations began on December 7, Murdoch presented to the broadcasting committee a sizzle reel by Sky Sports president David Hill proposing Fox could produce NFL games similarly to Sky's soccer coverage, with emphasis on more cameras and in-game natural sounds, and have the network market the league year-round. Jones later said, "I was just mesmerized by their imaginative thinking. They were changing the presentation of the game."

It'll be first class. We want to make the NFL look better than what we've seen. We have the crown jewel of all sports.

— Lucie Salhany, Fox network president, on the network securing a broadcast deal for the NFL's NFC games

On December 17, 1993, Fox stunned the sports and television worlds by reaching a four-year, $1.58 billion contract with the NFL for NFC regular season and playoff games, effective with the 1994 season. News of the Fox–NFC deal was first reported on during the CBS Evening News with Dan Rather. As part of the deal, Fox was also awarded broadcast rights to Super Bowl XXXI in 1997. The NFC package had been owned by CBS since 1956—fourteen years before the AFL–NFL merger and subsequent restructuring into the NFC and the AFC—and had been considered a "cornerstone" for CBS Sports. Fox's deal was regarded as a loss leader; network CEO Chase Carey framed it as one that would not directly make money but instead establish momentum for Fox and elevate it to the "Big Three" networks. Fox had pursued the NFC rights from the beginning as the conference had more teams located in the country's largest broadcast markets.

CBS lost close to $100 million on their prior NFC deal signed in 1990, a situation shared by the NFL's other broadcast partners due to aftereffects of the early 1990s recession. Underestimating the value of the NFC broadcast rights, CBS's chairman Laurence Tisch insisted on offering a bid equal to their 1990 contract, resulting in Fox exceeding CBS's bid by as much as $1.29 billion (or more than $100 million per year). NBC, which held the AFC broadcast rights since 1970, retained the rights after a last-minute bidding war with CBS, shutting out the network from pro football entirely. Morale at CBS Sports was depicted as "somber and not optimistic", with veteran announcer Pat Summerall saying, "[I]t's a shock. It hurts. It's a big part of my life." Murdoch expressed a want to hire Summerall's broadcast partner John Madden, which happened the following month. Most of the NFL on CBS announcing team, including Summerall, Terry Bradshaw and James Brown, also left to join Fox Sports. Early financial projections for CBS owned-stations and affiliates were grim: network flagship WCBS-TV alone stood to lose $5 million a year without the NFL, with their general manager calling it "a straight drop to the bottom line". The general manager of affiliate KDFW in Dallas–Fort Worth, Texas, who at the time were in a position to lose the games of the Dallas Cowboys, called it "a big financial kick".

== Fox upgrades in small markets ==
CBS was saying to the NFL, "If you move (the NFC) rights to Fox, in these 60 [sic] cities there will be no free over-the-air broadcast of the NFL." Mr. Murdoch said, "You got to come to this meeting with the NFL TV committee." Mr. Murdoch did not tell me what he was going to say. We stand up in front of the TV committee, and he says, "Within 60 days, Preston will get a secondary affiliation with some TV station in every one of these 60 markets." I just about wet my pants.

— Preston Padden, Fox president of network distribution

Entering 1994, Fox's 141-station affiliate base remained smaller than ABC, CBS or NBC, which each boasted more than 200 affiliates; this resulted in an approximate six-percent differential in terms of national reach. The network supplied Foxnet for cable systems in smaller markets that did not have a dedicated affiliate. Some affiliates still had no local newscasts, with the prior recession resulting in Fox lessening the priority level on affiliates to establish them. One of these affiliates, WOIO in Cleveland, Ohio, initiated plans to launch a news service after seeing success with co-owned WXIX-TV in Cincinnati. While WUAB already had an established 10 p.m. newscast in the Cleveland market, an unnamed executive told the Akron Beacon Journal in 1992, "they (WOIO) don't have to get ratings, they just have to exist." Scripps-Howard Broadcasting started developing newscasts for two of their three Fox affiliates, KNXV-TV in Phoenix and KSHB-TV in Kansas City. KSHB's newscast launched in August 1993 with an irreverent tone and de-emphasis on sports and weather; likewise, KNXV was assembling their news department with an unconventional style in line with Fox's younger demographics. WOIO, WXIX, KNXV and KSHB were all UHF stations, which accounted for 85 percent of Fox's affiliate roster.

Fox also lacked coverage in 47 markets where only three or fewer commercial TV stations operated. In these markets, it began discussing secondary affiliations with the local ABC, CBS, and NBC affiliates. Though most of the CBS affiliates turned down Fox's overture, a number of small-market ABC affiliates agreed to Fox's terms, which included the carriage of at least six hours a week of Fox prime time programs. (Note: One CBS affiliate, KGAN in Cedar Rapids, Iowa, added Fox football due to the distress of the market's Fox affiliate, KOCR. KOCR was unable to construct a broadcast tower that could serve the entire market, and allowed Fox to offer the NFC package to another station. By October 1994, KOCR was forced off-air after being evicted from their facilities and failing to make electrical payments.) CBS and ABC responded by threatening to withhold 60 Minutes (in the case of CBS) and postseason baseball (in the case of ABC) from affiliates that added Fox programming. CBS president of affiliate relations Tony Malara said that if 60 Minutes did not air nationally at the same time, it would lose value to advertisers. CBS followed through with its threat; KXMB-TV in Bismarck, North Dakota, added Fox football and lost 60 Minutes for the duration of the football season. WSBT-TV in South Bend, Indiana, also signed up for Fox football and lost 60 Minutes, with CBS offering the show to WHME-TV. Dual NBC/ABC affiliate KTEN in Ada–Ardmore, Oklahoma, joined Fox on a tertiary basis to accommodate Dallas Cowboys fans and boasted a "monopoly of football" with Fox, NBC and MNF; as part of the deal, KTEN also aired select Fox prime time shows beginning in July 1994.

The network began making overtures to group operators like Freedom Newspapers, Stauffer Communications and Brissette Broadcasting about having their stations switch to Fox, mostly to upgrade in markets with UHF affiliates that reached fewer households than their VHF counterparts. (Note: For more, see UHF television broadcasting § UHF vs VHF.) Led by network distribution president Preston Padden, videotaped pitches asserted Fox affiliates could sell more local ads and generate more revenue. Several affiliate defections were announced prior to May 1994. The first was ABC affiliate KARD in West Monroe, Louisiana, announced in January 1994 with an April changeover. In April, Robinson Everett's CBS stations—KECY-TV in El Centro, California, and WJKA-TV in Wilmington, North Carolina—announced they would affiliate with Fox. Several factors motivated the Everett switch, including CBS's insistence that the stations restore previously unsuccessful news operations; a desire for more network compensation in Wilmington; and particularly CBS's refusal to make KECY-TV translator "KDBA" the CBS affiliate of record for Palm Springs, California, because it felt cable coverage of Los Angeles station KCBS-TV was adequate. WJKA, which also supplanted Foxnet in the Myrtle Beach market, switched to Fox under the new WSFX-TV call sign on September 18, 1994.

There had previously been two "Big Three" stations to join Fox: WSVN in Miami switched from NBC on January 1, 1989, and KLMG (now KFXK-TV) in Longview, Texas, switched from CBS on April 1, 1991. WSVN's conversion to Fox came under unique circumstances, as it was part of the two-market, six-station South Florida realignment. Unlike any other Fox affiliate or owned-station, WSVN adopted a news-intensive tabloid format which shattered conventional wisdom and proved a ratings and financial success. WSVN news director Joel Cheatwood briefly worked with Fox on developing a network news service in 1990, and by May 1994, Fox network president Lucie Salhany called the station "the future of television". In Longview, CBS was available on cable from its affiliates in Dallas and Shreveport, Louisiana, which outrated KLMG locally, and there was no Fox affiliate available in the market.

Fox had also occasionally changed its affiliate in a given market. Most notably, over the course of 1990, it moved to higher-rated independent stations in Birmingham, Alabama; Little Rock, Arkansas; and Memphis and Nashville, Tennessee. Consolidation among independents also led to switches such as the Nashville move, in which new affiliate WZTV bought the Fox affiliation and the rights to much of the programming aired by WXMT; the 1990 programming merger of WNYB-TV into WUTV in Buffalo, New York; the 1991 purchase of KOKH-TV in Oklahoma City by the owners of Fox affiliate KAUT-TV, who moved Fox to KOKH and donated KAUT to OETA; and the 1992 purchase of the assets of bankrupt WXGZ-TV serving Green Bay, Wisconsin, by that city's WGBA-TV.

== The New World–Fox affiliation pact ==
New World stations affected by the Fox affiliation deal
| Station | Market | Channel | Prior affiliation |
|---|---|---|---|
| KDFW | Dallas–Fort Worth, TX | 4 | CBS |
| KSAZ-TV | Phoenix, AZ | 10 | CBS |
| KTBC-TV | Austin, TX | 7 | CBS |
| KTVI | St. Louis, MO | 2 | ABC |
| WAGA-TV | Atlanta, GA | 5 | CBS |
| WBRC-TV | Birmingham, AL | 6 | ABC |
| WDAF-TV | Kansas City, MO | 4 | NBC |
| WGHP | Greensboro–Winston-Salem, NC | 8 | ABC |
| WITI | Milwaukee, WI | 6 | CBS |
| WJBK-TV | Detroit, MI | 2 | CBS |
| WJW-TV | Cleveland, OH | 8 | CBS |
| WTVT | Tampa, FL | 13 | CBS |

Originally constituted as an independent producer of low-budget feature films, and later as a television studio, New World Pictures was purchased by investor Ronald Perelman in 1989 while in the middle of a Chapter 11 bankruptcy restructuring. Under Perelman, New World purchased a majority stake in SCI Television on February 17, 1993, for $100 million and $63 million in newly issued debt. SCI contained most of the assets of the former Storer Communications and was itself undergoing a complex debt restructuring; as part of the deal, SCI and New World merged to form New World Communications. In May 1994, two major purchases were announced by New World in the span of three days: four stations from Argyle Television Holdings for $717 million and four Great American Communications stations for $350 million and $10 million in share warrants.

On May 23, 1994, Fox purchased a 20% stake in New World Communications in what was a $500 million investment. This deal contained a groupwide multi-year affiliation agreement that would have the majority of stations owned by—or in the process of being acquired by—New World, switch network affiliations to Fox after existing contracts expired per-station. Calling the agreement "the largest network affiliation realignment in television history", Murdoch said it would "forever change the competitive landscape of network television".

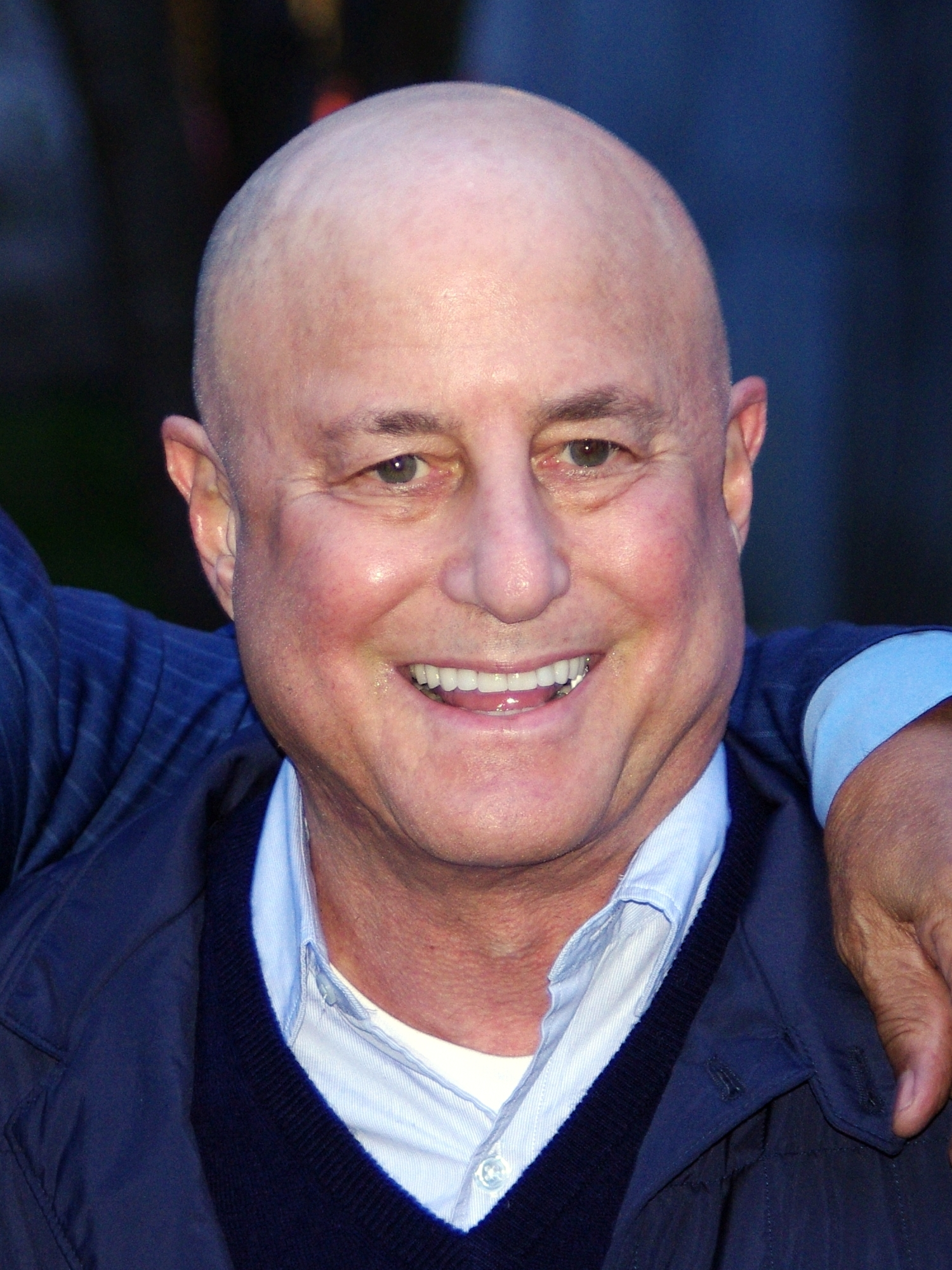
Ronald Perelman, CEO of New World Communications

Several stations were divested by New World in the process: NBC affiliates KNSD in San Diego, California, and WVTM-TV in Birmingham, Alabama, were sold to the network for $425 million on May 22, 1996. (Note: Prior to this sale, New World and NBC reached a "shows-for-stations" agreement that extended the affiliations for KNSD and WVTM for 10 years each. In turn, NBC agreed to jointly produce, and took out an equity stake in, a prime access syndicated newsmagazine that would become Access Hollywood.) WSBK-TV in Boston, operating as an independent, was excluded due to Fox's repurchase of WFXT and was sold to Paramount Stations Group, affiliating with UPN. WVTM-TV's sale was necessitated as WVTM (included as part of the Argyle Television deal) was in the same market as WBRC (which was part of the Great American deal). WBRC and WGHP were placed in a trust and operated by Great American successor Citicasters until April 1995, when operating control for both stations were transferred to Fox Television Stations Group. Fox purchased both WBRC and WGHP on July 22, 1995, in exchange for $130 million in promissory notes. Two Fox-owned stations displaced by the New World deal were also sold: WATL in Atlanta and KDAF in Dallas–Fort Worth, went to Renaissance Communications for $100 million and joined The WB, with Renaissance concurrently selling KDVR in Denver to Fox for $70 million.

In total, twelve New World-owned stations were affected by the Fox affiliation pact, eight of which were long-tenured CBS affiliates in some of the nation's largest cities. WJBK-TV had been with CBS for 46 years, KDFW for 45 years, KTBC-TV and WAGA-TV for 43 years, WJW-TV and KSAZ-TV for 40 years and WTVT for 39 years. Additionally, WDAF-TV had been an NBC affiliate for 45 years. The majority of these stations were also located in markets with established NFC teams, (Note: This does not include KTVI, which became a "home station" for the St. Louis Rams after that team's relocation from Los Angeles in 1995.) which served as "a significant factor" for New World, along with Fox's programming lineup being largely limited to prime time, enabling the stations to sell more local advertising. News of the agreement caught CBS's Tony Malara off guard when notified over the phone; as Malara later explained, "I said (to New World CEO William C. Bevins), 'In what market?' ... He said, 'All of them.' I said, 'What the hell are you doing?'" Management at the New World stations, including WJW-TV general manager Virgil Dominic, were notified of the pending deal five days in advance and sworn to secrecy. Dominic later said, "My mouth fell to my knees. There was five or six seconds of absolute silence after (New World stations president Bob Selwyn) told me. It really was a shock."

== The Scripps–ABC alliance ==
The Scripps–ABC affiliation deal at a glance
| Station | Market | Channel | Prior affiliation |
|---|---|---|---|
| WEWS-TV | Cleveland, OH | 5 | ABC |
| WXYZ-TV | Detroit, MI | 7 | ABC |
| KNXV-TV | Phoenix, AZ | 15 | Fox |
| WMAR-TV | Baltimore, MD | 2 | NBC |
| WFTS-TV | Tampa, FL | 28 | Fox |

Immediately following the Fox–New World announcement, CBS courted Scripps-Howard, owners of WEWS-TV in Cleveland and WXYZ-TV in Detroit, two long-standing ABC affiliates, along with three Fox affiliates impacted by Fox–New World: KNXV-TV, KSHB-TV and WFTS-TV in Tampa. As part of a possible deal leaked to Broadcasting & Cable, CBS would also affiliate with KNXV and WFTS and acquire a minority stake in Scripps's cable channel HGTV. In discussions with ABC, Scripps insisted that KNXV-TV and WFTS-TV, along with NBC affiliate WMAR-TV in Baltimore, switch to ABC as a condition of any renewal with WEWS and WXYZ and threatened to switch both to CBS if KNXV in particular was not included. KNXV's inclusion came at the expense of KTVK, the market leader for local news and regarded as a model ABC affiliate but was a standalone family-run station and not part of a larger group. The network offered Scripps $25 million as an alternative to KNXV-TV, which was rejected in what ABC executive Bryce Rathbone described as Scripps "[having] a gun to their head". When KTVK general manager Bill Miller asked Capital Cities/ABC CEO Tom Murphy if there was anything the station could do, Murphy replied, "you should light some candles".

ABC acquiesced to Scripps's demands and announced on June 15, 1994, that KNXV, WFTS and WMAR would join the network, and WEWS and WXYZ would remain affiliates. Scripps's other former Fox affiliate, KSHB, replaced WDAF-TV as Kansas City's NBC affiliate; KSHB was tied to contract renewals for KJRH-TV in Tulsa, Oklahoma, and WPTV-TV in West Palm Beach. The new ABC alliance prompted WFTS-TV to expedite work on establishing a news department, with local newscasts launching the day of the switch from facilities formerly used by the Home Shopping Network in a temporary setup. Stripped of the ABC affiliation and failing to land CBS, KTVK spent the next few months rebuilding itself into a news-intensive independent. Scripps's Cincinnati station, WCPO-TV, also signed a 10-year deal with ABC in September 1995 unrelated to the earlier group deal, and switched from CBS on June 3, 1996.

== The CBS–Westinghouse deal ==
The CBS–Group W affiliation deal at a glance
| Station | Market | Channel | Prior affiliation |
|---|---|---|---|
| KDKA-TV | Pittsburgh, PA | 2 | CBS |
| KPIX-TV | San Francisco, CA | 5 | CBS |
| KYW-TV | Philadelphia, PA | 3 | NBC |
| WBZ-TV | Boston, MA | 4 | NBC |
| WJZ-TV | Baltimore, MD | 13 | ABC |

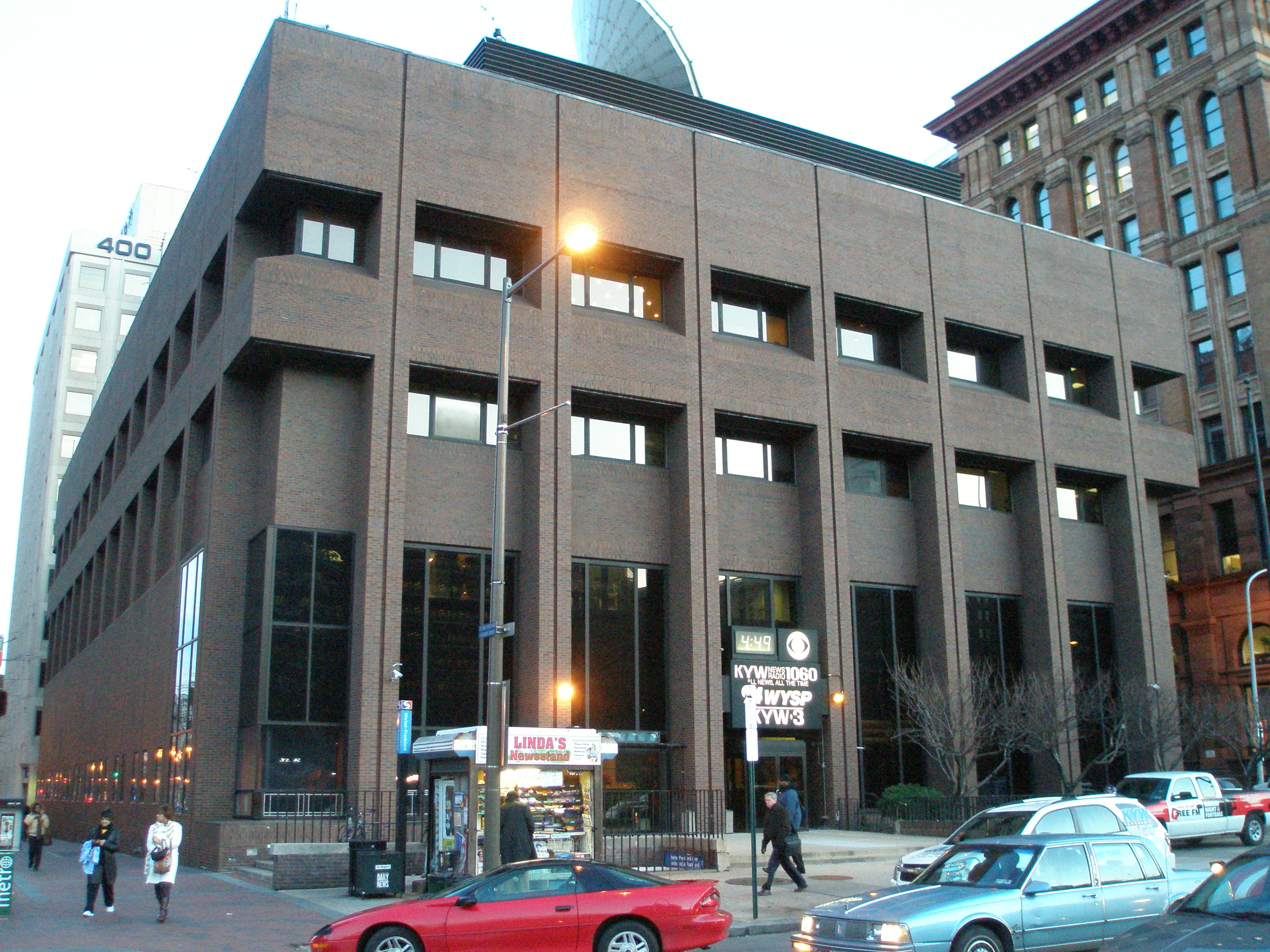
KYW-TV studios in Philadelphia, c. 2007

Scripps's insistence on WMAR-TV joining ABC came at the expense of WJZ-TV, which had been with ABC since 1948 and was the network's longest-tenured affiliate. WJZ-TV owner Westinghouse Broadcasting (Group W) engaged in off-and-on discussions over the past six months with CBS, NBC and Fox over a possible group-wide affiliation deal, which accelerated when the Scripps-ABC agreement was announced. Industry trade publications also suggested a possibility of Fox purchasing Group W.

On July 14, 1994, Group W and CBS agreed to a group-wide 10-year contract, renewing CBS's existing ties with KDKA-TV in Pittsburgh and KPIX-TV in San Francisco and adding WJZ-TV, WBZ-TV in Boston and KYW-TV in Philadelphia to the network, the latter two stations switching from NBC. As part of the deal, Group W and CBS formed a joint venture to acquire other television stations and operate a syndication company.

WJZ-TV and WBZ-TV switched to CBS on January 1, 1995, with Baltimore and Boston's existing CBS affiliates, WBAL-TV and WHDH-TV, switching to NBC, the former in a three-way affiliation swap. NBC agreed to pay WHDH-TV owner Sunbeam Television a total of $100 million to $150 million over a ten-year span, coincidentally reuniting Sunbeam with the network that had bypassed their Miami station WSVN five years earlier.

== NBC–Philadelphia Ownership ==
NBC's Ownership of Philadelphia at a glance
| Station | Market | Channel | Prior Affiliation O&O | New Affiliation O&O |
|---|---|---|---|---|
| KCNC-TV | Denver | 4 | NBC | CBS |
| KUTV | Salt Lake City | 2 | NBC | CBS |
| WCAU | Philadelphia | 10 | CBS | NBC |
| WCIX | Miami–Fort Lauderdale, FL | 6 | CBS | Channel allocations changed |
| WTVJ | Miami–Fort Lauderdale, FL | 4 | NBC | Channel allocations changed |

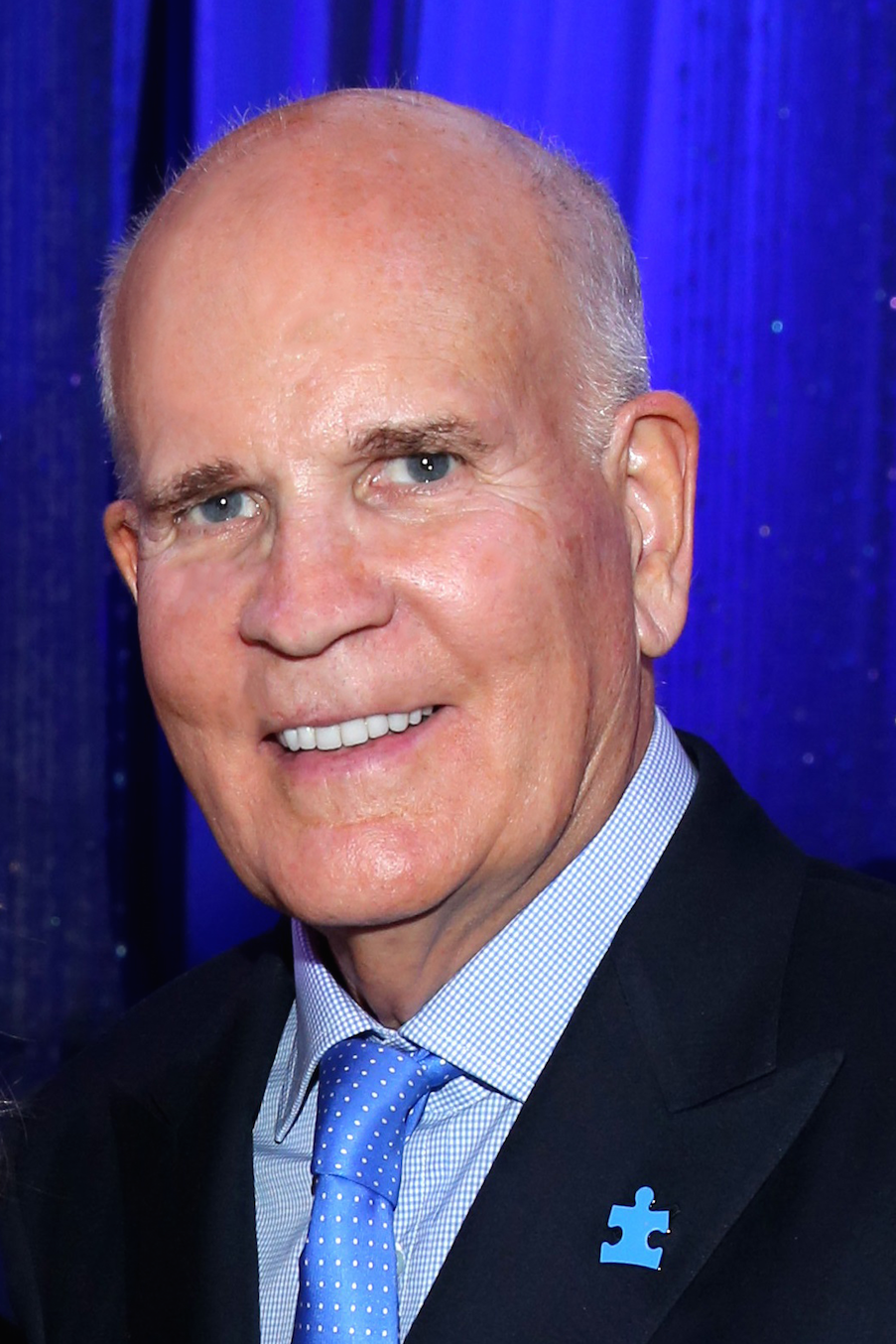
Bob Wright, president and CEO of NBC, had ownership of Philadelphia part of the network's strategic plan to stay as the highest-rated network.

The CBS–Westinghouse affiliation agreement was a severe blow to NBC because they wanted to reclaim ownership of KYW-TV in Philadelphia. NBC had owned the station from 1958 to 1965 when it was WRCV-TV, two years earlier through a trade with Westinghouse Broadcasting in return for NBC's television and radio stations in Cleveland. The FCC reversed the trade in 1965 leading to NBC to regain control of the Cleveland television station. Since then, NBC had done whatever it took to acquire an O&O in Philadelphia, especially KYW, which became its weakest major-market affiliate for much of the 1980s. Bob Wright, president and CEO of NBC, had the network's ownership of Philadelphia—and specifically KYW—part of the network owning stations in the largest markets as part of the strategic plan to keep NBC as the highest-rated network.

The affiliation agreement posed a logistical issue as KYW would replace CBS-owned WCAU-TV; consequently, Fox also made an offer for WCAU-TV, while CBS expressed interest in conducting an asset swap with NBC. In September 1994, Fox agreed to purchase existing Philadelphia affiliate WTXF-TV. With NBC remaining as the only bidder for WCAU-TV, talks began in earnest over an swap of stations between the two networks, because NBC didn't want to be relegated to a much weaker UHF station in Philadelphia.

An early outline leaked to Mediaweek had NBC offering KCNC-TV in Denver and KUTV in Salt Lake City to CBS, along with the channel 4 signal in Miami. This was largely confirmed on November 21, 1994, with NBC selling KCNC and KUTV to the Group W–CBS joint venture, along with WTVJ's channel 4 license and transmitter site; CBS would sell to NBC both WCAU-TV and WCIX's channel 6 license and transmitter site. The transmitter and license swap in Miami would see WCIX "move" to channel 4, renamed WFOR-TV, and WTVJ "move" to channel 6.

In Denver, another three-station affiliation swap took place: NBC-owned KCNC-TV became CBS-owned, outgoing CBS affiliate KMGH-TV joined ABC, and outgoing ABC affiliate KUSA linked with NBC. KMGH was part of a group-wide deal between ABC and owner McGraw-Hill announced on October 21, 1994, with McGraw-Hill's other CBS affiliate, KERO-TV in Bakersfield, California, switching to ABC on March 1, 1996. Prior to finalizing their trade with Renaissance for KDVR, Fox had been rumored to acquire Tribune's KWGN-TV via a station trade. In Salt Lake City, KSL-TV agreed to switch from CBS to NBC. Because of the complexity of the NBC-CBS asset swap, the FCC granted approval in August 1995 after weeks of delays, with the Philadelphia, Miami, Denver, and Salt Lake City market affiliation switches all taking place on September 10, 1995. NBC achieved their goal in owning a station in Philadelphia, even though they owned the station they didn't want to own in the first place. This also benefited WCAU because their sister stations would continue to be their O&O in Chicago and flagships in New York and Los Angeles—but for the first time, WCAU would also be co-owned with Washington D.C., achieving another goal of NBC to own a continuous East Coast power corridor from New York to Washington.

== CBS scrambles for replacement affiliates ==
Replacement CBS affiliates in New World markets
| Station | Market | Channel | Prior affiliation |
|---|---|---|---|
| KBVO-TV | Austin, TX | 42 | Fox |
| KPHO-TV | Phoenix, AZ | 5 | Independent |
| KTVT | Dallas–Fort Worth, TX | 11 | Independent |
| WDJT-TV | Milwaukee, WI | 58 | Independent |
| WGNX | Atlanta, GA | 46 | Independent |
| WGPR-TV | Detroit, MI | 62 | Independent |
| WOIO | Cleveland, OH | 19 | Fox |
| WTSP | Tampa, FL | 10 | ABC |

Relegated to the UHF dial in Cleveland, CBS signed former Fox affiliate WOIO, which despite having no news department, committed to launching one by taking over WUAB through a local marketing agreement. Tampa was equally straightforward, with outgoing ABC affiliate WTSP joining CBS. CBS signed up KBVO-TV (Note: Channel 42, not the current KBVO-TV licensed to Llano, Texas.) to fill the void in Austin left by KTBC-TV; when that switch took place on July 1, 1995, KBVO was renamed KEYE-TV. Dallas–Fort Worth was also resolved on July 1 via KTVT, a VHF independent owned by Gaylord Broadcasting. As a condition set forth by Gaylord, KSTW in Seattle–Tacoma, Washington, also joined CBS at the expense of long-standing affiliate KIRO-TV. Both KTVT and KSTW were slated to join The WB, but after that network's launch was delayed, Gaylord sued to void the pending contracts. In turn, The WB sued Gaylord for breach of contract. The Seattle switches took place on March 16, 1995, with KIRO-TV joining UPN but maintaining its local news schedule. (Note: KIRO-TV and KSTW exchanged network affiliations on June 30, 1997, with CBS returning to KIRO-TV and KSTW joining UPN.)

A multi-station deal with CBS and Meredith Corporation saw Phoenix independent KPHO-TV replace KSAZ-TV, and WNEM-TV in Bay City, Michigan, switch from NBC to CBS, as part of a renewal with KCTV in Kansas City. The Meredith deal resulted in another side deal: after rumors of NBC courting existing ABC affiliate WJRT-TV in Flint, Michigan, Capital Cities/ABC purchased it and WTVG in Toledo, Ohio, from SJL Broadcasting for $155 million in October 1994, converting the latter from NBC to ABC. Capital Cities/ABC's purchase was made largely to prevent NBC from signing, or purchasing, WJRT as a replacement for WNEM. As a result, former CBS affiliate WEYI-TV became Flint–Bay City's NBC affiliate. In Detroit, however, outgoing Fox affiliate WKBD-TV and independents WXON-TV and WADL rejected affiliation or purchase offers by CBS, effectively forcing the network to purchase WGPR-TV (channel 62) from the International Free and Accepted Modern Masons for $24 million. WGPR-TV was the first Black-owned television station in the mainland United States and, up until October 1992, employed an 11-person news department with daily newscasts focused on the city's Black population. Despite this, an unnamed CBS executive told The New York Times reporter Bill Carter about WGPR-TV: "[T]his station has no news and no history in the market. It's amazing."

Struggling to secure either WATL or WGNX as a replacement affiliate in Atlanta, CBS made a $22 million purchase offer for WVEU (channel 69) out of desperation in September 1994. Even with the pending deal, CBS continued to lobby WATL and WGNX, and reached an affiliation with WGNX on November 16, 1994; the purchase of WVEU and an immediate resale was also made official. Meanwhile, WVEU rebranded as WUPA and joined UPN. On June 2, 2025, it was announced that WUPA would become a CBS owned-and-operated station on August 16, 2025, replacing WANF, which converted to an independent station.

The Milwaukee market proved to be the most problematic for CBS. Sinclair Broadcast Group, owner of outgoing Fox affiliate WCGV-TV and operator of WVTV, turned down all offers made by CBS, the Wisconsin Voice of Christian Youth turned down a longshot purchase offer for their TV station, and Weigel Broadcasting, owner of WDJT-TV (channel 58) ended talks due to CBS's continued pursuit of another station. CBS's situation in Milwaukee was dire to the point the network agreed to supply their owned-stations in Chicago and Green Bay to cable providers in the event no replacement affiliate could be secured. Five days before WITI's contract was to lapse, on December 6, 1994, Weigel and CBS reached an agreement to affiliate WDJT-TV in a 10-year deal.

== Savoy, Petracom and Blackstar link with Fox ==
SF Broadcasting, Blackstar and Petracom stations
| Station | Market | Channel | Prior affiliation | Owner |
|---|---|---|---|---|
| KEVN-TV | Rapid City, SD | 7 | NBC | Blackstar |
| KHON-TV | Honolulu, HI | 2 | NBC | SF Broadcasting |
| WALA-TV | Mobile, AL | 10 | NBC | SF Broadcasting |
| WLUK-TV | Green Bay, WI | 11 | NBC | SF Broadcasting |
| WTVW | Evansville, IN | 7 | ABC | Petracom |
| WVUE | New Orleans, LA | 8 | ABC | SF Broadcasting |

In March 1994, Fox and Savoy Pictures established a venture called SF Broadcasting to acquire and operate additional television stations. Fox held no voting stock in the company—which instead was held entirely by Savoy Pictures chairmen Victor Kaufman and Lewis Korman—but supplied 58% of the original $100 million in capital. SF acquired four stations owned by Burnham Broadcasting in two separate deals: WLUK-TV in Green Bay, Wisconsin, on July 29, 1994, for $38 million, and WALA-TV in Mobile, Alabama, KHON-TV in Honolulu, Hawaii, and WVUE in New Orleans, Louisiana, one month later on August 25 for $229 million. The deal further upgraded Fox's affiliation base in two additional NFC markets. NBC protested the sale of WLUK before the FCC, alleging SF was a shell created by News Corporation to circumvent FCC limits on the amount of capital that a foreign company can invest in an American television station. This petition was soon followed with another protesting Fox's KDVR purchase and concurrent station sales in Dallas and Atlanta to Renaissance. NBC withdrew these and all other petitions against Fox on February 17, 1995. Relations between Capital Cities/ABC and Burnham soured after the SF sale, which had forced ABC to change stations in New Orleans. Burnham Broadcasting retained one station: KBAK-TV in Bakersfield, California, an ABC affiliate. After six months of negotiations with CBS affiliate KERO-TV, owned by McGraw-Hill, an affiliation switch was confirmed on August 22, 1995, and KERO-TV switched to ABC and KBAK-TV to CBS on March 1, 1996.

I sometimes think there are a lot of people out there who are giving us credit for being a lot smarter than we are. We're simply investing in companies that believe in our business plan and are attracted to affiliations with our network, just like NBC and ABC are out investing in operators who believe in their business plan.

— Preston Padden, defending Fox's investment into LLC Blackstar Communications

Fox also made two other equity investments in broadcasters that converted at least one station to Fox. In October 1994, it agreed to purchase an equity stake in Blackstar Communications, a Black-owned company owned by John Oxendine. Blackstar's three existing stations aired the Home Shopping Network; the company intended to buy as many as 11 VHF stations in mid-sized to smaller markets for conversion. The company made its first station acquisition after the deal in July 1995, when it announced a $20 million deal to purchase the Nebraska Television Network (NTV), a group of ABC affiliates in central and western Nebraska that were already secondary affiliates of Fox, to convert them to Fox. However, the transaction was delayed, ultimately to the point of being called off, by an FCC petition over a matter unrelated to the possible switch. (Note: See KLKN. At the time Blackstar attempted to acquire NTV from Fant Broadcasting, Fant was in dispute with Citadel Communications over television station allocations in Albion, Nebraska. Citadel filed a petition in hopes that it would spur the FCC into investigating an attempt by Fant to pursue the same Albion channel as Citadel. Citadel needed the new Albion channel in order to move what was then KCAN from Albion to Lincoln. The deal was then scuttled because Citadel's petition delayed FCC approval. Fant then sold NTV to Pappas Telecasting, which retained the ABC affiliation.) Blackstar then spent $14 million to purchase KEVN in Rapid City, South Dakota, in September 1995. After the purchase, Blackstar announced it would switch KEVN to Fox, which took place on July 15, 1996.

In May 1995, Fox invested $15 million in exchange for 20% of Petracom, which was in the middle of buying four television stations from Banam Broadcasting. Among the four stations were two small-market Fox affiliates (Note: One of the two Fox affiliates was KARD; the other station, KDEB-TV in Springfield, Missouri, joined Fox in 1987 after ABC terminated its affiliation the year prior. Petracom also purchased Fox affiliate WQRF-TV in Rockford, Illinois, prior to the Banam deal.) and ABC affiliate WTVW in Evansville, Indiana, which converted to Fox as part of the deal; rumors of the deal occurring had prompted ABC to sign an affiliation agreement with existing CBS affiliate WEHT. The affiliation switch with those stations and WEVV-TV, which changed from Fox to CBS, took place on December 3, 1995.

Fox also continued to pursue station purchases on their own. On August 18, 1994, the network purchased ABC affiliate WHBQ-TV in Memphis, Tennessee, from Communications Corporation of America (ComCorp). ComCorp originally bought WHBQ-TV for an estimated $43 million in April, but when two investors backed out, Fox provided the needed financing; following consummation, Fox offered to buy it from ComCorp outright for $80 million, concurrent with their offers for WBRC and WGHP; former Fox affiliate WPTY-TV assumed the ABC affiliation on December 1, 1995. More "Big Three" affiliate defections to Fox took place: Quincy Newspapers's WSJV in Elkhart–South Bend, Indiana, agreed to switch from ABC to Fox in April 1995, with ABC pulling their programming off of Quincy's WREX in Rockford, Illinois, in retaliation. The switch took place on October 18, with Weigel Broadcasting signing on W58BT (channel 58) (Note: Even with the W58BT call sign, the station was referred to as "WBND-TV" in contemporary news coverage. The WBND-LP calls were officially adopted by the end of the year.) as South Bend's new ABC affiliate, having constructed it from the ground up over a seven-week span.

Even the smallest of media markets were affected: KYUS-TV in Miles City, Montana, then operating as a satellite of Billings ABC affiliate KSVI, switched to Fox in 1995 after being purchased by The Marks Group, owner of dual NBC/CBS affiliate KXGN-TV in Glendive; KXGN had previously taken Fox football in 1994 via a tertiary affiliation.

== Station group influence ==
Additional affiliation deals between the traditional "Big Three" networks and station group operators took place between 1994 and 1997:

- The Outlet Company reached a long-term deal with NBC renewing the network's ties with WJAR-TV and WCMH-TV, while also switching WNCN in the Raleigh–Durham market to NBC. WNCN's inclusion was centered around NBC's long-standing ties with Outlet. Prior to WNCN switching, on August 3, 1995, NBC offered to purchase Outlet for $396 million.
- River City Broadcasting signed a multi-station deal with ABC that renewed contracts with WSYX and WLOS, while also making former Fox affiliate KDNL-TV St. Louis's new ABC affiliate, replacing KTVI.
- The Belo Corporation included CBS affiliate KXTV in Sacramento, California, as part of their deal with ABC that renewed affiliations with WFAA in Dallas and WVEC in Hampton–Norfolk, Virginia. As a result, River City's KOVR switched from ABC to CBS on March 6, 1995.
- Young Broadcasting signed a deal with ABC in September 1994 renewing all six of their affiliates (including Green Bay's WBAY-TV) and later involved the switching of NBC affiliate WTVO in Rockford, Illinois, to ABC; in turn, Capital Cities/ABC made a $25 million investment into Young.
- Pulitzer Publishing agreed to extend affiliations with their six NBC affiliates across-the-board despite overtures made by Capital Cities/ABC to convert WDSU and WXII-TV to ABC as replacements for WVUE and WGHP, respectively. WDSU general manager Wayne Barrett said, "My opinion was we should stay home (with NBC). The stations that don't change are the ones that stand to benefit the most."
- Allbritton Communications, owner of ABC affiliate WJLA-TV in Washington, D.C., signed a 10-year affiliation contract that would either renew or convert their entire station group to ABC, including NBC affiliate WCIV in Charleston, South Carolina.

== Initiating the switches ==
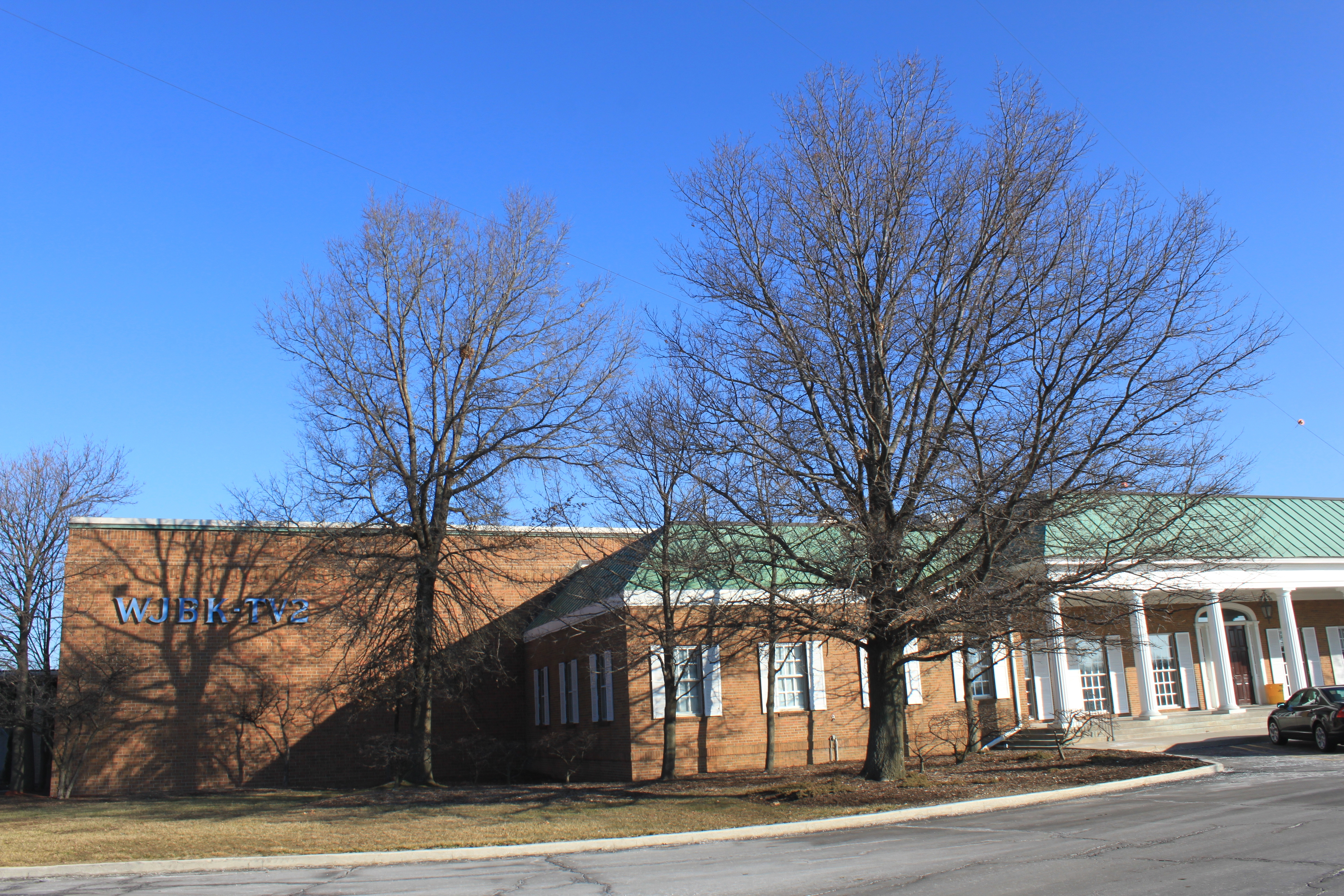
WJBK studios in Southfield, Michigan

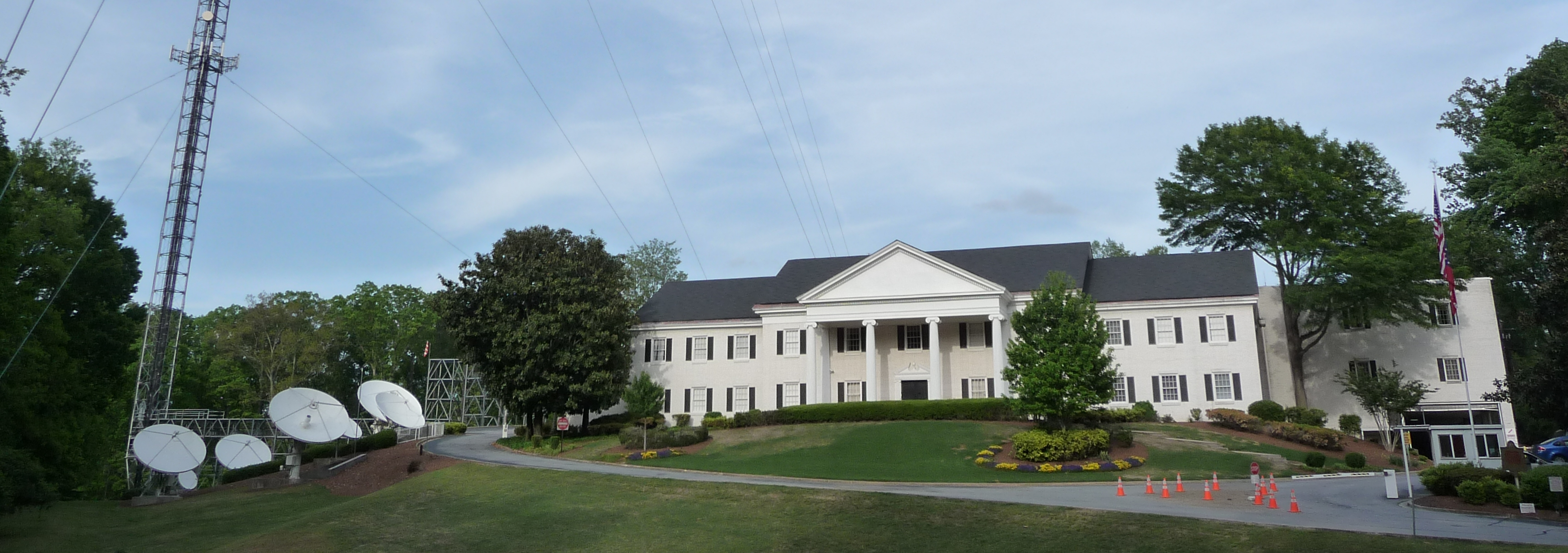
WAGA studios in Atlanta, Georgia

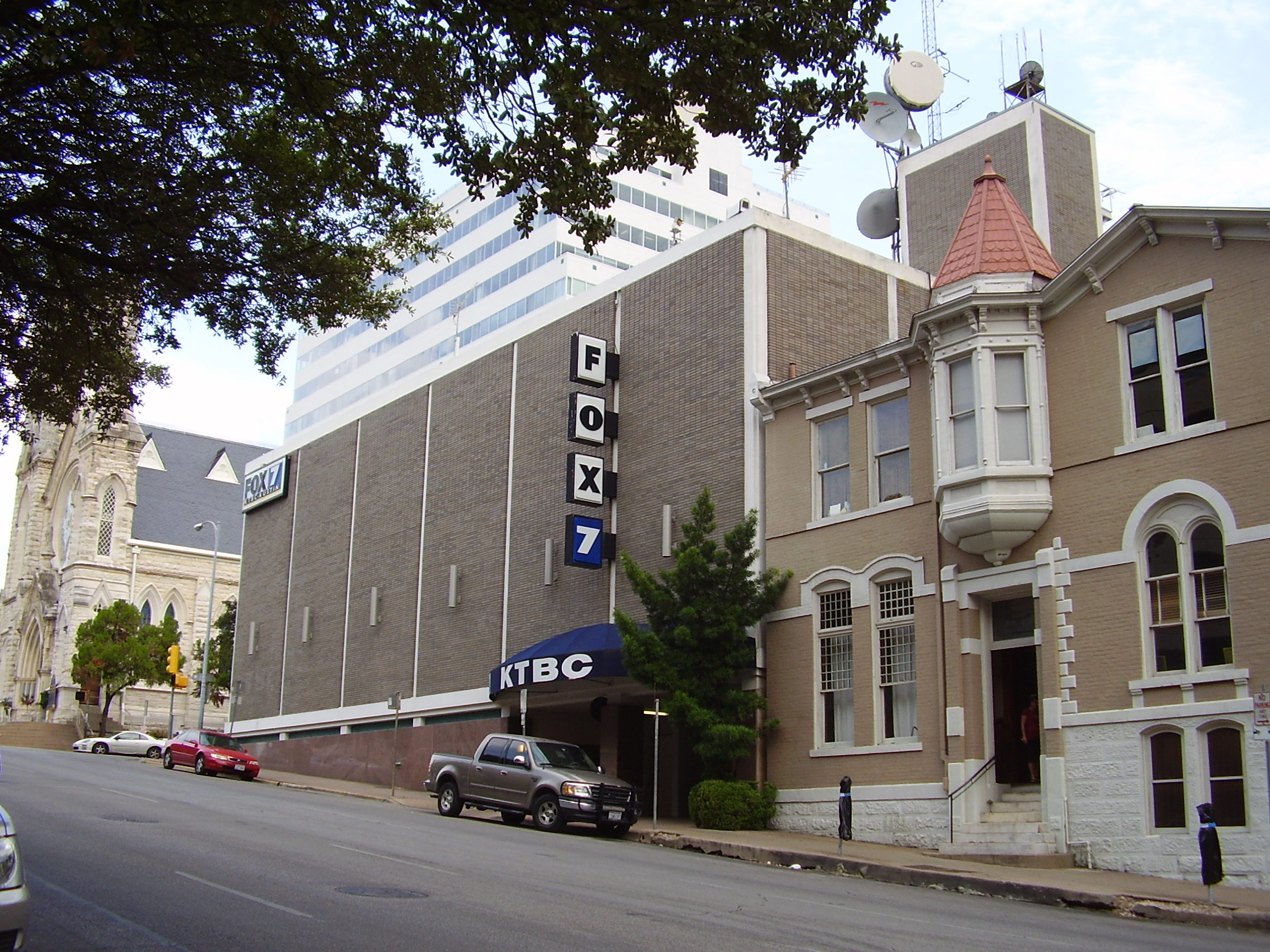
KTBC-TV studios in Austin, Texas

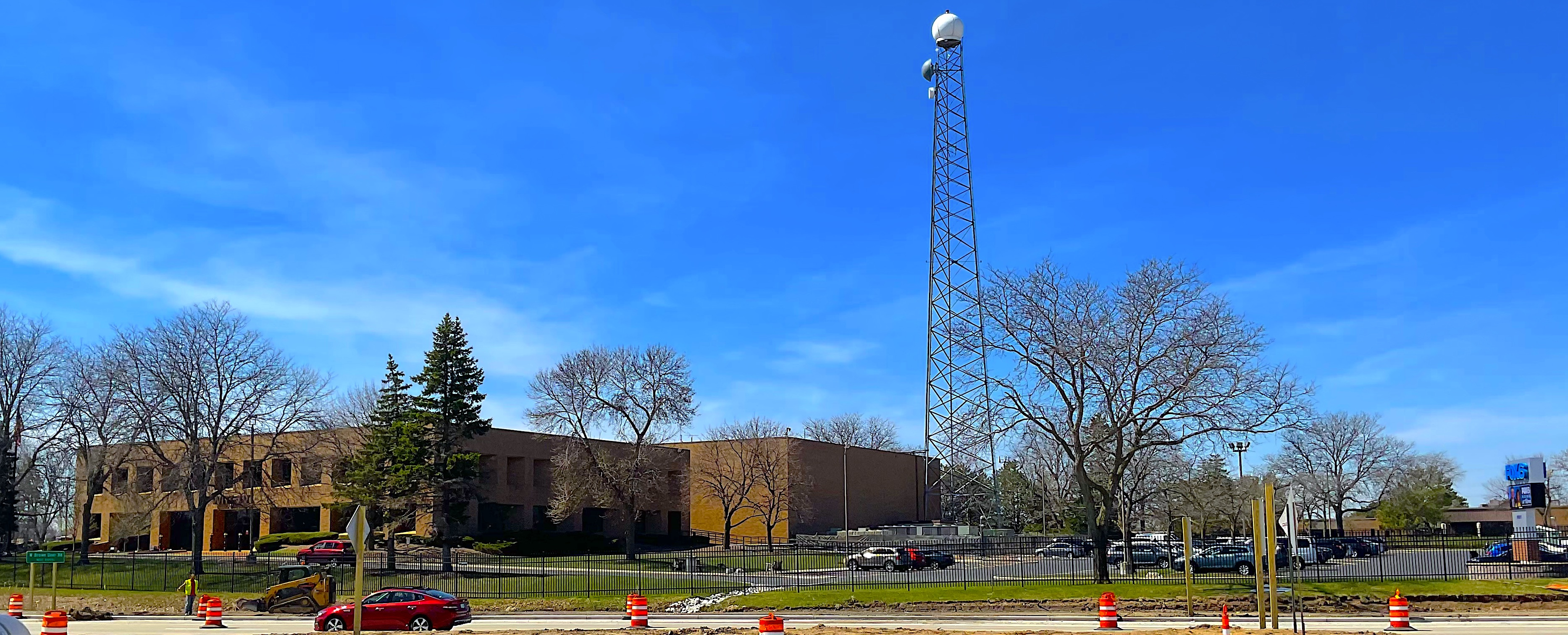
WITI studios in Milwaukee, Wisconsin

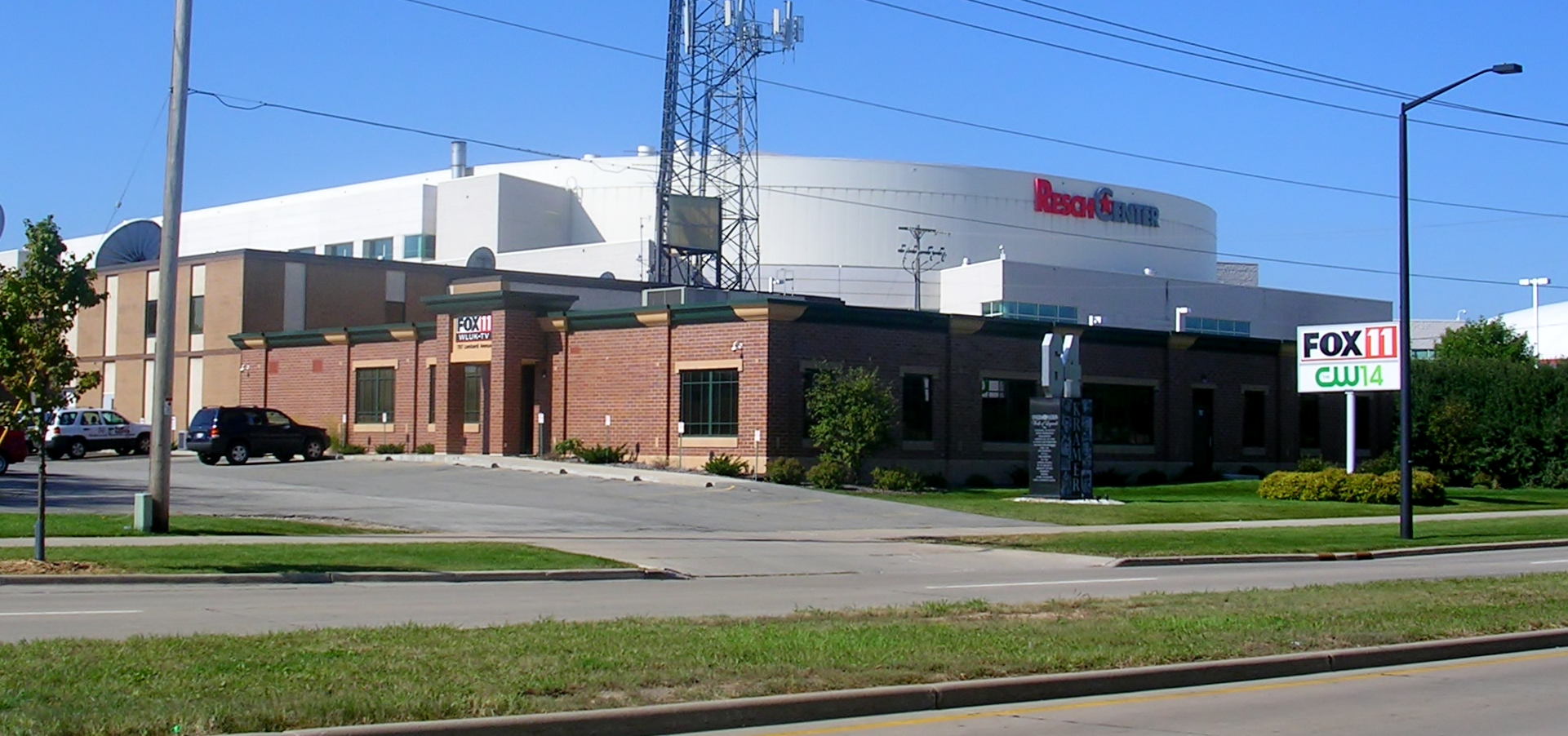
WLUK-TV studios in Green Bay, Wisconsin

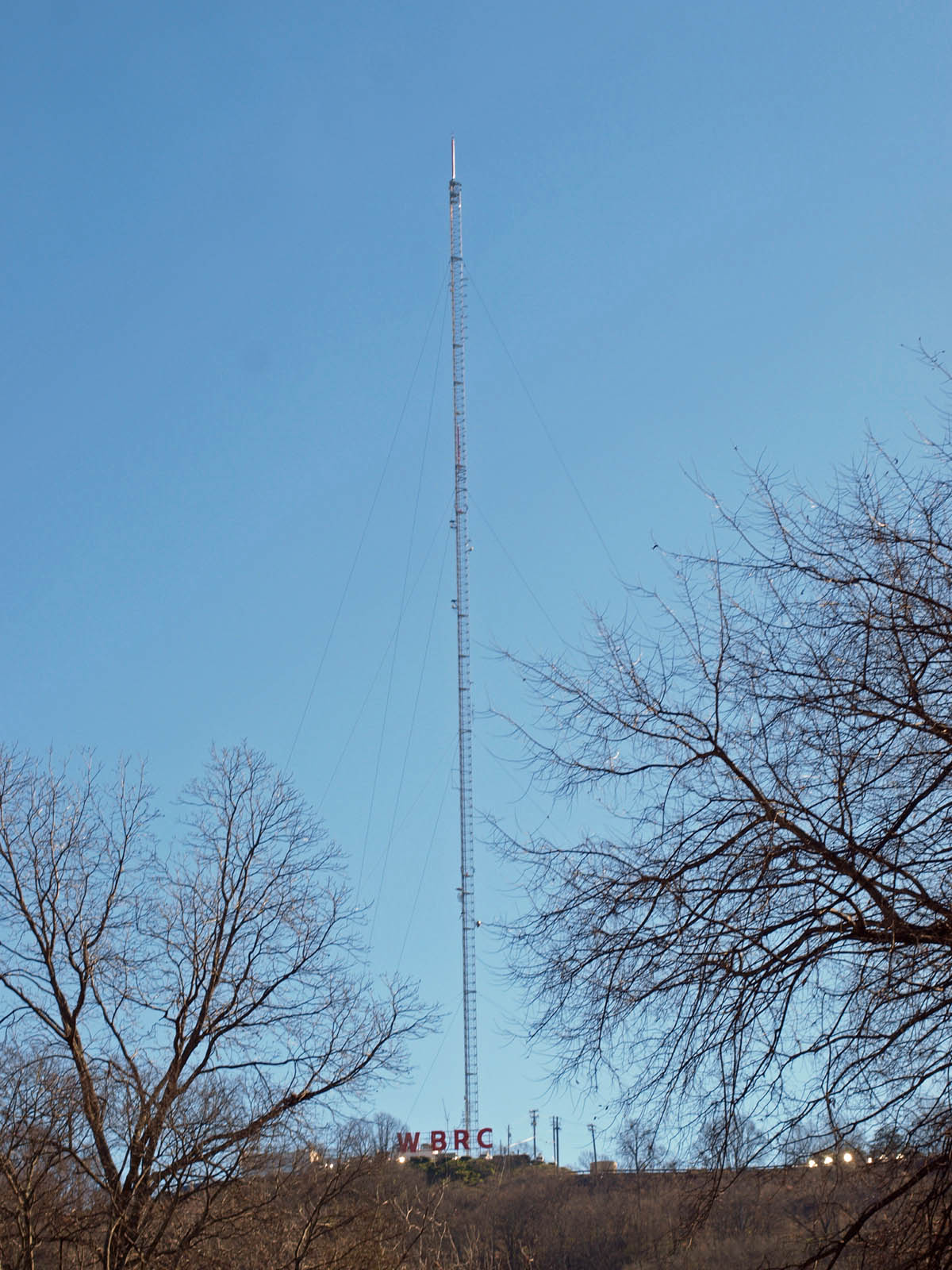
WBRC studios in Birmingham, Alabama

The Cleveland market was the first in the Fox–New World agreement to initiate an affiliation swap on September 3, 1994, between CBS affiliate WJW-TV and Fox affiliate WOIO. As the New World stations had the right to decline carriage of Fox Kids, WBNX-TV in Akron, Ohio, an independent owned by televangelist Ernest Angley, agreed to pick up the children's programming block, finalizing a contract two days beforehand. CBS expressed confidence with WOIO, with Tony Malara saying, "[W]e got a terrific television station here ... If we have the same kind of experience in every one of our switch markets, it's going to be a lot easier." With the switch, WJW-TV hired multiple personnel and added a local morning show, giving it the largest news staff and news output of any Ohio television station, but notably eschewed directly marketing their incoming Fox affiliation. Days after the Fox–New World agreement was announced, WJW general manager Virgil Dominic told The Plain Dealer, "I guarantee you one thing. We are not going to be 'Fox 8.' There is no way in the world we are going to become 'Fox 8'. We are 'Cleveland's Own' and 'Newscenter 8,' and we intend to stay that way." Conversely, WOIO was tasked with reconciling its youthful, irreverent image with CBS's older-skewing lineup.

The rest of the New World chain switched in a staggered manner. WDAF-TV and KSHB-TV traded affiliations on September 12, 1994, the same day KSAZ-TV's CBS contract ran out and was picked up by KPHO-TV. Due to contractual obligations with KNXV-TV, KSAZ operated as an independent for a three-month interregnum until December 12, when KNXV dropped Fox and picked up all ABC News programming, including World News Tonight and Nightline, while KTVK continued to run ABC's daytime and prime time lineups until January 9, 1995. Tampa also switched on December 12, while Detroit, Milwaukee and Atlanta all had their affiliation switches the day before. Detroit's changes were the most dramatic largely because of WGPR-TV's prior obscurity: WGPR's ratings for its first night with CBS rose by 11,000 percent compared to its former programming, while CBS's ratings dropped by 25 percent. Following the switch, WJBK-TV fielded 10,000 phone calls from viewers over a two-day span.

Changes in Dallas and Austin occurred on July 1, 1995. St. Louis followed on August 7; Fox Kids in that market went to KNLC after WB affiliate KPLR-TV turned it down, only to move to KTVI in September 1996 after multiple incidents involving KNLC's religious ownership that embarrassed Fox, including a campaign to encourage children to protest a planned execution, and complaints over its poor signal. Greensboro–Winston-Salem, North Carolina, switched on September 3, 1995, with Fox affiliate WNRW and satellite WGGT picking up the ABC affiliation vacated by WGHP, (Note: WXLV and WGGT also carried UPN on a secondary basis until September 1, 1996, when WGGT was converted to full-time UPN affiliate WUPN.) with WNRW renamed WXLV-TV. (Note: The renaming was done with the blessing of the widow of former channel 45 staffer William Norbert Rismiller, which inspired the WNRW calls after he was murdered in 1984. Ownership established a college scholarship in his name, and a planned newsroom was named in his honor.) Three days before the Greensboro market switches, WLUK-TV and WGBA-TV exchanged NBC and Fox in Green Bay. WGBA's NBC pickup was seen as a "triumph" for the station, which had previously fought off bankruptcy twice, and with ownership planning local newscasts. The three other SF Broadcasting stations switched to Fox on January 1, 1996. In Honolulu and Mobile, former Fox affiliates KHNL and WPMI-TV assumed the dropped NBC affiliations, but New Orleans saw a three-way swap where ABC affiliate WVUE joined Fox, WB affiliate WGNO took ABC, and Fox affiliate WNOL-TV linked with the WB.

Birmingham was the last New World market to switch on September 1, 1996, but initiated the most complicated realignment. Despite having completed their purchase of WBRC in July 1995, Fox honored the balance of WBRC's ABC contract, allowing ABC nearly 15 months to find a replacement. Allbritton acted to buy two CBS affiliates outside of the market: (Note: Tuscaloosa and Anniston were annexed from the Birmingham DMA by Arbitron in 1977, and eventually were collapsed back into that market by Nielsen in September 1998.) Tuscaloosa's WCFT-TV in November 1995 and Anniston's WJSU-TV in January 1996, the latter after a deal for Gadsden Fox affiliate WNAL-TV fell through. Allbritton announced both stations would be converted to ABC for the Birmingham market, this would later become part of Allbritton's 10-year, group-wide contract with ABC. WCFT and WJSU's operations were consolidated into one identity, "ABC 33/40", purchasing W58CK (channel 58) as a low-power simulcast in Birmingham proper. WNAL-TV switched to CBS at the same time, but plans to establish a news department with multiple former WJSU staffers were abruptly suspended with no reason; two weeks after the switch, Paxson Communications purchased WNAL. Outgoing Fox affiliates WTTO and semi-satellite WDBB became independents before affiliating with The WB in February 1997 as part of a larger group deal with owner Sinclair Broadcast Group.

The Allbritton–ABC agreement would wind up affecting another market, as Allbritton was in the process of purchasing WBSG-TV in Brunswick, Georgia, the WB affiliate for Jacksonville, Florida. Allbritton announced that WBSG would become Jacksonville's ABC affiliate, usurping WJKS; as WBSG's signal did not cover the entire market, an unbuilt station on channel 25 licensed to Orange Park was acquired. WJKS contested the loss of their ABC contract until giving up in August 1996, but it began aggressively preempting the majority of the network lineup starting in January 1997; this forced WBSG's switch to be moved up from April to February. The Orange Park station—taking the WJXX call sign—took to the air as the new Jacksonville ABC affiliate on February 9, 1997, with WBSG acting as a semi-satellite.

As the Birmingham switches were imminent, News Corporation offered to purchase the remainder of New World for $2.48 billion in stock; once the deal closed on January 22, 1997, Fox's 22 owned-stations (ten of which were from New World) surpassed CBS and Tribune Broadcasting as the largest television station owner in the United States with an estimated 40 percent total market reach. (Note: Fox sold WJW, KTVI, WDAF-TV, WITI, WBRC and WGHP, along with WHBQ-TV, KDVR and KSTU, to Local TV LLC on December 21, 2007, for $1.1 billion. WITI was repurchased by Fox in November 2019 as part of a larger transaction involving Nexstar Media Group, which acquired Local TV successor Tribune Broadcasting. WHBQ-TV, along with WFXT, were traded to Cox Media Group in June 2014 in exchange for San Francisco affiliate KTVU and independent KICU-TV.) Silver King Communications (then the owned-station group for HSN) acquired Savoy Pictures and SF Broadcasting on November 28, 1995. Headed by former TCF chairman Barry Diller, Silver King's purchase set off industry speculation that Diller could potentially launch another broadcast network backed by the 31-station group. The four Fox affiliates were ultimately sold to Emmis Communications on April 1, 1998. (Note: As part of Emmis's divestment of their television portfolio, WLUK and WALA were sold to LIN TV and KHON was sold to Montecito Broadcast Group. WVUE's sale was complicated and delayed due to damage sustained by Hurricane Katrina, with New Orleans Saints owner Tom Benson purchasing the station in 2008.)

Affiliation switches directly attributed to the Fox–New World agreement and related transactions
| Market | Call sign | Channel | Affiliation before switch | Affiliation after switch | Date of switch |
|---|---|---|---|---|---|
| Atlanta, GA | WAGA-TV | 5 | CBS | Fox | December 11, 1994 |
| Atlanta, GA | WATL | 36 | Fox | The WB | December 11, 1994 |
| Atlanta, GA | WGNX | 46 | Independent | CBS | December 11, 1994 |
| Atlanta, GA | WNEG-TV | 32 | Independent | CBS | October 2, 1995 |
| Austin, TX | KTBC | 7 | CBS | Fox | July 1, 1995 |
| Austin, TX | KBVO | 42 | Fox | CBS | July 1, 1995 |
| Bakersfield, CA | KERO-TV | 23 | CBS | ABC | March 1, 1996 |
| Bakersfield, CA | KBAK-TV | 29 | ABC | CBS | March 1, 1996 |
| Baltimore, MD | WMAR-TV | 2 | NBC | ABC | January 2, 1995 |
| Baltimore, MD | WBAL-TV | 11 | CBS | NBC | January 2, 1995 |
| Baltimore, MD | WJZ-TV | 13 | ABC | CBS | January 2, 1995 |
| Binghamton, NY | WICZ-TV | 40 | NBC | Fox | April 4, 1996 |
| Birmingham–Tuscaloosa–Anniston, AL | WBRC-TV | 6 | ABC | Fox | September 1, 1996 |
| Birmingham–Tuscaloosa–Anniston, AL | WDBB | 17 | Fox | Independent | September 1, 1996 |
| Birmingham–Tuscaloosa–Anniston, AL | WTTO | 21 | Fox | Independent | September 1, 1996 |
| Birmingham–Tuscaloosa–Anniston, AL | WCFT-TV | 33 | CBS | ABC | September 1, 1996 |
| Birmingham–Tuscaloosa–Anniston, AL | WJSU-TV | 40 | CBS | ABC | September 1, 1996 |
| Birmingham–Tuscaloosa–Anniston, AL | WNAL-TV | 44 | Fox | CBS | September 1, 1996 |
| Birmingham–Tuscaloosa–Anniston, AL | W58CK | 58 | Independent | ABC | September 1, 1996 |
| Boston, MA | WBZ-TV | 4 | NBC | CBS | January 2, 1995 |
| Boston, MA | WHDH-TV | 7 | CBS | NBC | January 2, 1995 |
| Charleston, SC | WCBD-TV | 2 | ABC | NBC | August 19, 1996 |
| Charleston, SC | WCIV | 4 | NBC | ABC | August 19, 1996 |
| Cincinnati, OH | WCPO-TV | 9 | CBS | ABC | June 3, 1996 |
| Cincinnati, OH | WKRC-TV | 12 | ABC | CBS | June 3, 1996 |
| Cleveland, OH | WJW-TV | 8 | CBS | Fox | September 3, 1994 |
| Cleveland, OH | WOIO | 19 | Fox | CBS | September 3, 1994 |
| Dallas–Fort Worth, TX | KDFW-TV | 4 | CBS | Fox | July 1, 1995 |
| Dallas–Fort Worth, TX | KTVT | 11 | Independent | CBS | July 1, 1995 |
| Dallas–Fort Worth, TX | KDAF | 33 | Fox | The WB | July 1, 1995 |
| Dallas–Fort Worth, TX | KXTX-TV | 39 | The WB | Independent | July 1, 1995 |
| Denver, CO | KCNC-TV | 4 | NBC | CBS | September 10, 1995 |
| Denver, CO | KMGH-TV | 7 | CBS | ABC | September 10, 1995 |
| Denver, CO | KUSA-TV | 9 | ABC | NBC | September 10, 1995 |
| Detroit, MI | WJBK-TV | 2 | CBS | Fox | December 11, 1994 |
| Detroit, MI | WKBD-TV | 50 | Fox | UPN | December 11, 1994 |
| Detroit, MI | WGPR-TV | 62 | Independent | CBS | December 11, 1994 |
| Evansville, IN | WTVW | 7 | ABC | Fox | December 2, 1995 |
| Evansville, IN | WEHT | 25 | CBS | ABC | December 2, 1995 |
| Evansville, IN | WEVV-TV | 44 | Fox | CBS | December 2, 1995 |
| Fairbanks, AK | KATN | 2 | ABC / NBC | ABC | February 26, 1996 |
| Fairbanks, AK | KTVF | 11 | CBS / NBC | NBC | April 1, 1996 |
| Fairbanks, AK | K13XD | 13 | —N/a | CBS | August 7, 1996 (Note: Co-owned KFXF, the Fox affiliate, aired selected CBS programs in the interim.) |
| Flint–Bay City–Saginaw, MI | WNEM-TV | 5 | NBC | CBS / UPN | January 16, 1995 |
| Flint–Bay City–Saginaw, MI | WEYI-TV | 25 | CBS | NBC | January 16, 1995 |
| Green Bay–Appleton, WI | WLUK-TV | 11 | NBC | Fox | August 28, 1995 |
| Green Bay–Appleton, WI | WGBA-TV | 26 | Fox | NBC | August 28, 1995 |
| Greensboro–Winston-Salem, NC | WGHP | 8 | ABC | Fox | September 3, 1995 |
| Greensboro–Winston-Salem, NC | WNRW | 45 | Fox | ABC / UPN | September 3, 1995 |
| Greensboro–Winston-Salem, NC | WGGT | 48 | Fox | ABC / UPN | September 3, 1995 |
| Honolulu, HI | KHON-TV | 2 | NBC | Fox | January 1, 1996 |
| Honolulu, HI | KHNL | 13 | Fox | NBC | January 1, 1996 |
| Jacksonville, FL | WJKS | 17 | ABC | The WB | February 9, 1997 |
| Jacksonville, FL | WBSG | 21 | The WB | ABC | February 9, 1997 |
| Jacksonville, FL | WJXX | 25 | —N/a | ABC | February 9, 1997 |
| Kansas City, MO | WDAF-TV | 4 | NBC | Fox | September 12, 1994 |
| Kansas City, MO | KSHB-TV | 41 | Fox | NBC | September 12, 1994 |
| Macon, GA | WGXA | 24 | ABC | Fox | January 1, 1996 |
| Macon, GA | WPGA-TV | 58 | Fox | ABC | January 1, 1996 |
| Marquette, MI | WBKP | 5 | —N/a | ABC | October 30, 1996 |
| Marquette, MI | WLUC-TV | 6 | ABC / NBC / Fox | NBC | October 30, 1996 |
| Memphis, TN | WHBQ-TV | 13 | ABC | Fox | December 1, 1995 |
| Memphis, TN | WPTY-TV | 24 | Fox | ABC | December 1, 1995 |
| Miami–Fort Lauderdale, FL | WCIX | 6 | Channel allocations changed | | September 10, 1995 |
| Miami–Fort Lauderdale, FL | WTVJ | 4 | Channel allocations changed | | September 10, 1995 |
| Miles City–Glendive, MT | KYUS-TV | 3 | ABC | Fox | 1995 |
| Milwaukee, WI | WITI-TV | 6 | CBS | Fox | December 11, 1994 |
| Milwaukee, WI | WCGV-TV | 24 | Fox | UPN | December 11, 1994 |
| Milwaukee, WI | WDJT-TV | 58 | Independent | CBS | December 11, 1994 |
| Mobile, AL | WALA-TV | 10 | NBC | Fox | January 1, 1996 |
| Mobile, AL | WPMI | 15 | Fox | NBC | January 1, 1996 |
| Monroe, LA–El Dorado, AR | KARD | 14 | ABC | Fox | April 17, 1994 |
| Myrtle Beach–Florence, SC | WGSE | 43 | The WB | Fox | November 10, 1996 |
| New Orleans, LA | WVUE-TV | 8 | ABC | Fox | January 1, 1996 |
| New Orleans, LA | WGNO | 26 | The WB | ABC | January 1, 1996 |
| New Orleans, LA | WNOL | 38 | Fox | The WB | January 1, 1996 |
| Philadelphia, PA | KYW-TV | 3 | NBC | CBS | September 10, 1995 |
| Philadelphia, PA | WCAU-TV | 10 | CBS | NBC | September 10, 1995 |
| Phoenix, AZ | KTVK | 3 | ABC | The WB | January 9, 1995 |
| Phoenix, AZ | KPHO-TV | 5 | Independent | CBS | September 12, 1994 |
| Phoenix, AZ | KSAZ-TV | 10 | CBS | Independent | September 12, 1994 |
| Phoenix, AZ | KSAZ-TV | 10 | Independent | Fox | December 12, 1994 |
| Phoenix, AZ | KNXV-TV | 15 | Fox | ABC | December 12, 1994 |
| Pocatello–Idaho Falls, ID | KPVI-TV | 6 | ABC | NBC | January 1, 1996 |
| Pocatello–Idaho Falls, ID | KIFI-TV | 8 | NBC | ABC | January 1, 1996 |
| Providence, RI | WLNE-TV | 6 | CBS | ABC | September 10, 1995 |
| Providence, RI | WPRI-TV | 12 | ABC | CBS | September 10, 1995 |
| Raleigh–Durham, NC | WNCN | 17 | The WB | NBC | September 10, 1995 |
| Raleigh–Durham, NC | WRDC | 28 | NBC | UPN | September 10, 1995 |
| Rapid City, SD | KEVN-TV (Note: And its satellite, KIVV in Lead, South Dakota.) | 7 | NBC | Fox | July 15, 1996 |
| Rapid City, SD | KNBN-LP | 24 | —N/a | NBC | July 15, 1996 |
| Reno, NV | KRXI-TV | 11 | —N/a | Fox | December 3, 1995 |
| Reno, NV | KAME-TV | 21 | Fox | UPN | December 3, 1995 |
| Rockford, IL | WREX | 13 | ABC | NBC | August 14, 1995 |
| Rockford, IL | WTVO | 17 | NBC | ABC | August 14, 1995 |
| St. Louis, MO | KTVI | 2 | ABC | Fox | August 7, 1995 |
| St. Louis, MO | KDNL-TV | 30 | Fox | ABC | August 7, 1995 |
| Sacramento, CA | KXTV | 10 | CBS | ABC | March 6, 1995 |
| Sacramento, CA | KOVR | 13 | ABC | CBS | March 6, 1995 |
| Salt Lake City, UT | KUTV | 2 | NBC | CBS | September 10, 1995 |
| Salt Lake City, UT | KSL-TV | 5 | CBS | NBC | September 10, 1995 |
| San Antonio, TX | KABB | 29 | Independent | Fox | January 16, 1995 |
| San Antonio, TX | KRRT | 35 | Fox | UPN | January 16, 1995 |
| Seattle–Tacoma, WA | KIRO-TV | 7 | CBS | UPN | March 13, 1995 |
| Seattle–Tacoma, WA | KSTW | 11 | Independent | CBS | March 13, 1995 |
| South Bend, IN | WSJV | 28 | ABC | Fox | October 18, 1995 |
| South Bend, IN | W58BT | 58 | —N/a | ABC | October 18, 1995 |
| Tampa–St. Petersburg, FL | WTSP | 10 | ABC | CBS | December 12, 1994 |
| Tampa–St. Petersburg, FL | WTVT | 13 | CBS | Fox | December 12, 1994 |
| Tampa–St. Petersburg, FL | WFTS-TV | 28 | Fox | ABC | December 12, 1994 |
| Terre Haute, IN | WBAK-TV | 38 | ABC | Fox | January 31, 1995 |
| Toledo, OH | WTVG | 13 | NBC | ABC | October 28, 1995 |
| Toledo, OH | WNWO-TV | 24 | ABC | NBC | October 28, 1995 |
| Tupelo–Columbus–West Point, MS | WLOV-TV | 27 | ABC / Fox | Fox | October 10, 1995 |
| Twin Falls, ID | KKVI-TV | 35 | ABC | Fox | January 22, 1996 |
| Wilmington, NC | WJKA-TV | 26 | CBS | Fox | September 18, 1994 |
| Yuma, AZ–El Centro, CA | KECY-TV | 9 | CBS | Fox | September 18, 1994 |
| Yuma, AZ–El Centro, CA | KSWT | 13 | ABC | CBS | September 18, 1994 |

== Ramifications ==
=== Distress at CBS, then recovery ===
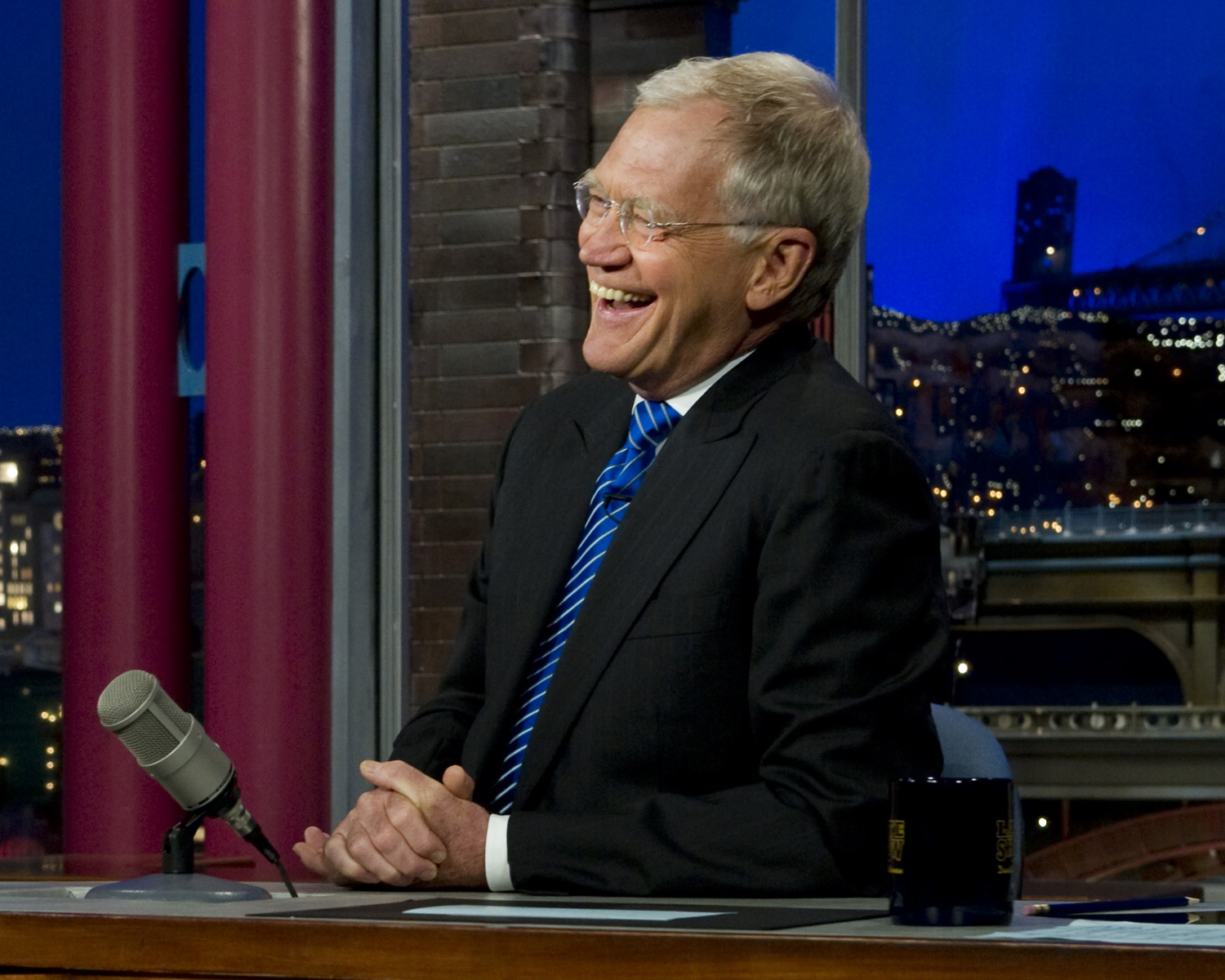
David Letterman

CBS's position entering the 1994–95 television season was particularly dire. The loss of the NFC and multiple tenured affiliates, combined with a long-held strategy of pursuing older, less-desirable audiences in prime time, resulted in the network crashing to last place among the "Big Three".

Upon moving to CBS from NBC in August 1993, David Letterman's Late Show enjoyed a lead over The Tonight Show with Jay Leno in the late-night ratings. With CBS having to move from established affiliates to lesser-known UHF outlets, that lead began to shrink. "You can do a great show, but if it's on Channel 93 in West Tipton, Indiana, it's not going to be easy to find it," Letterman commented on the switches. Jay Leno's July 1995 interview with actor Hugh Grant following the actor's infamous arrest for lewd conduct resulted in Tonight taking the top spot and remaining there until Leno stepped down in 2009. Laurence Tisch began exploring a sale of CBS amid the turmoil, with Westinghouse announcing a $5.4 billion purchase of the network on August 1, 1995. (Note: The Westinghouse buyout was announced one month before WPRI-TV in Providence, Rhode Island, which CBS purchased in March 1995 for $80 million, was to switch affiliations from ABC to CBS; WPRI was spun off to Clear Channel Communications for $68 million on April 14, 1996.) Westinghouse CEO Michael H. Jordan credited a growing relationship with Tisch thanks to their joint venture that made the deal possible. (Note: The first iteration of Viacom bought CBS for $36 billion in September 1999, but split into separate entities in December 2005, Viacom and CBS Corporation. CBS Corporation re-merged with Viacom in 2019 to form ViacomCBS, renamed Paramount Global in 2022.) On October 2, 1996, network flagship WCBS-TV fired much of its on-air talent including longtime anchor Michele Marsh, a move meant to address the station's low ratings.

... the negative impact was so severe that CBS went to the NFL and said, 'Name your price and we'll pay whatever to get a package.' We lost affiliates, ratings, the male audience and a lot of sports sponsorships. But when CBS got the NFL back (in 1997), everything picked up again.

— Neal Pilson, former CBS Sports president

CBS attempted to fill the void left by the NFL on Sunday afternoons in 1994 with made-for-TV movie reruns aimed at a female audience. By December 1994, the network announced a contract renewal with the NCAA, particularly for the Division I men's basketball tournament, a franchise CBS had held since 1982. CBS Sports also presented a higher emphasis on NASCAR programming including the Winston Cup, Busch Series and Craftsman Truck series, along with the PGA Tour and US Open. In late 1995, CBS was approached by the CFL about a television contract for the league's American teams. Sean McManus was appointed as president of CBS Sports in November 1996, which was interpreted as the network intending to bid aggressively for the NFL for the next rights deal, as McManus had a reputation for being the "kingpin of big TV negotiations". CBS successfully outbid NBC for the AFC contract on January 13, 1998, signing an eight-year contract worth $4 billion; NBC Sports president Dick Ebersol was told by General Electric officials not to do anything "reckless" and saw the package as third-tier behind the NFC and MNF. The return of football was especially seen as a comeback vehicle for Jim Nantz, one of the few high-profile sports announcers that remained with CBS throughout.

=== New World stations struggle to adapt ===
It's pretty much a flop in every category.

— Dave Walker, television writer for The Arizona Republic, assessing the aftermath of KSAZ-TV's switch to Fox

The New World Fox stations struggled to reconcile their new network programming, which targeted a younger audience, with their older-skewing newscasts. In Phoenix, KSAZ-TV's existing 5, 6, and 10 p.m. newscasts lost half their ratings in the first year of the switch. In dumping the popular syndicated shows Jeopardy! and Wheel of Fortune because they attracted older viewers, the station lost a valuable lead-in and lead-out around its newscasts. The two shows were then picked up by KTVK, which showed unexpected aggression in buying syndicated programs. KTVK also launched the market's first longform morning newscast, which emerged a winner as KSAZ-TV's effort struggled. It was not until 1997 that the station began to turn around its news ratings by dropping its sputtering 9 p.m. Arizona Prime in favor of Fox 10 News at 9, which featured an emphasis on breaking news and entertainment stories designed to be more compatible with Fox prime time shows.

In Cleveland, WJW-TV's issues were fairly pronounced. WJW's switch came with three months notice and altered more than 20 hours of programming per day, or 87 percent of the schedule. Ratings declined in all time slots but especially fell by half for the late-evening news after moving from 11 p.m.—a time slot WJW had won in since 1981—to 10 p.m., but still topped WUAB's newscast. WJW's morning show also failed to retain the audience of its lead-in 6 a.m. news. Virgil Dominic retired in May 1995 and was replaced by KNXV general manager Bob Rowe; under Rowe, the station rebranded to "Fox is Ei8ht" / "Ei8ht is News" in November 1995, a slogan derided among viewers for its continuous on-air repetition. The morning newscasts were retooled into a three-hour program and had its audience double year-over-year during the first month, while WJW saw ratings increases in several dayparts. Fox's purchase of New World resulted in WJW rebranding as "Fox 8" in August 1996. By 1998, WJW was beating WUAB at 10 p.m. by a 2–1 margin and in 2000 was ranked first sign-on to sign-off in multiple key demographics, besting WEWS.

In Milwaukee, WITI had been the market's second-rated outlet generally in May 1994. However, its ratings sank after the affiliation switch, with the 10 p.m. news, which was retained, dropping by roughly half. Initially resisting changes to their CBS-era presentation, WITI rebranded as "Fox is Six" / "Six is News" in November 1995, parallel to WJW's "Ei8ht" rebranding, but kept its long-running "Friend You Can Count On" slogan. By 1997, WITI was rebounding in local ratings, but it still fell short of their pre-switch levels and remained in third place by 2000. Atlanta's WAGA was the number two station leading into the affiliation switches. Its new 10 p.m. newscast held most of the viewers of its prior 11 p.m. broadcast, which The Atlanta Journal-Constitution TV critic Phil Kloer attributed to the station's strength and news anchors. The station remained in second place by 2000, though it was a distant second to longtime Atlanta ratings powerhouse WSB-TV, an unchanged ABC affiliate.

WBRC in Birmingham weathered the switches well and by 2000 was the highest-rated Fox-owned station in morning, evening, and late news, as well as prime time. Uniquely, the station initially produced separate half-hour newscasts at 9 and 10 p.m. because it lacked the resources to produce 90 minutes of late news. However, its 5 and 10 p.m. newscasts placed a close second to the new WBMA. WBMA also benefitted from the immediate acquisition of meteorologist James Spann, who sued to be released from his WBRC contract objecting to Fox programs on moral and religious grounds. WBRC anchor Brenda Ladun also filed suit against the station seeking a contract release and followed Spann to WBMA. WGHP remained the number-two station in the North Carolina Piedmont in its early evening and morning newscasts, though its 10 p.m. news initially fared poorly in comparison to the 11 p.m. news it aired as an ABC affiliate. By 2000, the WGHP 10 p.m. newscast had doubled its audience share from 9 percent in November 1995 to 17 percent, with a higher rating than the 11 p.m. newscasts on market leader WFMY-TV and WXII-TV.

They probably tried to do too much too fast.

— John Spinola, WJBK general manager, on prior management's intentions to make the station a local form of CNN

In Tampa, WTVT lost its first-place position among the market's local television newscasts to NBC affiliate WFLA-TV, the only station in the market not affected by the switches, whose newscasts had placed second. It was the first time since 1989 that WFLA-TV had swept the ratings. WFLA also became the market's number-one station in total viewing in every sweeps period until November 1998, when WTVT surpassed it. WJBK in Detroit was a third-rated station before the switch, attracting just over half of the audience as primary competitors WDIV-TV and WXYZ-TV. While its 10 p.m. news surpassed incumbent WKBD-TV, the 6 p.m. newscast was beaten by entertainment programming on that station. WJBK returned to the 11 p.m. news race in May 1995 with Bonds Tonight, hosted by former WXYZ anchor Bill Bonds, but was moved to 6:30 p.m. in September and canceled by mid-November due to low ratings. WJBK's overall poor ratings performance following the switch also saw its 4 p.m. news eliminated and multiple staffers laid off. In Austin, KTBC's news ratings slumped significantly in the years after the Fox affiliation switch, while third-place KXAN-TV there began a climb to the top; KEYE-TV even outdrew KTBC in assorted dayparts.

KDFW was the third-rated news outlet in Dallas–Fort Worth prior to the switches. It saw immediate year-over-year declines in the viewership for its 6 and 10 p.m. newscasts; KDFW, which retained its 10 p.m. news in addition to a 9 p.m. news hour, saw notable late news declines because the prior newscast was a poorer lead-in than CBS entertainment programming. By 2000, KTVT had pulled into a dead heat with KDFW for third place. WDAF-TV, a third-rated station in local news in its last years as an NBC affiliate, remained in third but saw significant declines in news viewing in the aftermath of its switch and doubling of weekday news output. Its 10 p.m. news went from attracting 23 percent of TV viewers at that hour to 13 percent, and the station's new morning news attracted just over half the audience share of The Today Show, which it replaced. In prime time, however, WDAF largely outperformed the national average for Fox affiliates. WDAF maintained their NBC-era "Newschannel 4" branding until being renamed "Fox 4" in 1997 after Fox assumed ownership. It was still in third place at the end of the decade. KTVI also remained a third-rated news outlet in St. Louis. It did not introduce a 9 p.m. newscast until August 1997 and remained third in its market by 2000.

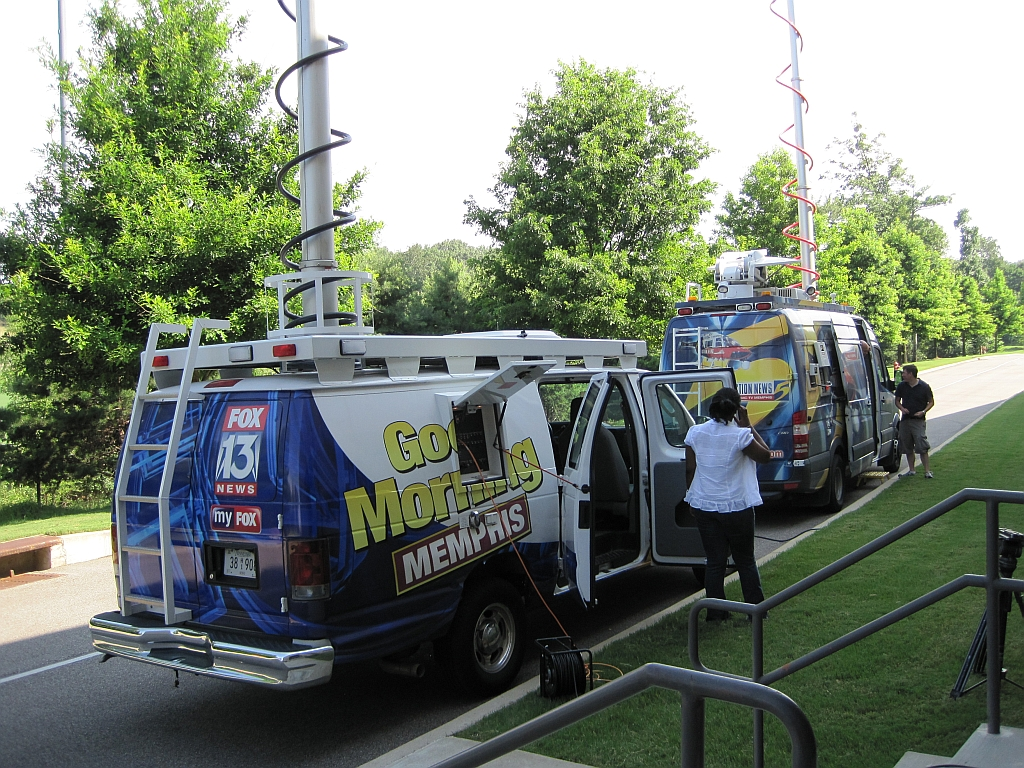
A WHBQ-TV ENG van parked next to a van for WMC-TV. WHBQ's competitiveness improved with Fox's investments, but the station could not surpass market leaders WMC-TV or WREG-TV.

Though not owned by New World, WHBQ-TV in Memphis was in a similar position. Prior to the switch, it was only producing half-hour newscasts at 6 and 10 p.m. Coinciding with the switch, its weekday news output quadrupled with the introduction of a two-hour morning newscast, Mornings on Fox, and the reinstatement of a noon newscast after nearly three years; the early evening news was moved to 5 p.m. and the late news to 9 p.m., both an hour in length. However, WHBQ-TV continued to rank third in Memphis behind WMC-TV and WREG-TV, the traditional first- and second-place news outlets in Memphis.

A cultural conflict largely existed between the New World stations and Fox. Stations like KSAZ, WJW, WDAF and WITI continued news presentations similar to their "Big Three" affiliations, which analysts saw as unsustainable with younger-skewing Fox shows like Party of Five as lead-ins. Fox Entertainment president John Matoian told The Plain Dealer in July 1995 that the network was planning to expand beyond their original target 18–34 demographic, which was partly based on stations like WJW refusing to identify with the network. By the time Fox purchased New World, the stations were seen as underperformers, largely attributed to station managers unwilling to embrace their new affiliations. WITI news director Jill Geisler was known for stressing a "fair, concerned, balanced position" at the station, while Virgil Dominic was seen as "avuncular" in his stewardship of WJW. One financial analyst suggested incoming Fox management would drastically overhaul the stations and "obviously make 'em full-blown Fox monsters". Fox chairman Chase Carey said, "Without question, the [New World] stations could be performing better than they are today."

=== The local news production boom ===
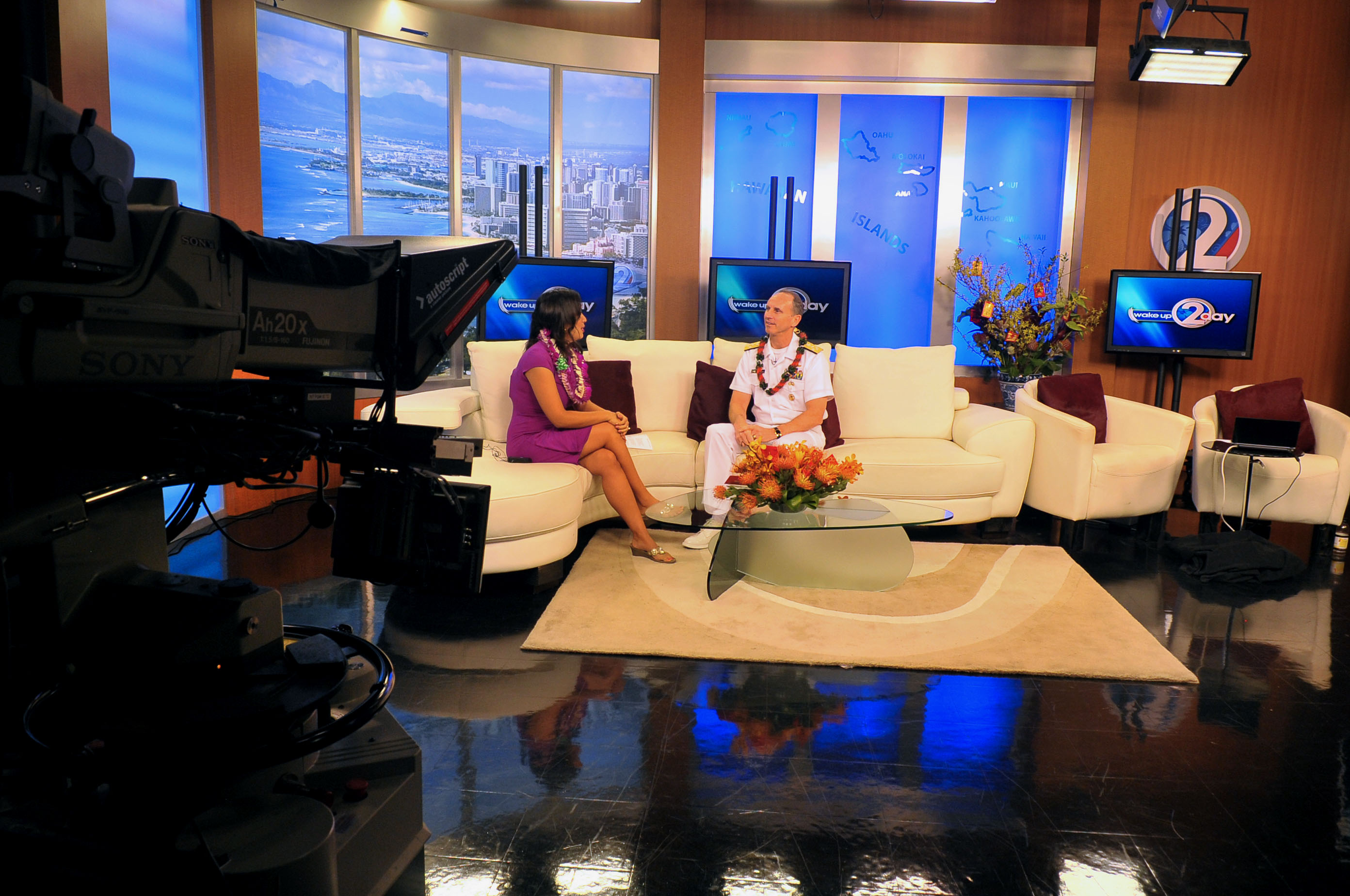
An interview segment at KHON-TV. A former "Big Three" affiliate that switched to Fox in 1996, KHON invested heavily into a news-intensive operation.

The New World stations all committed to increased local news production when they switched to Fox. This was partly out of necessity, as Fox only programmed a two-hour prime time program block, but also because the stations stood to generate more revenue selling local advertising. While with CBS, WJW could only sell two minutes of local ads during the 10 p.m. hour, which increased to 16 minutes after their late news moved to that hour. Industry analysts cited WSVN's success with a news-intensive format: having more control over programming and advertising, WSVN generated more revenue than it ever had with NBC. Precedent also existed: when a dispute over revenue compensation emerged between CBS and the affiliate body in 1992, WAGA and WJBK dropped CBS This Morning in favor of local morning shows. When CBS debuted the Late Show in 1993, WJW delayed it to midnight in favor of Murphy Brown reruns and later the New World-produced Valley of the Dolls—shows during which they could sell additional local advertising—to the network's chagrin; CBS president of affiliate relations Tony Malara later said, "The fact of the matter is, it ain't exactly chopped liver we're offering." (Note: KMEG in Sioux City, Iowa, also refused to carry the show at first after due to the ratings and financial success of their syndicated fare in late night but cleared it live the following year.)

By June 1994, Fox was still in the planning stages for a network news service, (Note: The creation of Fox News was formally announced on January 30, 1996, and the cable channel was launched on October 7, 1996. Fox News Sunday debuted over the Fox network on April 28, 1996.) but Rupert Murdoch dismissed the idea of a nightly evening newscast similar to the "Big Three" networks airing over Fox, saying, "I don't think people watch them very much. People prefer watching a newscast edited and customized for them in their communities." The New World stations gained access to a news sharing service among Fox owned-stations and affiliates while also retaining existing CNN Newsource affiliations, simulcasting CNN in the event of breaking news. WDAF, WJBK, KTBC and KHON launched nightly half-hour newscasts with emphasis on national and international coverage, but produced locally. Most of the New World stations moved their late-evening newscasts by an hour and extended them to 60 minutes in length (due to Fox only programming for two hours), or in the cases of WDAF and WITI, created a 90-minute long newscast. WBRC initially had separate half-hour newscasts at 9 and 10. KTVI and KTBC were exceptions: KTVI moved their late-evening news from 10 to 9 p.m. in 1997, while KTBC did the same in 2002; for the latter, the newscasts replaced sitcom reruns in the 9 p.m. hour. KHON maintained a late-evening newscast at 10 p.m. until September 2014, when a 9 p.m. newscast was launched.

A number of people thought we'd fall off the face of the earth. But we've proven them wrong. As far as WAGA is concerned, we'll continue to grow. We wouldn't add people if we didn't believe in what WAGA is doing. There will be no slowing down; we'll continue to grow and grow and grow.

— Budd McEntee, WAGA-TV news director

An unprecedented level of hiring took place among both the New World stations and the replacement "Big Three" affiliates to account for the overall increase in local news, with as many as 1,500 to 2,000 jobs being created during this period. In Cleveland, WJW boasted a news staff of over 120 people, while WOIO used WUAB's news department as the foundation for their own, moving both stations to new facilities at Reserve Square. Kansas City saw KSHB add 54 people to create a workforce of 72, while WDAF doubled their news staff for a total of 110. WNCN hired 68 full-time staffers in 1995 as they prepared to take the NBC affiliation, WGNX increased their headcount to 50 after linking with CBS, and WHBQ bolstered their staffing from 28 to 55 under Fox ownership. Technical advancements were also made with the increased manpower. WBMA boasted all-digital equipment when their news room launched, with Allbritton executive John Hillis saying, "We had the luxury of a clean sheet on paper." Spurned by ABC, KTVK invested heavily into syndicated programming and newsroom staffing and broke ground on new studios to house their expanded operations.

Among unchanged Fox affiliates, Sacramento's KTXL began hiring staff and extended their late-evening news to an hour, and KOKH-TV in Oklahoma City began assembling a news staff for a 1996 launch. KOKH's entry was a complete reversal from June 1994, when general manager Harlan Reams publicly expressed no desire to do local news, saying, "From a business standpoint, if you want to watch news, hey, watch 4, 5 and 9, watch CNN, read the newspaper. But I'm here to entertain." "Big Three" affiliates in unchanged markets like KVBC in Las Vegas and KIVI-TV in Boise, Idaho, also saw their news output increased with additional staffing. Ball State University professor Bob Papper estimated in 1996 that several thousand more jobs could be created if other older Fox affiliates started local news, or expanded their output to match up with the New World stations.

=== Ratings headwinds for new news operations ===
Many of the new "Big Three" affiliates, which had been either former Fox affiliates or independents on the UHF dial with no news presence, found difficulty garnering ratings traction against their traditional VHF competitors. While most of these replacement affiliates have maintained local news production, with some even experiencing gradual ratings growth, some stations eventually cancelled or outsourced operations outright.

Among CBS's replacement affiliates, WGPR-TV (renamed WWJ-TV) proved to be the network's biggest challenge. A $1 million promotional blitz saw the network's star talent make fun of the station's embarrassingly high channel number, but ratings for network programming in Detroit fell 46 percent year-over-year following the switch. CBS announced plans to establish a news department in Detroit in late 1995, only to withdraw them entirely after several months. Two attempts at local news in 2001 and 2009 failed before the station launched its third and ongoing news operation in January 2023. Unlike WWJ-TV, WOIO, WGNX and WDJT-TV were all successful in debuting local news after linking with CBS, but still struggled against established competition. Until relaunching with a tabloid format in 2002, WOIO was beset by continued talent instability and dismal ratings. This distinction was shared by WGNX despite a 1998 sale to Meredith, a renaming to WGCL-TV in 2000, multiple rebrands, and continual executive upheaval. When succeeding owner Gray Television relaunched WGCL as WANF in 2022, for Atlanta News First, management conceded the station had no brand at all. WDJT-TV's fortunes have been mixed: the station has thrived in prime time since picking up Jeopardy! and Wheel of Fortune as a lead-in, but its news operation continues to trail the competition.

...in St. Louis, the landscape for news is always treacherous, especially for a station like KDNL. News viewership here is deeply entrenched, with television watchers overwhelmingly choosing KSDK and KMOV. Read a ratings report from 10 years ago, or even 20, and the substance is very much the same: Channel 5 in first place, and Channel 4 battling to go ahead but never quite managing.

— Gail Pennington, St. Louis Post-Dispatch

Replacement ABC affiliates KDNL-TV and WXLV-TV experienced severe difficulty establishing a news presence and had their efforts shut down by owner Sinclair Broadcast Group. KDNL's newscasts, which debuted prior to the switch, struggled to gain viewership amid repeated changes in management, on-air talent and news sets, with ABC network programming equally underperforming. Barry Baker, chief executive of former owner River City Broadcasting, held an option to sell their St. Louis holdings and sold it to Emmis Communications in June 1999, sparking a year-long lawsuit between Sinclair and Emmis. (Note: The sale also included Sinclair's six St. Louis radio stations also inherited from River City; as part of a court settlement, Sinclair divested these radio stations to Emmis and retained KDNL.) The lawsuit forced KDNL onto an austerity budget cancelling the 5 p.m. news, while a failing transmitter repeatedly forced the station off-air. The 5 p.m. news was restored in October 2000 but failed to register any measurable audience, while the 10 p.m. news drew half the ratings as Friends reruns on KPLR, resulting in the news department's disbanding on October 12, 2001. WXLV-TV, which frequently failed to make progress in area ratings against the more established WFMY-TV, WGHP and WXII-TV, had its morning and weekend newscasts cancelled in late 2000 and ultimately shuttered outright on January 11, 2002. Utilizing Sinclair's hybrid News Central format, an 11 p.m. newscast ran from 2004 to 2005, when it was again scrapped due to poor ratings. In February 2012, Spectrum News 1 North Carolina (then known as News 14 Carolina) began producing daily newscasts for WXLV as part of a retransmission consent dispute settlement between Time Warner Cable and Sinclair. Spectrum News newscasts continued to air on WXLV until 2019, then resumed local newscasts in January 2021, albeit produced by KABB in San Antonio.

This was not limited to new CBS, NBC, or ABC affiliates in New World markets. KHNL in Honolulu began airing newscasts on April 12, 1995, more than eight months before switching to NBC. The station's newscasts, however, failed to find ratings success in spite of NBC's strength in entertainment programming in the late 1990s, as well as the hiring of several notable personalities in the market. WPTY-TV's news department was hastily assembled to make the deadline for their Fox-ABC switch, with multiple technical gaffes and on-air talent misidentifying area landmarks plaguing their debut. The weeknight anchor lineup changed within two weeks, and the news director was fired after a year. Low ratings continued to plague the station through a 2013 relaunch as WATN-TV under Nexstar ownership; the station was later sold to Tegna Inc. in 2019. New NBC affiliate WGBA-TV in Green Bay, Wisconsin, did not begin producing newscasts until July 1, 1996; it had doubled its payroll and expanded its studios in order to accommodate its news operation. Its newscasts lagged the other three local stations in the ratings, and turnover of on-air talent was high. WNWO-TV had a single daily newscast at 6 p.m. when it switched to NBC in September 1995; the following year, Malrite Communications purchased the station and began investing in the news department, but it failed to reap any windfall from NBC's highly rated prime time lineup. WNWO continued to experience ownership changes, poor ratings and staff turnover before newscast production was outsourced to WSBT-TV in 2017 and eliminated altogether in 2023.

WEVV-TV in Evansville, Indiana, which switched from Fox to CBS, shut down their news department in July 2001 amid poor ratings; after the station was sold to Bayou City Broadcasting, WEVV (which reclaimed the Fox affiliation on a digital subchannel in 2011) relaunched local newscasts. In South Bend, Indiana, replacement ABC affiliate WBND-LP did not offer local news until 2008, albeit produced by WDJT, and established a staffed newsroom in April 2011. Because of its competitive and technical weakness, Weigel tried to sell WBND-LP, WCWW-LP and WMYS-LP to WSBT-TV owner Schurz Communications in 2008, but the deal was abandoned in August 2009.

=== Effects in Mexico and Canada ===
Fox's acquisition of football rights brought the number of Fox affiliates broadcasting from Mexico from one to three. It also resulted in changes in Canadian cable regulations.

In San Diego, UPN affiliate KUSI-TV tried unsuccessfully to take the Fox affiliation away from Tijuana, Baja California, Mexico-licensed XETV, citing FCC regulations preventing any foreign station from airing live programming from the United States to U.S. audiences without an FCC-approved permit. Fox was eventually granted the permit allowing XETV to carry the games. XETV lost its affiliation to CW affiliate KSWB-TV in 2008 through a deal with Tribune Broadcasting; in turn, XETV assumed the CW affiliation. The permit to carry live programming also benefited two stations set up by Televisa with Fox programming: XHFOX-TV in Matamoros/Reynosa (serving the Harlingen–Brownsville–McAllen market) and XHFTX-TV in Nuevo Laredo (serving the Laredo market). However, these stations continued to have to "bicycle" tapes of programming across the border. These stations dropped their Fox affiliations on February 28, 2002, due to increased reverse compensation fees with Fox and high costs of local news production. Both stations became affiliates of Televisa's Canal de las Estrellas.

While the NFL signed Canadian rights agreements for both the NFC and AFC packages on television in Canada with the CanWest Global System and Western International Communications, the switches led to increased interest by Canadian cable companies in adding a U.S. Fox station to their lineups. However, since 1978, the availability of U.S. network affiliates on Canadian cable had been governed by the Canadian Radio-television and Telecommunications Commission (CRTC)'s "3 plus 1" rule, allowing the carriage of three American network affiliates plus a PBS station, with frequent exemptions for border towns where additional stations were receivable over-the-air. In June 1994, the CRTC stated it was unwilling to modify the rule; the next month, a group of 48 Canadian cable systems, many belonging to major operators, petitioned the CRTC to allow them to add Fox programming. Canadian broadcasters lobbied against any change, fearing that the addition of Fox would "Americanize the system further" and occupy channel capacity needed to provide new Canadian services. External pressure led the CRTC to reverse course by September, allowing Canadian cable providers to pick up a Fox affiliate without having to drop a "Big Three" affiliate.

=== Impact on Fox Kids ===
Fox Kids, which had been created as a joint venture between Fox and the affiliates in 1990, continued after the realignment with a roster of affiliates considerably different from the main Fox network. WBNX-TV and KSMO-TV saw their profiles boosted with the addition of Fox Kids: KSMO experienced dramatic viewership increases in the early afternoon, while WBNX became Cleveland's WB affiliate in 1997 owing to their success with Fox Kids. Facing increased competition from basic cable channels along with Kids' WB and UPN Kids, Fox Kids merged their in-house production arm with Saban Entertainment (who produced Mighty Morphin Power Rangers for the program block) to form Fox Kids Worldwide in 1996, purchased The Family Channel the following year and relaunched it as Fox Family Channel. By 1998, Fox Kids affiliates sold their ownership interests back to Fox in a deal where Fox affiliates would pay a combined $50 million per year for Fox's renewed NFC contract. Fox Family Channel struggled to find viewership and lost money, and Fox–Saban sold Fox Kids Worldwide to The Walt Disney Company in 2001. Fox Kids' operations were reassigned to the network proper and were ultimately replaced with a program block from 4Kids Entertainment in 2002.

=== The ascendance of Fox Sports ===
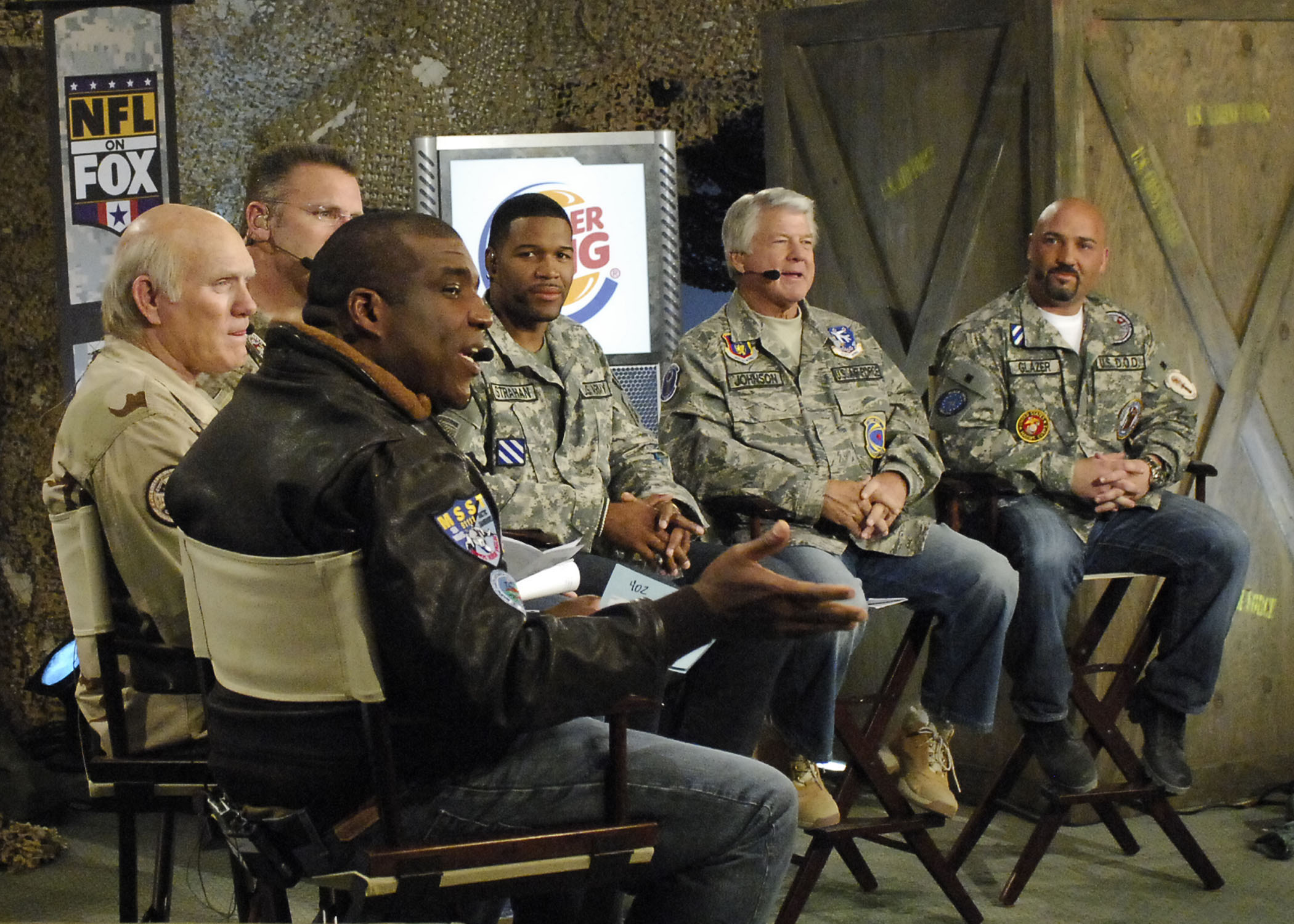
The Fox NFL Sunday hosts, 2009

Fox Sports has been cited as one of the fastest start-ups in modern television history, and the most successful. Aided by a number of off- and on-air personnel that defected from CBS Sports, David Hill—who was transferred as Sky Sports president to like duties for Fox—assembled the division in less than eight months. John Madden jokingly mused upon joining Fox Sports that the "s" should be removed from the name, "... because the only sport ... we had at Fox was football, NFL football". Adopting the slogan of "same game, new attitude", the NFL on Fox's centerpiece program was an hour-long pregame show, Fox NFL Sunday, incorporating comedy and entertainment with co-host Terry Bradshaw quickly becoming a breakout star. NFL Sunday's success demonstrated viewers held an appetite for football that extended beyond the game itself. Along with a theme song composed by Scott Schreer that has since become symbolic of the entire network, technical innovations included the "Fox Box" displaying the clock and score continuously (Hill perfected a similar on-screen bug for Sky's soccer coverage) and the use of parabolic microphones for in-game sound. NFL on Fox also provided a launching pad for other established announcers including Kenny Albert, Kevin Harlan and Joe Buck.

The affiliation switches helped elevate Fox to major network status, on par with its older, established competitors. The growth of Fox Sports was as quick as its founding: on September 9, 1994, Fox secured rights to the National Hockey League from 1995 to 1999, again outbidding CBS. Major League Baseball followed on November 7, 1995, initially via a shared arrangement with NBC. Fox Sports extended into regional sports networks beginning in 1996 through a joint venture with TCI's Liberty Media, creating Fox Sports Net from the former Prime Sports and SportsChannel networks. NASCAR coverage was added in 2001, including the Daytona 500, plus the Winston Cup and Busch Series. Along with the NFL, NASCAR on Fox and the MLB on Fox remain cornerstones of Fox Sports into the present day.

== See also ==
- 1989 South Florida television affiliation switch
- 1994 in American television
- 2006 United States broadcast television realignment
- 2001 Vancouver TV realignment
- 2007 Canadian broadcast television realignment
