= XHBR-TDT =

Television station in Nuevo Laredo

- Nuevo Laredo, Tamaulipas; Mexico
- Channels: Digital: 25 (UHF); Virtual: 4, 5
- Branding: Televisa Nuevo Laredo

Programming
- Subchannels: 4.1: Televisa Regional; 5.1: Canal 5

Ownership
- Owner: Grupo Televisa; (Televisora de Occidente, S.A. de C.V.)
- Sister stations: XHLAR-TDT

History
- Founded: October 1968
- Former call signs: XHBR-TV (1968–2015)
- Former channel numbers: Analog: 11 (VHF, 1968–2015)

Technical information
- Licensing authority: CRT
- ERP: 200 kW
- HAAT: 62.4 m (205 ft)
- Transmitter coordinates: 27°26′41.5″N 99°30′30.2″W

XHBR-TDT (channel 4 and 5) is a television station in Nuevo Laredo, Tamaulipas, Mexico. The station carries Televisa's local programming in Nuevo Laredo.

== History ==
XHBR received its concession on March 18, 1968 and came to air that October, broadcasting on analog channel 11. It was owned by Ramona Esparza González for 20 years until she transferred the station to Televisa subsidiary Televisión de Lerma, S.A., on July 19, 1988. Esparza González had bought XEFE-TV two years earlier. Televisa raised XHBR's effective radiated power from 3.5 to 325 kilowatts. In 2001, Televisión de Lerma was merged into Televimex, and in 2018 the concession was reassigned to Televisora de Occidente amid a major reorganization of concessions that saw them organized by service.

By the 2000s, XHBR was the local outlet of the Canal de las Estrellas network, a role now held by sister XHLAR-TDT. It was among the first stations in Mexico to broadcast in digital television.

== Subchannels ==
XHBR carries two subchannels:

Subchannels of XHBR-TDT
Channel	Res.	Short name	Programming
4.1	1080i	XHBR	Televisa Nuevo Laredo
5.1	480i	XHBR	Canal 5
