= XHLAR-TDT =

Television station in Nuevo Laredo

- Nuevo Laredo, Tamaulipas; Mexico
- Channels: Digital: 29 (UHF); Virtual: 2

Programming
- Affiliations: 2.1: Las Estrellas

Ownership
- Owner: Grupo Televisa; (Televimex, S.A. de C.V.)
- Sister stations: XHBR-TDT

History
- Founded: 9 March 1994
- First air date: 4 September 1994
- Former call signs: XHNUL-TV; XHFTX-TV (1994–2002)
- Former channel numbers: Analog: 57 (UHF, 1994–2015); Digital: 38 (UHF, 2013–2016); Virtual: 57 (2013–2018)
- Former affiliations: Fox (1994–2002); Televisa Regional (2002–2018)
- Call sign meaning: Laredo

Technical information
- Licensing authority: CRT
- ERP: 200 kW
- HAAT: 62.5 m (205 ft)
- Transmitter coordinates: 27°26′41.5″N 99°30′30.2″W

Links
- Website: Las Estrellas

XHLAR-TDT (channel 2) is a television station in Nuevo Laredo, Tamaulipas, Mexico. It is owned by Grupo Televisa and carries its Las Estrellas network. The station's studios and transmitter are located on Avenida de la República in Nuevo Laredo.

== History ==
Logo used as Televisa Nuevo Laredo

On 9 March 1994, Radiotelevisora de México Norte, S.A. de C.V., a subsidiary of Televisa, was authorized to build 62 new stations, including channel 57 in Nuevo Laredo, with the call sign XHNUL-TV. XHNUL and sister XHRTA-TV in Reynosa, however, did not sign on with Mexican programming.

Instead, channel 57 signed on for the first time on 4 September of that same year as XHFTX-TV, broadcasting programming from the Fox network for Laredo, Texas. Prior to XHFTX's sign-on, Laredo viewers received their Fox programs on cable, either from the national Foxnet service or from KRRT in San Antonio.

In 2002, XHFTX, along with XHFOX in Reynosa, disaffiliated from Fox, with the station changing its call sign to XHLAR-TV; Fox programming was reportedly replaced on cable with San Antonio's KABB. It would be about five years before Laredo would get another local Fox affiliate, KXOF-CA. XHLAR then became Televisa Nuevo Laredo, carrying local programming as well as re-airs of programs from the other Televisa networks, including series from Canal 5 and live sports from Gala TV.

In February 2013, XHLAR began broadcasting in digital on channel 38.1 (virtual 57.1); it upgraded its signal to 1080i HD in March 2014.

In 2018, the concessions of all Las Estrellas stations were consolidated in the concessionaire Televimex, S.A. de C.V., as part of a corporate reorganization of Televisa's concessionaires.

== Technical information ==
XHLAR broadcasts in 1080i HD on virtual channel 2.1. In December 2016, XHLAR was authorized to move from physical channel 38 to 29. It was allowed to begin utilizing virtual channel 2, putting the station in line with the rest of the network, in August 2018.

Subchannel of XHLAR-TDT
Channel	Res.	Short name	Programming
2.1	1080i	XHLAR	Las Estrellas
