= Cliff Holman =

American television personality (1929–2008)

- Born: James Clifton Holman Jr. June 29, 1929; Mobile, Alabama, U.S.
- Died: September 8, 2008 (aged 79); Albertville, Alabama, U.S.
- Other name: Cousin Cliff
- Education: Woodlawn High School
- Occupation: Television personality
- Spouse: Ann
- Children: 3

Cliff Holman (born James Clifton Holman Jr., June 29, 1929, in Mobile, Alabama – September 8, 2008, in Albertville, Alabama), best known as "Cousin Cliff," was a well-known television personality in the Birmingham, Alabama, market. As Cousin Cliff, he hosted a variety of children's shows, with the longest-running version shown daily on WABT, later WAPI.

== Early life ==
Holman was born in Mobile, but his family soon moved to Birmingham. He attended Woodlawn High School, and began performing the magic act that would eventually lead him to television.

Before entering television (and briefly while he was on TV as well), Holman worked in a creamery and ran his own grocery.

== "Cousin Cliff" and television ==
Holman began his television career in 1950 as a puppeteer for a short-run show (in a format known today as an infomercial) for the local Loveman's department store chain. After a stint in the United States Armed Forces during the Korean War, he returned to Birmingham and sought work in the entertainment business. His break came when a local bakery began a 15-minute children's show on WABT called Tip-Top Clubhouse. The show had its debut on March 15, 1954. The bakery withdrew its sponsorship after a couple of years, but the station kept the popular show and expanded it to 30 minutes, five days a week, renaming it Cliff's Clubhouse. The show eventually evolved into The Popeye Show, featuring a live studio audience and Popeye cartoons.

Holman performed magic tricks throughout the show, and his captain's hat and ribbon tie became his trademark. Holman was closely identified with the primary sponsors of his show, Pepsi-Cola and local fast food chain Jack's Hamburgers. The show was so popular that tickets for children to appear in the live studio audience were often booked months in advance.

In 1968, WAPI began taping the show instead of broadcasting it live, and moved the schedule to the following morning — largely missing its intended audience of children, who would be in school at that time of day. Holman was unhappy with the move and the resultant plunging viewership, and opted instead to take a position with new station WHMA in nearby Anniston, Alabama, in 1969. The Cousin Cliff Show ran there for three more years, sponsored by McDonald's, Jack's main competitor. The Sergeant Jack Show starring Neal Miller, an actual Jefferson County deputy sheriff (deputized primarily for the show's purposes) took over Holman's sponsorship, but aired on rival station WBMG.

Holman left television, working a number of positions in and out of media, until he revived his show on cable television in 1985. The show also had a short stint on independent station WDBB. In 1990 Holman renamed the program Cousin Cliff's Clubhouse and moved it to a Saturday timeslot on WBRC-TV. That show ran for two years, after which Holman again produced a cable version for Jack's Hamburgers. After a short run, Holman retired from television altogether.

Holman was also seen on various other variety shows in both Birmingham and Anniston over the years, and also worked behind the cameras. Holman was also an early on-air promoter of the Muscular Dystrophy Association. In the days before the now-defunct Jerry Lewis Labor Day Telethon became a nationwide tradition, "Cousin Cliff' encouraged children to hold backyard carnivals to raise money for MDA, and hosted his own carnival in the WAPI studio parking lot as well.

== After television ==
After leaving television, Holman performed his magic and comedy act in numerous venues. He also worked as a manager for the Parliament House hotel, and public relations manager for the local chapter of the American Lung Association, and an announcer for WCRT radio. He successfully ran for a seat on the Vestavia Hills city council in 1980, but declined to stand for re-election after becoming disenchanted with the position and politics.

His health took a turn for the worse after a fall following a performance in 2001. He was diagnosed with Alzheimer's disease in 2007 and moved to a hospice in Albertville, where he died in 2008. Holman's battle with Alzheimer's was highlighted in the 2009 HBO documentary The Alzheimer's Project. The funeral was held at Mountain Chapel United Methodist Church in Vestavia Hills. He was cremated in Birmingham's Elmwood Cemetery and Mausoleum's crematory with an urn interment within its cemetery afterwards.

Holman and his wife, Ann, had daughter Lynn Holman Brown, son Kyle Holman, and son James Clifton Holman III.
