= Coyote Calhoun =

Radio disc jockey from Alabama, US (born 1953)

Coyote Calhoun (born Jim Battan, May 22, 1953), also known as Coyote J, is a radio disc jockey. Calhoun is best known for his midnight show in the 1970s at WERC, a Top 40 station in Birmingham, Alabama. In the 1980s, Calhoun worked at Z-102 (WZBQ) and at I-95 (WAPI-FM). Calhoun was among the original air staff hired by WKDF, Nashville's progressive rock station, and The X (WRAX).

== History ==
=== Origins ===
In 1971, while in high school, Calhoun began working on-air as a jock for WKDA. He first worked for WKDA-AM, under a number of aliases. Calhoun then switched to the weekend and midnight shifts on WKDA-FM, working under his real name, Jim Battan. In 1973 moved to Pensacola to do the 7 to midnight shift on WBSR-AM, using the same alias there. In 1974 Battan moved to Birmingham to work late nights at WERC FM, progressive rock free form.

In 1975, Coyote J Calhoun was his new and permanent air name when hired by WERC AM Birmingham as a 7-12 night time screamer. The transfer to FM to AM and change to TOP 40 was triggered when the previous night time jock, Chris 'Superfoxx" quit over a contract dispute. The company moved him to WERC's AM and gave him the alias "Coyote J. Calhoun". During one of his shifts, Calhoun faked his own murder on air, which led to police and paramedics storming the building. As a result, Calhoun was given a five-day suspension.

In 1976, Calhoun wrestled a live black bear before a live audience at Boutwell Auditorium. The fight would end after he hit the bear over the head with a folding chair. When asked why he did it, Calhoun replied, "He started it."

In 1979, Calhoun resigned from his post at WERC and left for Los Angeles to do stand-up comedy. He moved to KPRI-FM in 1981, where he covered the 7 PM–12 PM shift. While in San Diego, Calhoun worked as a shock jock under famed consultant Reid Reeker.

After a brief stay in Denver, Calhoun returned from California with the intent to introduce new wave music to the southeast. Coyote accepted the specialty show gig at WAPI-FM Birmingham (95 Rock). In 1983, Coyote was transferred to WABB-FM Mobile, the sister station of I-95, where he did the afternoon shift. During this time, he began hosting a new music show for PD Leslie Fran (99X Atlanta). That same year, Calhoun won the Bobby Poe Air Personality of the Year award.

=== The Edge ===
In 1985, Calhoun landed the 7 PM–12 PM opening at WQUE-FM New Orleans. At Q-93, he debuted an expanded version of his post-punk program and began to use the name "The Edge". In New Orleans, Calhoun began incorporating dark wave, gothic and industrial music into his new music list. In late 1986, Q-93 changed their programming from contemporary to urban music, and Calhoun was fired.

Calhoun returned to Birmingham in the spring of 1987, again employed as a night-time 7-12 midnight screamer dj for WZBQ, Z-102. He also reintroduced his Sunday night show as The Edge to Tuscaloosa, Birmingham, and surrounding areas.

During a 1988 show Calhoun complained about station management and the songs he was required to play and then "stunted" with a classic rock format, airing songs by Boston, Mountain and Pink Floyd. This included a segment where station director Steve Russell called in to confront Calhoun and later came down to the studio and told him to cut his microphone, which ended in a scuffle and Calhoun's firing. In 2023 Jay admitted the entire event, though ad libbed, was a stunt that nevertheless resulted in members of the Tuscaloosa Police Department arriving at the station to investigate and escorting Calhoun out the door. This incident has over 1.3 million views on YOUTUBE. Management, unhappy with the resulting criticism and Calhoun's reputation for controversy, particularly his comments about sponsors, suggested he start a new show using the alias "Jock Mahoney", which lasted all of one show before Calhoun quit.

In 1989, Calhoun was hired by I-95 Birmingham, a competitor of Z-102. He would join their new morning team to replace the duo Mark and Brian, who had left for KLOS Los Angeles. The Morning Wake Up Service with Andy, Trey Matthews, and Coyote J. Calhoun debuted in the spring of 1989. Calhoun would bring his Sunday Edge show along with him. I-95 decided not to re-sign the trio in 1992.

That same year, The Edge went into syndication. From 1992 to 2002, The Edge aired on dozens of Alabama outlets: WVNA-Muscle Shoals, WQEN Gadsden, WTGZ Auburn, WHHY Montgomery, Z102.5 Tuscaloosa/Birmingham, I-95 and WRAX Birmingham, among others.

In 1995, Calhoun was hired as one of the original air talents to help launch the alternative music outlet The X (WRAX-FM) in Birmingham. Between 1998 and 2002, Calhoun wrote music reviews for The Birmingham Weekly. He stayed with The X until December 2006.

In January 2007, The Edge re-debuted in Birmingham on ROCK 99.5 in its usual Sunday night time slot. The show was retired in 2009. Calhoun returned to ROCK 99 to do a classic rock show in February 2009. After 15 years with Citadel Broadcasting, Calhoun would leave the company on February 14, 2010.

Today Calhoun hosts Coyote J's Sunday Night Cemetery of Rock Iheartradio/WJLX.

=== Work with Feeding Fingers ===
In 2010, Calhoun began collaborating with the German dark wave band Feeding Fingers and co-produced their third album, Detach Me From My Head, with songwriter Justin Curfmans. In April 2012, Feeding Fingers released a new single, "Inside the Body of an Animal", produced by Calhoun and Curfmans. Calhoun also co-produced three tracks on Feeding Fingers' fourth album, The Occupant, released in late February 2013. These were: "Inside the Body of an Animal", "I Drink Disappearing Ink", and "Paper Dolls Would Eat Glass for Us". "Polaroid Papercuts", an advance single from the upcoming Feeding Fingers triple album Attend, produced by Calhoun and Dana Culling, was released on March 16, 2015.

== Audios ==
=== From WZBQ ===
- Coyote J. WZBQ, Coyote J on WZBQ – 1
- Coyote J. WZBQ, Coyote J on WZBQ – 2
- COYOTE J THE EDGE

=== From WERC ===
- Coyote J. Calhoun WERC Air Check 1975 – Coyote Does The News
