= WGWW =

Television station in Anniston, Alabama

Satellite of WSES, Tuscaloosa, Alabama

- Anniston–Gadsden–; Birmingham, Alabama; United States
- City: Anniston, Alabama
- Channels: Digital: 9 (VHF); Virtual: 40
- Branding: WGWW Channel 40; ABC 33/40 (40.2)

Programming
- Affiliations: 40.1: Heroes & Icons; 40.2: ABC; 40.3: James Spann 24/7 Weather

Ownership
- Owner: Howard Stirk Holdings; (HSH Birmingham (WCFT) Licensee, LLC)
- Operator: Sinclair Broadcast Group
- Sister stations: WSES, WBMA-LD, WTTO, WABM

History
- First air date: October 26, 1969
- Former call signs: WHMA-TV (1969–1984); WJSU-TV (1984–2015)
- Former channel numbers: Analog: 40 (UHF, 1969–2009)
- Former affiliations: Primary: CBS (1969–1996); ABC, via WBMA-LD (1996–2014); Heartland (2014–2015); Secondary: NBC (1969–1970)

Technical information
- Licensing authority: FCC
- Facility ID: 56642
- ERP: 15.6 kW; 19.1 kW (application)
- HAAT: 359 m (1,178 ft); 396 m (1,299 ft) (application)
- Transmitter coordinates: 33°36′24″N 86°25′3″W

Links
- Public license information: Public file; LMS
- Website: www.howardstirkholdings.com/stations

WGWW (channel 40) is a television station licensed to Anniston, Alabama, United States, serving the eastern portion of the Birmingham market as an affiliate of the digital multicast network Heroes & Icons. The station is owned by Howard Stirk Holdings, a partner company of the Sinclair Broadcast Group. WGWW's transmitter is located at Bald Rock Mountain (off of Kelly Creek Road), near Moody in unincorporated southern St. Clair County.

WGWW operates as a full-time satellite of Tuscaloosa-licensed WSES (channel 33), whose advertising sales office is located on Golden Crest Drive in Birmingham. WGWW covers areas of northeastern Alabama that receive a marginal to non-existent over-the-air signal from WSES, although there is significant overlap between the two stations' contours otherwise, including in Birmingham proper. WGWW is a straight simulcast of WSES; on-air references to WGWW are limited to Federal Communications Commission (FCC)-mandated hourly station identifications during programming. Aside from the transmitter, WGWW does not maintain any physical presence locally in Anniston.

WGWW's second digital subchannel serves as a repeater of ABC affiliate WBMA-LD (channel 58, branded as ABC 33/40), of which WGWW had served as a full-time satellite station on its main feed from September 1996 to September 2014.

== History ==
=== Beginnings in Anniston ===
The station first signed on the air on October 26, 1969, as WHMA-TV. Originally operating as a primary CBS and secondary NBC affiliate, the station was initially owned by the Anniston Broadcasting Company, which was run by members of the family of Harry M. Ayers, who also owned the Anniston Star newspaper and local radio station WHMA (1390 AM and 100.5 FM, the FM station is now Atlanta-based WNNX-FM). It originally operated from studio facilities located on Noble Street in downtown Anniston.

Harry Mabry—who served as WHMA-TV's original general manager—came to Anniston from Birmingham, where he had served as news director at WBRC-TV (channel 6) for several years. Mabry already was familiar with Anniston, though, having worked as a staff announcer for WHMA-AM more than fifteen years prior to WHMA-TV's sign-on. Another former Birmingham personality who was part of the station's original staff was "Cousin Cliff" Holman, who left WAPI-TV (channel 13, now WVTM-TV) in 1969 after that station moved his cartoon showcase series, The Popeye Show, from weekday mornings to Saturday and Sunday mornings (due to declining ratings resulting from the show's move to a weekday morning slot and its switch from a mostly live broadcast to being pre-recorded the day before air several months beforehand) the previous year. Holman, who was also hired as its publicity director, resumed his program on WHMA-TV in the afternoons as The Cousin Cliff Show. However, the show was hampered by changes in the television industry and the Federal Communications Commission (FCC)'s decision in the early 1970s to prohibit children's hosts from promoting products directly on-air, forcing channel 40 to cancel the program by the summer of 1972. In later years, in addition to making public appearances at various children's gatherings (among other jobs), Holman would revive his program on a cable access channel in Birmingham in 1985, before moving to WBRC, which hired him to host the Saturday morning children's program Cousin Cliff's Clubhouse from 1990 to 1992.

WHMA-TV ultimately reached approximately 100,000 households across east-central Alabama, and management fought almost constantly to ensure that Arbitron maintained the distinction of Anniston as a separate television market from those encompassing the larger metropolitan areas of Birmingham and Atlanta. This was a maneuver that was critical to the station's survival; despite being the only television station located within the Anniston–Gadsden market (other than Alabama Public Television satellite station WCIQ (channel 7) in Mount Cheaha), WHMA faced immense competition from stations in the two larger nearby markets that provided "spill-in" (Grade B) signal coverage within eastern Alabama. The station's ratings victories in this part of the state garnered it access to numerous national advertisers, a rarity for a small-market television station of that time.

=== As an exclusive CBS affiliate ===
On May 31, 1970, when WAPI-TV formally removed CBS programming and became the exclusive NBC affiliate for the Birmingham market, WHMA-TV likewise dropped NBC programming and became a CBS affiliate full-time. It effectively became one of three central Alabama stations that were exclusively affiliated with CBS, accompanied by WBMG (channel 42, now WIAT) in Birmingham, which had been affiliated on a part-time basis with the network since it started in October 1965 (in a similar split arrangement with NBC) and WCFT-TV (channel 33) in Tuscaloosa, which joined CBS on the date that WBMG and WHMA became full-time affiliates of the network.

As was the case with WCFT, CBS opted to retain its affiliation with WHMA—despite the fact that Anniston is 35 miles (56 km) to the northeast of Birmingham—because, at the time, WBMG suffered from a weak broadcast signal that did not provide adequate coverage throughout most of the central third of Alabama. Even after WBMG increased its transmitter power to 1.2 million watts in 1969, channel 42 still had a very marginal to non-existent signal in much of east-central Alabama, which lies within the foothills of the Appalachian Mountains, which like other areas of rugged terrain, often experienced impaired over-the-air reception of UHF television stations. Many cable providers in the eastern part of the Birmingham market opted to carry channel 40 as the provider of CBS programming for that area of the state, instead of WBMG.

In 1984, the FCC—which protected the combination of WHMA-AM-FM-TV and the Anniston Star under a grandfather clause from forced divestiture, when the agency prohibited common ownership of newspapers and broadcast outlets in the same market in 1967—forced the Ayers family to break up its media empire. Later, in a 1985 deal that concerned avoidance of paying high tax rates more than profit, the Ayers sold the station to Jacksonville State University; the new owners changed the television station's call letters to WJSU-TV (for the university), but continued to operate it as a commercial station (unlike most TV/radio stations owned by colleges or universities, which operate as non-profit public broadcasters), retaining its CBS affiliation. In 1989, Jacksonville State University sold the station to the Osborne Communications Corporation.

=== As a satellite of WBMA-LP/-LD ===
On May 5, 1994, Great American Communications (which would be renamed Citicasters following the completion of its debt restructuring later that year) agreed to sell WBRC and three of its sister stations—fellow ABC affiliate WGHP in High Point, North Carolina, NBC affiliate WDAF-TV in Kansas City and CBS affiliate KSAZ-TV in Phoenix—to New World Communications for $350 million in cash and $10 million in share warrants. As part of a broader deal between New World and the Fox Broadcasting Company signed on May 23 of that year, New World agreed to affiliate five of its eight existing television stations and the four it had acquired from Great American with Fox, in a series of affiliation transactions that would take two years to complete due to the varying conclusion dates of their ongoing contracts with either ABC, NBC or CBS. Three weeks later, New World agreed to buy WVTM-TV and three other stations—CBS affiliates KDFW in Dallas–Fort Worth and KTBC in Austin, and ABC affiliate KTVI in St. Louis—from Argyle Television Holdings, in a purchase option-structured deal worth $717 million. Due to conflicts with FCC ownership rules of the time period, New World subsequently decided to establish and transfer the licenses of WBRC and WGHP into a trust company, with the intent to sell them to the Fox network's broadcasting subsidiary, Fox Television Stations (in the case of Birmingham, New World could not keep WBRC and WVTM since the FCC then forbade a single company from owning two television stations in the same market; the concurrent Argyle and Citicasters acquisitions also put New World three stations over the FCC's twelve-station ownership limit).

Although the sales of WBRC and WGHP were finalized on July 24, 1995, Fox Television Stations could not switch WBRC's network affiliation in the short term, as the station's contract with ABC would not expire until August 31, 1996. While this forced Fox to operate WBRC as an ABC affiliate for thirteen months after the sale's closure, it gave the latter network enough time to find a new central Alabama affiliate. ABC first approached WTTO (channel 21)—which, along with semi-satellites WDBB (channel 17) in Tuscaloosa and WNAL-TV (channel 44, now WPXH-TV) in Gadsden, was set to lose its Fox affiliation to channel 6—for a deal to replace WBRC as its Birmingham outlet. However, the owner of WTTO, Sinclair Broadcast Group, only expressed interest in carrying ABC's prime time and news programming. It also refused to launch a news department for WTTO, as the group did not factor local news production into its corporate budget at the time (this was despite the fact that sister station WDBB had maintained a standalone news operation at the time ABC started negotiations with WTTO, which was eventually shut down when the former switched to a full-time WTTO simulcast in December 1995).

In November 1995, Allbritton Communications purchased WCFT-TV from Federal Broadcasting for $20 million; it concurrently signed a deal with Fant Broadcasting to assume operational responsibilities for WNAL-TV under a local marketing agreement (LMA). Then in January 1996, after it terminated the WNAL deal, Allbritton acquired the non-license assets of WJSU-TV from Osborne Communications Corporation for $12 million (through an LMA arrangement which included an option to eventually purchase the station outright). Allbritton wanted to relocate WJSU's transmitter facilities closer to Birmingham to provide a stronger signal within that metropolitan area and nearby Tuscaloosa; however, the relocation was prohibited under FCC regulations that required a station's transmitter site be located no more than 15 miles (24 km) from its city of license (Anniston is 63 miles (101 km) north-of-due-east of Birmingham), which would have required an application to change the city of license closer to Birmingham in order to legally allow the move.

Shortly after the WJSU purchase took place, ABC reached a unique deal with Allbritton, in which WCFT and WJSU would become the new ABC affiliates for Central Alabama, with WCFT acting as the main station. ABC had a very strong relationship with Allbritton, particularly as Allbritton's flagship station, WJLA-TV in Washington, D.C., had long been one of ABC's highest-rated affiliates. In April 1996, a few months after the Birmingham deal was struck, Allbritton's ties to ABC were sealed wholesale when Allbritton reached a ten-year affiliation agreement with ABC that renewed contracts with the group's four existing ABC affiliates (WJLA-TV, KATV in Little Rock, Arkansas, KTUL in Tulsa, Oklahoma, and WHTM in Harrisburg, Pennsylvania, the latter of which was being acquired by Allbritton at the time) and resulted in two of its other stations switching to the network (NBC affiliate WCIV [now Heroes & Icons affiliate WGWG] in Charleston, South Carolina and WB affiliate WBSG-TV [now Ion Television owned-and-operated station WPXC-TV] in Brunswick, Georgia), the latter of which would become a satellite of WJXX in nearby Jacksonville, Florida, when Allbritton signed that station on in February 1997.

However under Nielsen rules, neither WCFT nor WJSU would have likely been counted in the Birmingham ratings books as it had designated Tuscaloosa and Anniston as separate markets at the time. Allbritton's solution to this issue was to purchase W58CK, a low-power independent station in Birmingham that began operations on November 18, 1994, which would serve as the primary station for the purpose of being counted in local ratings diaries (the three stations would later be collectively rated as "WBMA+"). While the purchase of channel 58 was not a condition of the deal between ABC and Allbritton, it did pave the way for Anniston and Tuscaloosa to be consolidated back into the Birmingham television market in September 1998 (at the start of the 1998–99 television season). That move benefited all of the major Birmingham stations, as it not only increased their viewership in Tuscaloosa and Anniston, but also resulted in Birmingham's placement in Nielsen's national market rankings jumping twelve spots from 51st to 39th place.

On September 1, 1996, when W58CK became an ABC affiliate, WJSU and WCFT concurrently ended separate operations as well and became full-powered satellite stations of W58CK, with Allbritton assuming control of WJSU's operations under the originally proposed LMA, which was transferred to Flagship Broadcasting upon that company's purchase of that station. The station's studio facilities on Noble Street in downtown Anniston was converted into the Anniston news bureau for W58CK's news department; WJSU's master control operations were migrated into W58CK's new studios on Concourse Parkway in Hoover. WCFT and WJSU also ceded the CBS programming rights in central Alabama to WBMG, which had recently upgraded its transmitter to provide a much stronger full-power signal throughout much of the Birmingham market, and WNAL-TV, which took over as CBS's northeastern Alabama affiliate on the day of the WBRC/WBMA+/WTTO switch.

Even though WBMA was the official ABC affiliate for the Birmingham market, Allbritton chose instead to name the triumvirate operation "ABC 33/40", using the over-the-air channel numbers of WCFT and WJSU instead as the collective branding for the stations, making it appear as if WCFT was the primary station and WJSU was acting as its satellite. In the case of WJSU, its signal footprint covered the western portions of the Birmingham metropolitan area and outlying rural areas of eastern Jefferson County, stretching eastward to the Alabama–Georgia state line; the station's broadcast signal provided a contour of at least Grade B coverage within Birmingham's eastern inner ring. Cable (and eventually, satellite) providers within northeastern Alabama received WBMA's programming through WJSU. Allbritton Communications purchased WJSU-TV outright in 2008.

=== Acquisition by Sinclair ===
For over a decade and a half, WBMA+ maintained a strong relationship with Allbritton, with no major problems arising between the two entities and, likewise, no major changes occurring to the station's operations. On July 29, 2013, Allbritton announced that it would sell its seven television stations, including WBMA+, to the Sinclair Broadcast Group (which would purchase the stations for $985 million), in an attempt by the company to shift its focus toward co-owned political news website, Politico. As part of the deal, Sinclair had intended to sell the license assets of its existing Birmingham stations, CW affiliate WTTO and MyNetworkTV affiliate WABM (channel 68) to Deerfield Media, and retain operational responsibilities for those stations through shared services and joint sales agreements. At the time, no affiliation changes were expected.

On December 6, 2013, the FCC informed Sinclair that applications related to the deal need to be "amended or withdrawn", as Sinclair would retain an existing time brokerage agreement between WTTO and its satellite station, WDBB (channel 17); this would, in effect, create a new LMA between WBMA+ and WDBB, even though the commission had ruled in 1999 that such agreements made after November 5, 1996, covering the programming of more than 15% of a station's broadcast day would count toward the ownership limits for the brokering station's owner. A sale of WBMA and its satellites to a separate buyer was also not an option for Sinclair, as Allbritton wanted its stations to be sold together to limit the tax rate that the company would have had to pay from the accrued proceeds, which it estimated would have been substantially higher if the group was sold piecemeal.

On March 20, 2014, as part of a restructuring of the Sinclair-Allbritton deal in order to address these ownership conflicts as well as to expedite the Allbritton acquisition because of them due to the FCC's increased scrutiny of outsourcing agreements used to circumvent in-market ownership caps, Sinclair announced that it would retain ownership of WTTO (choosing to retain the LMA between that station and WDBB, and continue operating it as a satellite station of WTTO), and form a new duopoly between it and WBMA+; WABM was to be sold to a third-party buyer with which Sinclair would not enter into an operational outsourcing arrangement or maintain any contingent interest, other than a possible transitional shared facilities agreement until WTTO was able to move its operations from its longtime home on Beacon Parkway West to WBMA's facility in Hoover.

On May 29, 2014, however, Sinclair informed the FCC that it had not found a buyer for WABM (even among the market's three existing major station owners, WBRC owner Raycom Media, then-WVTM owner Media General and then-WIAT owner LIN Media, neither of which operated an existing duopoly station in the Birmingham market, although the latter two groups were in the process of merging at the time) and proposed surrendering the licenses of WCFT and WJSU to the agency. Under the restructured plan, WBMA's programming would be added to WABM's main channel, which would result in the latter's syndicated and MyNetworkTV programming moving to its second digital channel on 68.2 (WBMA-LD itself, as a low-power station, would not be affected as FCC rules allow the ownership of low-power and full-power stations regardless of market ownership caps for duopolies). Sinclair opted to retain WABM on the basis that its transmission facilities were superior to those of WCFT and WJSU; indeed, moving ABC programming to WABM would give ABC a full-power affiliate in Birmingham itself for the first time since 1996. After nearly a year of delays, Sinclair's deal to acquire Allbritton was approved by the FCC on July 24, 2014, and was completed on August 1, 2014.

=== Sale to Howard Stirk Holdings ===
On September 18, 2014, in preparation for the planned shutdown of WJSU and WCFT eleven days later on September 29, WDBB and WABM both added simulcast feeds of WBMA-LD on their respective second digital subchannels (17.2 and 68.2).

Ten days later on September 28, Sinclair filed an application with the FCC to sell the license assets of WJSU-TV to Howard Stirk Holdings (a group owned by conservative political commentator Armstrong Williams, who has ties to Sinclair as his political affairs program, The Armstrong Williams Show, airs on many of the group's stations and is produced at the studios of its Washington flagship station WJLA-TV). Howard Stirk Holdings had reached a similar deal to acquire WCFT-TV for the purchase amount four days earlier on September 24. As part of the deal, Sinclair agreed to forego any agreements with HSH to operate the station. HSH was involved in another transaction involving Sinclair to absolve the LMA issues in markets where the Allbritton deal conflicted with one of Sinclair's existing grandfathered LMAs occurred on September 19, involving (the original) WCIV in Charleston, which – similar to the proposal for WCFT and WJSU – was also set to be shut down as a result of a similar arrangement involving its MyNetworkTV affiliate in that market, WMMP (which would assume the WCIV calls upon taking over the ABC affiliation), due to a grandfathered LMA that station maintained and subsequently decided to terminate with Fox affiliate WTAT. WJSU-TV stopped carrying WBMA-LD's programming on September 29, 2014, at 10:35 p.m.

On September 28, 2014, Sinclair reached a deal to sell the license assets of WJSU-TV to Howard Stirk Holdings for $50,000, foregoing any operational agreements with the station's new owner. Sinclair had earlier reached identical deals to sell the licenses of WCFT-TV and the original WCIV in Charleston, South Carolina (since renamed WMMP and now WGWG), two other former Allbritton stations whose licenses were previously slated to be surrendered, to the same company.

As the sale of WJSU-TV to HSH in effect superseded the proposed surrender of its license, Sinclair requested that the FCC place a hold on canceling the licenses until at least ten business days after acting on the proposed transaction. In order for Sinclair to continue operating WJSU and WCFT and maintain their existing licenses until the FCC ruled on the petition and the sale to HSH, the two stations began providing interim programming as affiliates of Heartland (which both stations had been carrying on their third digital subchannels as WBMA satellites since the network launched as The Nashville Network on November 1, 2012) on October 20, 2014; although neither technically operated as WBMA satellites any longer (even though all three maintained affiliations with Heartland), master control for the two stations continued to originate from the Hoover studios of WBMA+, which continued to handle the sale of local advertising. At that time, WJSU essentially converted into a satellite of WCFT. The FCC approved the transfer of license of WJSU-TV and WCFT-TV to Howard Stirk Holdings on December 4, 2014.

On December 3, 2014, WJSU-TV restored programming from WBMA-LD on its signal, under a subchannel leasing agreement with Sinclair; ABC network, local and syndicated programming seen on WBMA's main channel (and previously seen on the main channel of WJSU) was added on the station's 40.2 subchannel, while the "James Spann 24/7 Weather" subchannel was added on digital subchannel 40.3, in an altered channel mapping from that arranged by WBMA-LD's digital signal at the time (in which WBMA carried "James Spann 24/7 Weather" on its second subchannel and Heartland on its third subchannel, both succeeding the station's main programming feed). The license transfer of WJSU and WCFT to HSH Birmingham was approved by the FCC the following day on December 4. On March 11, 2015, Howard Stirk Holdings was granted its application to change the call letters of WJSU to WGWW. concurrently, WCFT became WSES; On October 1, 2015, the station switched its primary affiliation from Heartland to Heroes & Icons.

Even though WGWW is the only one of the two original satellites that continues to relay WBMA's programming, the station continues to identify by "ABC 33/40" as an artifact brand as most central Alabamians still refer to WBMA+ by either that name or "channel 33/40", as well as the fact that the station is carried on either channel on AT&T U-verse, DirecTV and Dish Network in the market. With WDBB, WABM and WGWW relegating the station's ABC programming to digital subchannels, WBMA-LD became the largest Big Four network affiliate by market size to rely on digital multicasting for full market distribution over-the-air (in addition to its existing status as the largest low-power Big Four affiliate overall), as well as making Birmingham one of the only U.S. television markets where all but one of the six major broadcast networks (in this case, CBS, NBC, Fox, The CW and MyNetworkTV) maintain primary channel affiliations on full-power stations, while the remaining network (ABC) is only available through low-power and digital multicast affiliations.

== Newscasts ==
As WHMA-TV, WGWW established a news department when it signed on in October 1969, with the debut of TV-40 News, consisting of half-hour newscasts that aired at 6 and 10 p.m. each weeknight. By the mid-1980s, newscasts were added on weekend evenings; morning and 5 p.m. newscasts debuted on the station during the early 1990s. In sharp contrast to WBMG, WHMA/WJSU's newscasts gained traction against two of the three established television news competitors from the nearby Birmingham market that existed prior to 1996 that transmitted their signals into the Anniston–Gadsden market; its newscasts were typically strong performers in the ratings in east-central Alabama for most of the 27-year run of its in-house news department, ranking ahead of WVTM and competing heavily with the Birmingham market's perennial first-place finisher, WBRC.

As a result of the entrance of the local marketing agreement with Allbritton Communications and the group's decision to convert the station into a full-power satellite to WCFT-TV (before subsequently turning it to one of upstart W58CK) upon its assumption of the ABC affiliation, Allbritton announced in the spring of 1996 that it would shut down WJSU's Anniston-based news department, and convert its Noble Street studios into a news bureau for W58CK's newly established news operation, retaining a small staff of reporters and photographers to produce story content focused on east-central Alabama that would be included within the latter's newscasts. Channel 40's news department ceased operations and aired its final in-house newscasts on August 31, 1996. W58CK launched its in-house news department the following day on September 1, when the station was merged into the "ABC 33/40" trimulcast; WJSU's locally based newscasts were replaced by simulcasts of W58CK/WBMA's morning, midday and evening newscasts. Allbritton transferred certain members of WJSU's news staff to the W58CK/WBMA news department.

=== Notable former on-air staff ===
- Catherine Callaway – reporter
- Cliff Holman ("Cousin Cliff") – children's program host (1969–1972)
- Harry Mabry – general manager and news director/anchor

== Technical information ==
=== Subchannels ===
The station's signal is multiplexed:

Subchannels of WGWW
Subchannel	Res.	Short name	Programming
40.1	480i	H&I	Heroes & Icons
40.2	720p	ABC3340	ABC (WBMA-LD)
40.3	480i	WX	James Spann 24/7 Weather (WBMA-LD) (4:3)

Simulcast of subchannels of another station

=== Analog-to-digital conversion ===
WGWW (as WJSU-TV) shut down its analog signal over UHF channel 40 on June 12, 2009, the official date on which full-power television stations in the United States transitioned from analog to digital broadcasts under federal mandate. The station's digital signal remained on its pre-transition VHF channel 9, using virtual channel 40.
