= WDXB =

Country music radio station in Pelham–Birmingham, Alabama

Coordinates: 33.444°N 86.880°W

- Pelham, Alabama; United States
- Broadcast area: Birmingham metropolitan area
- Frequency: 102.5 MHz (HD Radio)
- Branding: 102.5 The Bull

Programming
- Format: Country
- Subchannels: HD2: Black Information Network
- Affiliations: Premiere Networks; WBRC (weather)

Ownership
- Owner: iHeartMedia; (iHM Licenses, LLC)
- Sister stations: WERC, WERC-FM, WMJJ, WQEN

History
- First air date: March 28, 1962
- Former call signs: WWWB-FM (1962–1986); WZBQ (1986–1987); WZBQ-FM (1987–1994); WOWC (1994–1999)
- Call sign meaning: "Dixie Birmingham"

Technical information
- Licensing authority: FCC
- Facility ID: 2114
- Class: C1
- ERP: 90,000 watts
- HAAT: 313 meters (1,027 ft)
- Translator: HD2: 92.7 W224CK (Vestavia Hills)

Links
- Public license information: Public file; LMS
- Webcast: Listen live (via iHeartRadio); Listen live (HD2)
- Website: 1025thebull.iheart.com HD2: birmingham.binnews.com

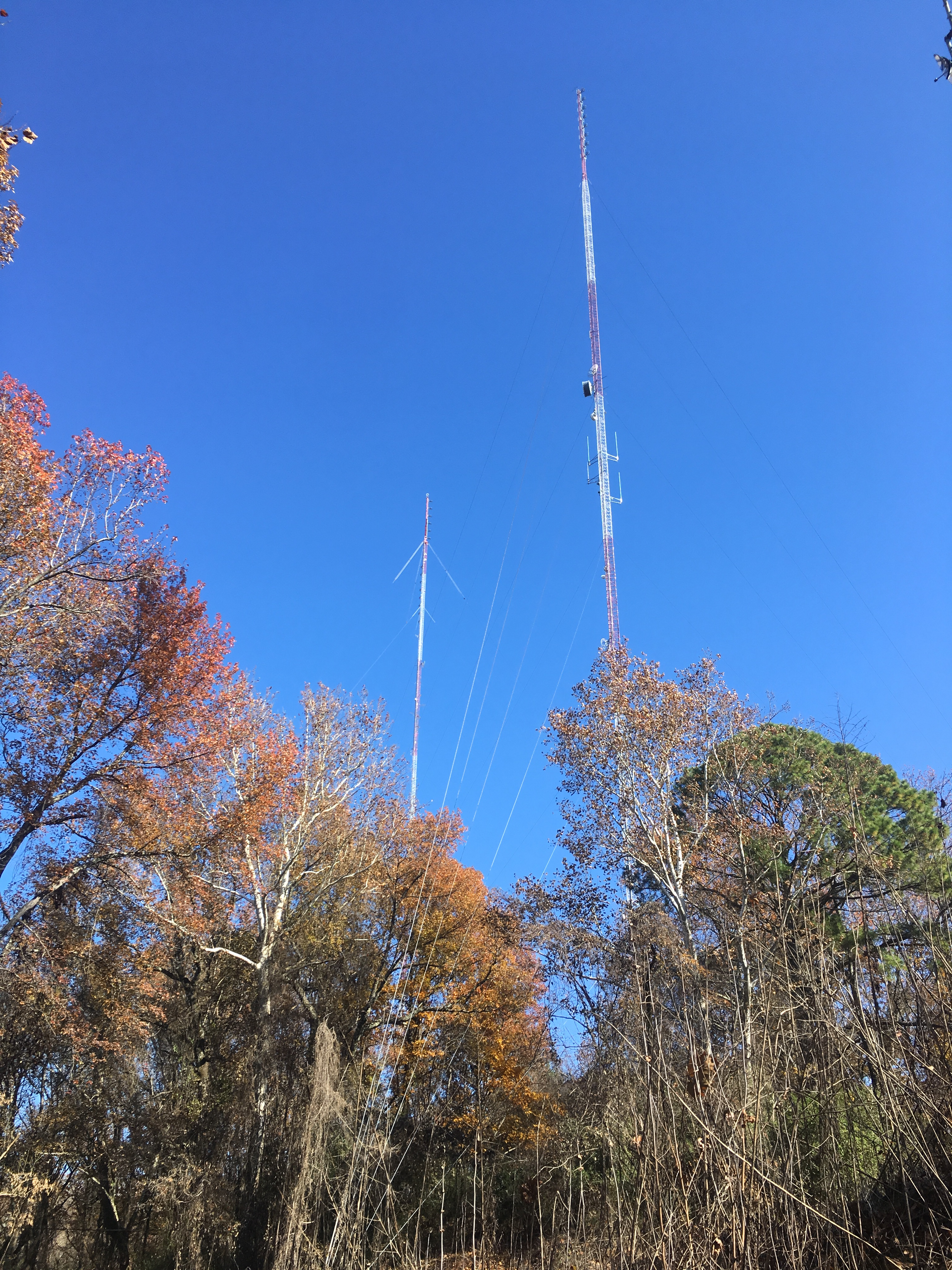
Transmitter towers, including one for WDXB, November 2019

WDXB (102.5 FM) is a country music formatted radio station licensed to Pelham, Alabama, and serving the Birmingham metropolitan area and north-central Alabama. The radio studios and offices are on First Avenue South in Birmingham near Interstate 65. The station calls itself "102.5 The Bull" and is owned by San Antonio–based iHeartMedia.

WDXB has an effective radiated power (ERP) of 90,000 watts. The transmitter is in Red Mountain Park in Southwest Birmingham, off Venice Road. WDXB broadcasts using HD Radio technology. The HD-2 digital subchannel carries iHeart's Black Information Network which is fed by 225 watt FM translator W224CK at 92.7 MHz in Vestavia Hills.

== Programming ==
Weekdays: Granger Smith is on from 12-5am. The Spencer Graves Show with Megan Terry is on 5-10am. Billy Greenwood is from 10am-2pm. Dino is from 2-4pm. Madison is from 4-7pm The Bobby Bones Show is on from 7pm-12am.

== History ==
=== WWWB-FM ===
On March 28, 1962, the station signed on as WWWB-FM. It was the FM counterpart to WWWB AM 1360 (now WIXI), owned by Bankhead Broadcasting. It was powered at 27,000 watts, a fraction of its current output.

WWWB-FM was a small-market radio station that was licensed to Jasper, located 40 miles northwest of Birmingham. The station's signal covered mainly rural northwest Alabama, and it played country music. In 1986, WDBB-TV in Tuscaloosa erected a new transmission tower near the border of Jefferson County and Tuscaloosa County to enable its signal to cover the Birmingham TV market. WWWB-FM's owners saw it as an opportunity for their FM station.

=== WZBQ and WOWC ===
WWWB-FM began broadcasting off the new WDBB tower and dropped country music for Top 40. The call sign was changed to WZBQ and the station was known on the air as "Z-102".

While Z-102 was successful in the smaller Tuscaloosa market, it did not make a big impact in Birmingham. Birmingham had two other Top 40 stations at the time (WAPI-FM and WKXX) and Gadsden's WQEN covered most of the market as well. WZBQ continued with its Top 40 format throughout the rest of the 1980s and into the early 1990s. In early 1994, the format was changed to oldies, and the station was renamed Cool 102.5.

In August 1994, new owners dropped the oldies format in favor of country and changed the call letters to WOWC. The station was known on the air as Wow Country 102 and began broadcasting from studios in Birmingham. "Wow Country" was the first direct challenge presented to the Birmingham market's top-rated station, WZZK, in nearly eight years. However, due to signal limitations presented from broadcasting from a tower 30 miles west of Birmingham, WOWC initially enjoyed only marginal success.

=== WDXB ===
In 1999, the call letters of the station were changed to WDXB and the station was renamed Dixie 102.5, as more classic country songs were added to the playlist. Two factors enabled WDXB to become a serious competitor to WZZK. First, the station began broadcasting from a tower more centrally located to Birmingham in 2002, enabling its signal to cover the entire market. Then in 2003, the station hired the popular morning-drive team of Patti Wheeler and "Dollar" Bill Lawson, who had been forced out at WZZK earlier that year.

In 2005, 102-5 the Bull, as WDXB was known by then, finally passed WZZK in the local Arbitron ratings. Today, the two stations enjoy a heated rivalry and trade positions in the ratings.

In 2008, WDXB changed its city of license from Jasper to Pelham, Alabama.

=== Coyote J. Calhoun's suspension ===
One evening in 1988, popular disc-jockey Coyote J. Calhoun (or simply known as Coyote J) who formerly worked at other stations across a few states including Alabama was fired after stunting an hour of classic rock songs and current albums. This short stunt includes mostly songs by Boston, including a few songs by Pink Floyd and others. After ranting on the songs Z-102 normally plays, he commented on other songs he was planning to play such as songs by Led Zeppelin and began talking about locking himself in the studio.

Steve Russell (Z-102's program director) came into the studio. He told Coyote to shut the mic off multiple times. Coyote refused to turn off the microphone. Steve then tackles Coyote, making a loud ruckus at the studio. Coyote then yells at Steve to let himself go. Another employee named Shadow then tried to help Steve. Coyote tries to request Steve to play a song by The Supremes, but Steve continues to yell at Coyote to ask the same comment "Shut the mic off now". While continuing on-air, Steve can be heard tackling Coyote to the ground. While continuing the argument, Steve and Coyote battled over the mic, flickering on-and-off and on again. As the battle still continues, Steve then replied "You're gone", meaning that Steve fired Coyote for refusing to turn off the microphone. The fight comes to an end once the mic is abruptly shut off, but not before Coyote audibly calls out "you son of a..." on-air.

Because of the ruckus, police officers from the Tuscaloosa Police Department responded to the call after hearing them rattling the studio, and Coyote was escorted out of the building. He returned to Z-102 the following year but quit a short time later for nearby Birmingham's WAPI-FM (I-95).

== HD Radio ==
=== WDXB-HD2 ===
WDXB airs the Black Information Network on its HD2 subchannel.

=== WDXB-HD3 ===
On February 16, 2024, WDXB began airing WJLX's oldies format on its HD3 subchannel. WJLX's 1240 AM signal in Jasper was off the air due to the theft of its tower, the WJLX 1240 AM broadcast signal was restored in February 2025. The HD3 subchannel remains on the air.

== Translator ==
Broadcast translator for WDXB-HD3
Call sign	Frequency	City of license	FID	ERP (W)	Class	FCC info
W268BM	101.5 FM	Jasper, Alabama	150814	250	D	LMS
