= Mai Martinez =

American television news anchor and reporter

- Born: December 16, 1973 (age 51); San Francisco, California
- Education: Jacksonville State University
- Occupation(s): News Anchor, Reporter
- Years active: 2003-present
- Employer(s): WOXR K-98; WDSI-TV; WBRC-TV; WBBM-TV; WBBM (AM) (April 4 2022-present)

Mai Martinez (born December 16, 1973) is an American news anchor and reporter. She is the co-anchor of the morning news on WBBM (AM) Newsradio 780 AM and 105.9 FM, with Cisco Cotto. She is a reporter for the all-news radio station.

== Early life and education ==
A native of San Francisco, Martinez earned a bachelor's degree in 1997 from Jacksonville State University in Jacksonville, Alabama. She is of half Cuban and half Vietnamese descent.

== Professional career ==
Martinez began her broadcasting career as a video editor at WBRC-TV in Birmingham, Alabama, where she worked from 1997 until 2003. In 2000, she co-hosted a morning radio show on WOXR-FM in Oxford, Alabama. In 2003, Martinez became a photographer, general assignment reporter and fill-in anchor at WDSI-TV in Chattanooga, Tennessee. She then rejoined WBRC-TV in April 2004 as a general assignment reporter and fill-in anchor. While there, Martinez developed a higher level of national visibility when she spent eight weeks in Aruba covering the disappearance of Natalee Holloway. In May 2006, Martinez was hired by WBBM-TV in Chicago as a general assignment reporter. On September 20, 2007, she was promoted to be a weekend news anchor at the station. Martinez was laid off on May 27, 2020. On March 28, 2022, WBBM (AM) announced that Martinez has been hired to co-anchor the morning news starting April 4, 2022, with Cisco Cotto from 6-9 AM, she will also report stories from the field for WBBM Newsradio.

== Personal ==
She is single and lives in the Uptown neighborhood on Chicago's North Side.
