= WGIB =

Radio station in Birmingham, Alabama

WGIB and WQEM

WGIB: Birmingham, Alabama; WQEM: Columbiana, Alabama; United States
- Frequencies: WGIB: 91.9 MHz; WQEM: 101.5 MHz

Programming
- Format: Christian radio
- Affiliations: SRN News

Ownership
- Owner: Glen Iris Baptist School

History
- First air date: WGIB: 1983; WQEM: 1999
- Call sign meaning: WGIB: Glen Iris Baptist; WQEM: Variation of former sister station WQEN

Technical information
- Licensing authority: FCC
- Facility ID: WGIB: 24256; WQEM: 41641
- Class: WGIB: C3; WQEM: A
- ERP: WGIB: 3,500 watts; WQEM: 1,800 watts
- HAAT: WGIB: 266 meters (873 ft); WQEM: 185 meters (607 ft)
- Transmitter coordinates: WGIB: 33°24′59″N 86°36′28″W; WQEM: 33°13′46″N 86°42′56″W

Links
- Public license information: WGIB: Public file; LMS; WQEM: Public file; LMS
- Webcast: Listen live; Listen live
- Website: www.gleniris.net/wgib

WGIB (91.9 FM) and WQEM (101.5 FM) are non-commercial, listener-supported radio stations based in Birmingham, Alabama. WGIB is licensed to Birmingham while WQEM is licensed to Columbiana. They are owned by the Glen Iris Baptist School and they simulcast a Christian talk and teaching format. The studios are on 10th Place South, near Interstate 65 in Birmingham. Programming is relayed on a series of low-powered FM translators around Alabama. The audio is also streamed on the internet and accompanied by nature scenes on a subchannel of Glen Iris Baptist's low power television station W16DS-D.

National religious leaders heard on WGIB and WQEM include David Jeremiah, Jim Daly, Adrian Rogers, Alistair Begg, Chuck Swindoll, Nancy DeMoss Wolgemuth, J. Vernon McGee, John MacArthur and Charles Stanley. Some hours are devoted to Christian music. SRN News supplies updates during the day. The station holds periodic on-air fundraisers and seeks donations on its website.

== History ==
The WGIB call letters were assigned by the Federal Communications Commission on September 20, 1982.

WQEM serves an area about 25 miles (40 km) south of Birmingham. It was purchased from Clear Channel Communications in 2002. Glen Iris kept the WQEM call sign for the station after its purchase. The station was assigned the WQEM call letters by the Federal Communications Commission on August 3, 1998. Before its purchase by Glen Iris Baptist School, WQEM served as a repeater of Top 40 station WQEN, whose signal at the time did not adequately cover the southern suburbs of Birmingham.

== Translators ==
Call sign	Frequency	City of license	FID	ERP (W)	Class	FCC info
W222AZ	92.3 FM	Springville, Alabama	141688	10	D	LMS
W291BT	106.1 FM	Jasper, Alabama	140355	55	D	LMS
W291CG	106.1 FM	Odenville, Alabama	141676	10	D	LMS
W300AE	107.9 FM	Tuscaloosa, Alabama	24258	250	D	LMS
