= Catherine Callaway =

American news anchor

Catherine Callaway is a former news anchor for CNN and Headline News, where she worked from 1993 until 2014. She was born in Atlanta, and is a graduate of Jacksonville State University in Jacksonville, Alabama.

== Career ==
Callaway's background includes work at WJSU-TV (now WGWW) in Anniston, Alabama, WAFF-TV in Huntsville, Alabama and WBMG-TV (now WIAT) in Birmingham, Alabama.

In 1993, she joined CNN as an anchor, first anchoring a weekend overnight newscast. In 1994, she anchored a weeknight newscast that was aimed for a primetime audience on the West Coast.

During her 21-year career with Turner Broadcasting, she anchored various newscasts for CNN, Headline News, CNN International and CNN.com. She also co-anchored "Accent Health" with Dr. Sanjay Gupta. She interviewed several major figures including former President Jimmy Carter, former Vice President Al Gore, Mexican President Vicente Fox, U.S. Senator Sam Nunn, and MLB Hall of Famer Phil Niekro. In 2002, she was on the overnight anchor desk during CNN's live coverage of the arrests of the suspects in the Washington, D.C. sniper attacks. In August 2005, she was the overnight anchor during CNN's award-winning coverage of Hurricane Katrina. She worked as a field reporter for CNN and CNN Newsource, covering major events for the networks and affiliates including hurricanes, space shuttle launches, the funeral of legendary singer James Brown, and the police shooting of Michael Brown and following riots in Ferguson, Missouri.

She retired from the company in 2014.
