= WERC (AM) =

Simulcast of WERC-FM, Hoover, AL
- Birmingham, Alabama; United States
- Broadcast area: Greater Birmingham
- Frequency: 960 kHz
- Branding: News Radio 105.5 WERC

Programming
- Format: Talk radio
- Affiliations: Fox News Radio; Premiere Networks; Compass Media Networks; WBRC

Ownership
- Owner: iHeartMedia, Inc.; (iHM Licenses, LLC)
- Sister stations: WDXB, WERC-FM, WMJJ, WQEN

History
- First air date: May 25, 1925
- Former call signs: WBRC (1925–1972); WERC (1972–2011); WVVB (2011)
- Former frequencies: 1210 kHz (1925–1927); 1230 kHz (1927); 1240 kHz (1927–1928); 990 kHz (1928); 930 kHz (1928–1941)
- Call sign meaning: Derived from original WBRC call sign

Technical information
- Licensing authority: FCC
- Facility ID: 2112
- Class: B
- Power: 5,000 watts
- Transmitter coordinates: 33°32′02″N 86°51′07″W

Links
- Public license information: Public file; LMS
- Webcast: Listen live (via iHeartRadio)
- Website: wercfm.iheart.com

WERC (960 AM) is a commercial radio station licensed to Birmingham, Alabama, United States. It is owned by iHeartMedia and it simulcasts a talk radio format with sister station WERC-FM. The studios and offices are on First Avenue South in Birmingham, off Interstate 65.

WERC's transmitter is sited off Arkadelphia Road (U.S. Route 78) near Interstate 20/59 in Birmingham.

== History ==
=== Early years ===
The forerunner of WERC was the first radio station in Birmingham, and the second station in Alabama. It signed on the air on May 25, 1925. The call sign was WBRC, owned by Birmingham doctor J. C. Bell. The call letters stood for Bell Radio Corporation. It broadcast with 50 watts power on 1210 kilocycles from a transmitter in Bell's home. In 1928, businessman M. D. Smith bought a controlling stake in the station from Bell for $2,000.

Throughout the 1920s, the station increased its power several times and moved its broadcast frequency. It also relocated its studios, eventually moving to the Bankhead Hotel in downtown Birmingham by 1932. In 1935, the station became an affiliate of the NBC Red Network, carrying its schedule of dramas, comedies, news, sports, soap operas, game shows and big band broadcasts during the "Golden Age of Radio". In 1947, WBRC advertised that it "was the first radio station in the Deep South to subscribe to full day and night news wire service--INS".

Smith died in 1937 and his wife, Eloise, inherited the station. She remarried several years later, becoming Eloise Hanna. In 1940, she became full owner of WBRC, in an era where it was rare for a woman to serve as a radio executive. In 1941, with the enactment of the North American Regional Broadcasting Agreement (NARBA), WBRC moved from 950 to its current home at 960 AM. It also increased its fulltime power to 5,000 watts.

=== FM and TV stations ===
In 1946, WBRC introduced the first FM station in Birmingham. But few people owned FM receivers in those days and management decided to end the FM experiment, taking WBRC-FM off the air two years later. (A new WBRC-FM at 106.9 MHz signed on in 1959.)

In 1949, WBRC launched Channel 4 WBRC-TV, Alabama's second television station. Because WBRC had been a long-time NBC affiliate, WBRC-TV originally carried NBC TV shows, with secondary affiliations with ABC and the Dumont Television Network. The stations were sold to Storer Broadcasting in 1953. Four years later, the stations were sold to Taft Broadcasting.

=== MOR, Top 40 and AC ===
The advent of television in the 1950s caused network programming to shift from radio to television. By the early 1960s, WBRC was one of two Middle of the Road (MOR) stations in Birmingham, airing a mix of popular adult music, news and sports. It continued in that format until 1972, when Taft Broadcasting sold WBRC-AM-FM to Mooney Broadcasting. Taft retained ownership of WBRC-TV until 1987. As Federal Communications Commission (FCC) regulations at that time prohibited stations with different owners from sharing the same call letters, Mooney changed the call signs of the radio stations to WERC and WERC-FM—a nod to the old callsigns. WERC was christened "96-ERC" and it flipped to Top 40, launching an all-out assault on the market's leading contemporary hit station, WSGN (now WAGG).

For much of the 1970s, WERC and WSGN were two of the most listened-to stations in Birmingham. The beginning of WERC's demise as a Top 40 powerhouse came in 1977, when its own FM sister station was relaunched as contemporary hit radio (CHR) station WKXX, "Kicks 106" (now WBPT). By 1980, 960 WERC modified its format to full service, adult contemporary music coupled with a sizable news and sports department, and was known as "News Plus 960, WERC". In 1981, the station launched an afternoon drive time sports call-in show hosted by future University of Alabama football announcer Eli Gold.

=== Talk radio ===
Competing unsuccessfully against WSGN and WAPI as an adult contemporary station, WERC dropped music in May 1982. It flipped to a news-talk format, which continued until January 2011. The station was an early affiliate for the syndicated Rush Limbaugh Show. For much of the 1990s, the WERC line-up featured TC and John Ed as morning hosts, Paul Finebaum hosting a sports show in the afternoon, and Russ and Dee Fine hosting evenings.

During a 1993 snowstorm that paralyzed the Birmingham area, WERC became the primary source of information and assistance for hundreds of thousands of residents that were stranded by the weather without power, in some cases, for weeks. In 1997, WERC was bought by Capstar Broadcasting. Capstar was later acquired by San Antonio-based Clear Channel Communications.

=== Active rock ===
WERC began to transition its talk format to the FM dial on July 6, 2009, when a new incarnation of WERC-FM replaced modern rock station WVVB ("The Vulcan") at 105.5 FM. 960 AM simulcast with 105.5 FM until January 7, 2011, when it began originating separate programming, simulcasting on a new FM translator, 103.1 W276BQ.

After stunting with several formats, ranging from oldies to classic country to adult album alternative to urban contemporary, the station settled on a permanent format on January 13, 2011, reviving the "Vulcan" branding with an active rock format. In addition to broadcasting on 960 AM and 103.1 FM, "The Vulcan" also broadcast on WQEN-HD2 103.7. The transition was completed on February 15, 2011, when the WERC call sign was replaced with 105.5's former WVVB call letters.

=== Return to talk ===
On June 23, 2011, WVVB returned to news/talk, simulcasting on both 105.9 FM and 960 AM. On July 14, 2011, WVVB changed its call letters back to WERC.

In 2014, WERC's owner, Clear Channel Communications, became iHeartMedia, Inc. Other stations in the Birmingham market owned by iHeartMedia include WMJJ (96.5 FM), WDXB (102.5 FM), WQEN (103.7 FM), and WERC-FM (105.5 FM). iHeartMedia also programs W276BQ (103.1), a translator owned by Red Mountain Broadcasting, LLC. W276BQ rebroadcasts the programming of the HD2 channel of WQEN, branded as "103.1 The Beat".

== Programming ==
WERC was the first station in Birmingham to carry an all-talk format. Weekdays begin with a local news and interview show, Alabama's Morning News with JT and Leah. The rest of the weekday schedule is nationally syndicated shows, largely from co-owned Premiere Networks.
