= Harry Mabry =

American journalist

Harry Mabry (January 11, 1932 – January 10, 2004) was a television news director and anchor in Birmingham and Anniston, Alabama.

== Early life ==
Born January 11, 1932, in Philadelphia, Mabry moved with his parents to Birmingham at an early age. Following his graduation from Phillips High School in 1948, he attended the University of Alabama, where he received a degree in Radio-TV in 1953. Even before graduating college, he was employed as an announcer by WHMA Radio in Anniston from 1949 to 1952, and worked for a year at Atlanta's WAGA in 1952. From 1953 to 1956 he was a decorated Navy communications officer, serving primarily in Osaka, Japan.

== Career in Memphis ==
Following his discharge in 1956 and until 1958, Mabry was a staff announcer for WMCT-TV, now WMC-TV, in Memphis, Tennessee. Among other duties he hosted the live afternoon children's show "Looney Zoo" in his "Looney Zookeeper" uniform. The show was based around the Looney Tunes cartoons and included three puppet co-hosts and a live studio audience. Mabry also anchored local news casts at the station, and became notorious in Memphis for moving his desk from the studio to outside the station, conducting a late-night news cast in the season's first snowfall.

== Return to Birmingham ==
Mabry returned to Birmingham in 1958 as news editor and established editorial policy at WBRC-TV, channel 6, where he also worked as an on-air anchor. He remained in Birmingham with WBRC throughout the 1960s, where some of his most important reporting was on the civil rights movement. Mabry is responsible for much of the film footage documenting the civil rights movement in Birmingham, and was often seen standing to the side of protests attempting to protect his camera from the spray of the fire houses while continuing to film the altercations between the protestors and the Birmingham Police and Fire Departments.

== Move to Anniston ==
In 1969, Mabry moved to Anniston to launch WHMA-TV, channel 40 (a sister entity to his former employer), as both general manager and news director/anchor, remaining for twenty years. It was during this time that the station gained infamy when, following several phone calls in which he threatened to do so, an unemployed carpenter in a nearby town was filmed by a camera crew from Mabry's station as he set himself on fire in a drunken protest against unemployment. Mabry was very much affected by this incident, not only shaken by the fact that someone would commit such an act, but also frustrated by the public outcry that followed. It was never widely noted that local law enforcement failed to intervene and prevent the self-immolation, as they had promised.

In 1983 following a series of adverse Federal Communications Commission (FCC) and court rulings, the station was sold to Jacksonville State University, who renamed it WJSU. After only three years and at a $2.6 million profit, Jacksonville State sold the station, beginning a string of new owners. In 1989, Mabry returned to WBRC, and until 1991 Mabry was general manager of that station's East Alabama bureau, based in Anniston. After 1991 he continued in the field as a contract independent communications consultant, most notably developing a new television station in Gadsden, Alabama, and re-building a then dark WOXR (now WTAZ).

== Semi-retirement ==
Following a 1996 partial retirement, Mabry continued to consult internationally in the communications field, traveling to the former Soviet Union under the auspices of The Citizens Democracy Corps and International Executive Service Corps. Mabry and his wife lived and worked for up to six months at a time in cities including Arsenyev, Samarkand, Tbilisi and Tver, where he helped formerly government-run television stations cope with both their new-found independence and their sudden responsibility for everything from news content and presentation to advertising and general business practices. "The object is not to make their stations into American stations," Mabry said in a 2000 interview, "but to show them some techniques that are being done on American stations."

== Civic activities ==
Mabry was also noted for his civic activities, serving as president of the Anniston Museum of Natural History board of directors, a director on the Regions Bank Board, Junior Achievement of Anniston, a member of the Regional Medical Center Foundation Board, member and former president of The Knox Concert Series, Rotary Club president and others. He was a former president of the Alabama Broadcasting Association who received the Alabama Broadcasters of the Year Award in 1993 and the Outstanding Alumnus Award in 1983 from the University of Alabama School of Communications.

== Death ==
Mabry died at his home in Anniston, Alabama, on January 10, 2004, of a heart attack. He was 72.
