= WMJJ =

Radio station in Birmingham, Alabama

Coordinates: 33.444°N 86.880°W

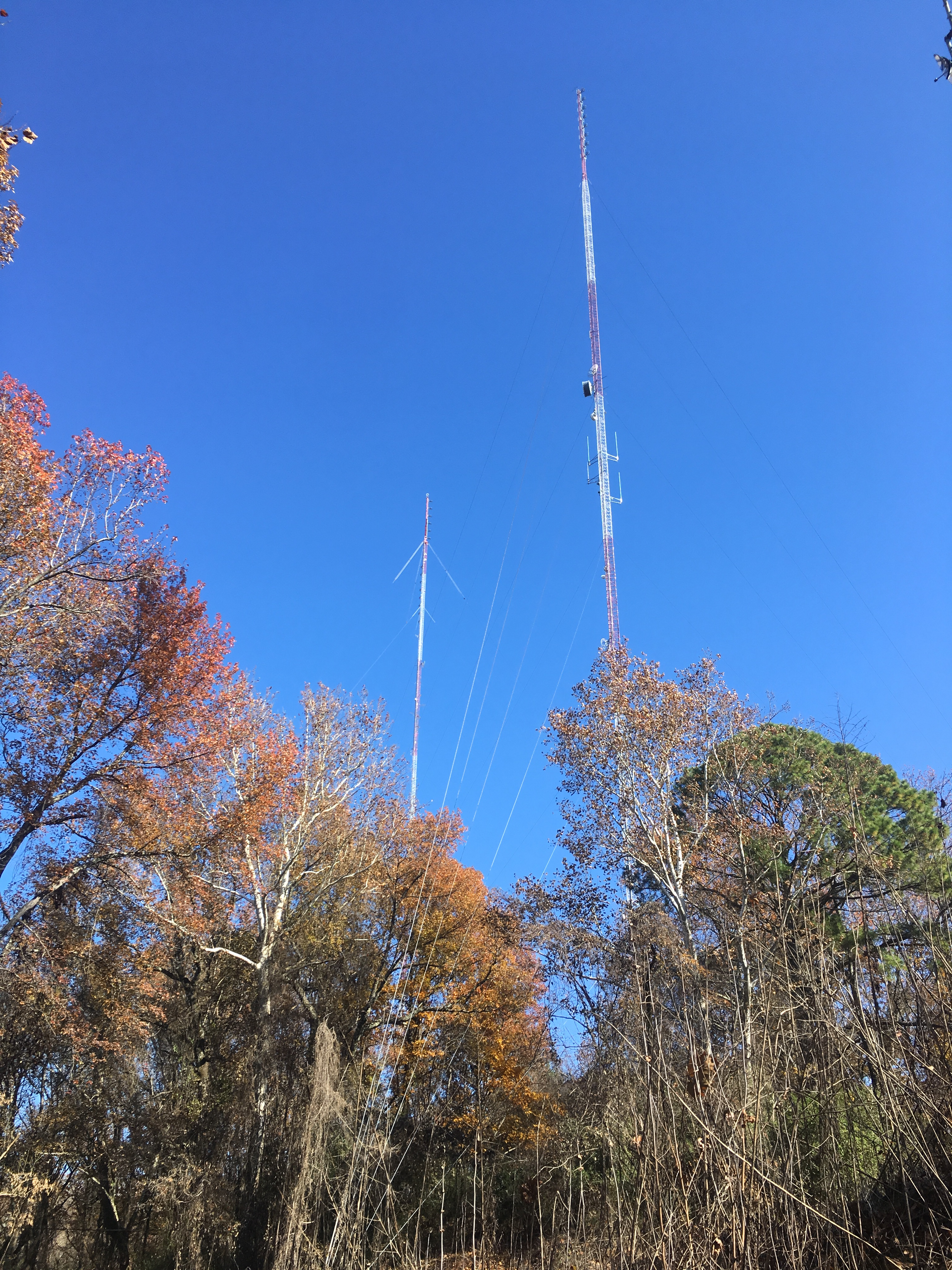
- Transmitter towers, including one for WMJJ, November 2019
- Birmingham, Alabama; United States
- Broadcast area: Greater Birmingham
- Frequency: 96.5 MHz (HD Radio)
- Branding: Magic 96.5

Programming
- Format: Adult contemporary
- Subchannels: HD3: K-Love
- Affiliations: Premiere Networks

Ownership
- Owner: iHeartMedia, Inc.; (iHM Licenses, LLC)
- Sister stations: WDXB; WERC; WERC-FM; WQEN

History
- First air date: June 1, 1961
- Former call signs: WCRT-FM (1961–1973); WQEZ (1973–1982)
- Call sign meaning: "Magic"

Technical information
- Licensing authority: FCC
- Facility ID: 2111
- Class: C0
- ERP: 100,000 watts
- HAAT: 313 meters (1,027 ft)
- Translator: HD3: 96.1 W241AI (Gorgas)

Links
- Public license information: Public file; LMS
- Webcast: Listen live (via iHeartRadio)
- Website: magic96.iheart.com

WMJJ (96.5 FM, "Magic 96.5") is a commercial radio station in Birmingham, Alabama. Owned by San Antonio-based iHeartMedia, it broadcasts an adult contemporary format. Studios are located on First Avenue South in Beacon Ridge Tower in Birmingham.

WMJJ has an effective radiated power (ERP) of 100,000 watts, the maximum for most FM stations. Its transmitter is atop the west end of the Red Mountain range, off Venice Road in Birmingham. WMJJ broadcasts using HD Radio technology. It carries a Christian adult contemporary format on its HD3 subchannel, branded as "K-Love", which feeds FM translator 96.1 W241AI in Gorgas.

== History ==
=== WCRT-FM and WQEZ ===
The station signed on the air on June 1, 1961. Its original call sign was WCRT-FM, broadcasting with 49,000 watts, half of its current output. Under the joint ownership of Chapman Radio & Television Company, WCRT-FM was the sister station of WCRT (1260 AM). For most of its first decade, the two stations simulcast the same programming.

In 1973, WCRT-FM was sold to Magic City Broadcasting. It moved to a taller antenna, increased power to an even 50,000 watts, and changed call letters to WQEZ. The EZ in the call sign reflected the station's switch to beautiful music. WQEZ played quarter hour sweeps of music with limited commercials and chatter.

In the late 1970s, the station increased its broadcast power to the present 100,000 watts. Throughout the 1970s, there was not much choice in FM programming in Birmingham. Most stations were either beautiful music or album oriented rock (AOR).

=== Magic 96 ===
The station was sold in 1982 to Capitol Broadcasting, a company owned primarily by radio group owner Ken Johnson. Ray Quinn, who had been Johnson's general manager at his property in Louisville, Kentucky, moved to Birmingham built a new management team. They changed WQEZ's format to adult contemporary on December 27 of that year. Until this time there were no FM stations in the market with this format. The stations that came closest to filling this niche were WSGN and WAPI. But they were full service radio stations with frequent breaks for news, commercials and chatter. The new name of the station was WMJJ "Magic 96", and it has retained that call sign, moniker and format since then.

Quinn's original team included program director Bill Thomas and sales manager Chris Gallu. Later, the sales team leadership included Steve Streiker who was General Sales Manager from 1983 until 1985. "Burt and Kurt" hosted the morning show during the station's early years, Charlie Walker did middays, and Jeff Tyson handled evenings, both crossing the street from top-ranked WKXX to join the station. When Bill Thomas left the programming chair to become VP/Programming for Capitol Broadcasting in the mid-1980's, John Jenkins was promoted to Program Director. He remained in that position until he left the station to program WMAG (also a Magic station) in Greensboro, North Carolina. He was succeeded by Smokey Rivers, who broadened WMJJ's playlist at night, with a few softer classic rock titles and a few oldies.

John Jenkins returned as vice president of programming at Ameron Broadcasting in the early 1990s and returned the station's focus to mainstream adult contemporary music. Under Ameron's ownership, the station remained consistently number one in women. It was sold to Capstar Broadcasting, which later merged with Clear Channel Communications, the original name of today's iHeartMedia. Magic 96 began a promotion in the early 1980s that remained a fixture on the station for nearly a decade, the "Magic Alabama Lottery". The promotion involved the mailing of numbered tickets to hundreds of thousands of Birmingham residents each Spring and Fall. One listener won $96,000, one of the largest cash prizes ever given away by a Birmingham radio station. The station also gave away a $175,000 home in that promotion in the mid 1990s.
