= WBRC =

Television station in Birmingham, Alabama

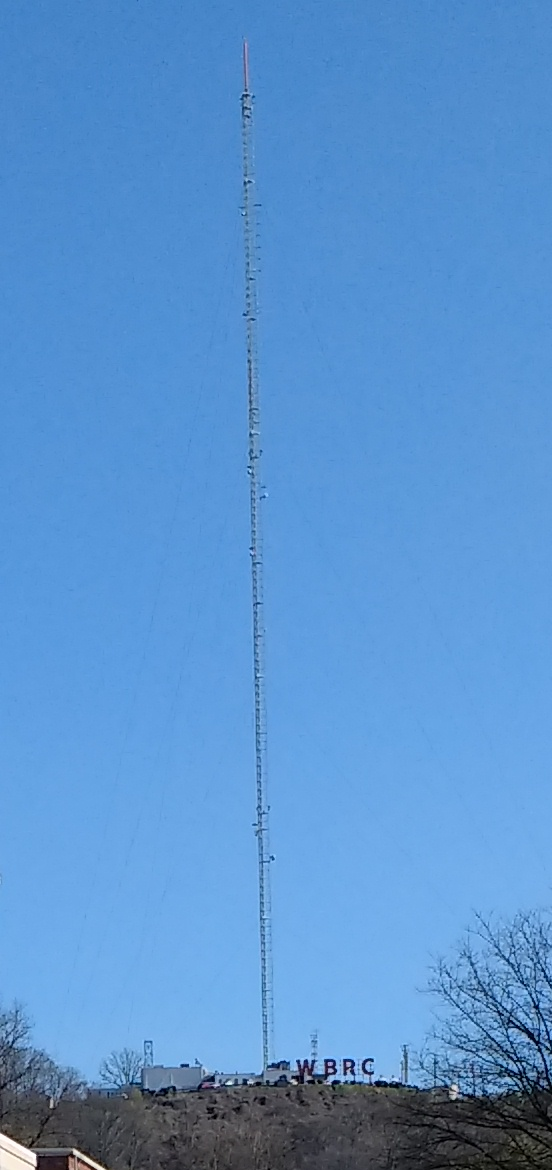
- WBRC broadcast tower, with the station's roof also visible; the neon sign seen in the lower portion of the image with the WBRC call letters is a local landmark, and inspired the station's call-centric logo
- Birmingham–Tuscaloosa–; Anniston, Alabama; United States
- City: Birmingham, Alabama
- Channels: Digital: 29 (UHF); Virtual: 6
- Branding: WBRC 6

Programming
- Affiliations: 6.1: Fox; for others, see § Subchannels

Ownership
- Owner: Gray Media; (Gray Television Licensee, LLC)
- Sister stations: WTBM-CD

History
- First air date: July 1, 1949
- Former call signs: WBRC-TV (1949–1999)
- Former channel numbers: Analog: 4 (VHF, 1949–1953), 6 (VHF, 1953–2009); Digital: 50 (UHF, 1999–2019)
- Former affiliations: NBC (1949–1954); DuMont (secondary, 1949–1953); ABC (secondary 1949–1961, primary 1961–1996); CBS (1954–1961)
- Call sign meaning: Bell Radio Company (taken from WBRC radio)

Technical information
- Licensing authority: FCC
- Facility ID: 71221
- ERP: 700 kW
- HAAT: 420 m (1,378 ft)
- Transmitter coordinates: 33°29′19″N 86°47′58″W

Links
- Public license information: Public file; LMS
- Website: www.wbrc.com

WBRC (channel 6) is a television station in Birmingham, Alabama, United States, affiliated with the Fox network. It is owned by Gray Media alongside low-power, Class A Telemundo affiliate WTBM-CD (channel 24). The two stations share studios and transmitter facilities atop Red Mountain (between Vulcan Trail and Valley View Drive) in southeastern Birmingham, next to the studios of NBC and CBS affiliate WVTM-TV (channel 13).

== History ==
=== Early history ===
The station first signed on the air on July 1, 1949, originally broadcasting on VHF channel 4 as WBRC-TV (standing for Bell Radio Company, after Fountain Heights physician J. C. Bell, founder of radio station WBRC (960 AM, now WERC); the "-TV" suffix was dropped from the call sign in June 1999). Although WBRC-TV was the first television station in Birmingham to be granted a license by the Federal Communications Commission (FCC), it is the second-oldest television station in Alabama, signing on just over one month after WAFM-TV (channel 13, now WVTM-TV), which debuted on May 29. It was originally owned by the Birmingham Broadcasting Company, run by Eloise D. Hanna, along with WBRC radio. Hanna's first husband, M. D. Smith, had bought WBRC radio from Bell in 1928. Her son, M. D. Smith III, who worked at the radio stations in advertising sales and was later promoted to program director and vice president, ran the television station as its operations manager. His son, M. D. Smith IV later organized Smith Broadcasting, which purchased WAFG-TV (channel 31) in Huntsville in 1963, with himself as operations manager. The call letters were immediately changed to WAAY-TV.

Originally broadcasting for three hours per day, it operated as a primary NBC affiliate (earning the affiliation as a result of WBRC radio's longtime affiliation with the NBC Red Network), and also carried secondary affiliations with ABC and the DuMont Television Network; during the late 1950s, the station was also briefly affiliated with the NTA Film Network. WBRC-TV originally operated from WBRC radio's facilities on 19th Street and 2nd Avenue, near downtown Birmingham, which originally only housed business and master control operations; the station originally relied mainly on network and film content for much of the programming it broadcast. The station's transmitter was originally purposed as the transmitter facilities for radio station WBRC-FM (102.5, now WBPT at 106.9 FM; original frequency now occupied by WDXB), which signed on in 1947 with the highest radiated power of any radio station worldwide, operating at 500,000 watts; after the FM station suspended operations in June 1948 due to continued revenue losses due to the lack of radios equipped with FM tuners, Hanna borrowed $150,000 to build a new studio facility and transmitter atop Red Mountain for the television station. In September 1950, WBRC established a coaxial cable link with fellow NBC-DuMont affiliate WRGB in Schenectady, New York, allowing the station to broadcast NBC and DuMont network programs both live and live-to-air.

On February 19, 1953, WBRC-TV moved to channel 6 as part of a frequency realignment ordered by the FCC, resulting from the Sixth Report and Order issued the year prior in 1952. This move was made to alleviate signal interference problems between WBRC and WSM-TV (now sister station WSMV-TV) in Nashville, which also transmitted on channel 4, that were present in portions of northern Alabama. Later that year, Hanna also sold the WBRC television and radio stations to Storer Broadcasting for $2.3 million—a handsome return on her first husband's purchase of WBRC radio 25 years earlier. George B. Storer, the company's founder and chairman, was a member of the board of directors at CBS, and most of his television stations were affiliates of that network. Storer may have used his leverage to secure a primary CBS affiliation for WBRC-TV, which joined the network on July 4, 1954. NBC programming subsequently moved to channel 13 (by then, using the call sign WABT); both stations, however, retained a secondary affiliation with ABC.

On September 17 of that year, the WBRC stations moved to a new, much larger studio facility located on Red Mountain that was built by Storer, where channel 6 continues to operate from to this day. The building, like many of those built by Storer to serve as studios for its broadcast properties, resembled an antebellum mansion. While it may have been out of place in most of Storer's other markets (many of which were located outside of the Southern United States), it was a perfect fit for Birmingham. Unusual for a commercial broadcaster, Storer supported educational television, and the company donated two transmitters and frequencies in the Birmingham market (channels 7 and 10, which were respectively occupied by WCIQ and WBIQ when both stations signed on in 1955) to Alabama Educational Television (now Alabama Public Television). This also, however, may have been a move to forestall future commercial competition in the market. Although Birmingham was large enough on paper to support three full network affiliates, the only remaining allocations were on UHF. WBRC and WABT would remain the only commercial stations in Birmingham until WBMG (now WIAT) debuted in October 1965, on UHF channel 42. That station had a signal considerably weaker than that of either channels 6 or 13, a problem which hampered that station's progress until the early 2000s.

In 1957, Storer sold the WBRC stations to Radio Cincinnati Inc., the forerunner of what would become Taft Broadcasting, for $2.3 million. Storer had to sell its broadcast holdings in Birmingham after it purchased radio station WIBG (now WNTP) in Philadelphia and its television sister, WPFH (later WVUE) in Wilmington, Delaware, to comply with the FCC's ownership limits of that time period.

=== As an exclusive ABC affiliate ===
On March 1, 1961, WBRC-TV signed an agreement with ABC to become a full-time affiliate of the network. This was very unusual for a market with only two commercial stations; usually, one or both stations carried ABC as a secondary affiliation, since that network would not be on anything resembling an equal footing with CBS and NBC until the 1970s. However, Taft had very good relations with ABC. The company's chairman was a personal friend of ABC's president Leonard Goldenson, and several of Taft's other stations, including flagship WKRC-TV in Cincinnati, had recently switched to ABC. During the 1970s, ABC aired cartoons from Hanna-Barbera, whose studios were acquired by Taft in 1967. Taft later bought ABC's former syndication arm, Worldvision Enterprises, in 1979. This also marked a significant turnaround for channel 6's relationship with the network, as during the later 1950s, the amount of ABC programming on WBRC had been dramatically reduced from about 50% of its schedule to only a very limited selection of shows, seemingly headed toward an exclusive CBS affiliation by 1960; even still, WBRC retained some of CBS's higher-rated soap operas on its daytime schedule until about 1968, when those programs moved to either WAPI-TV or WBMG.

Another factor, though supposedly not as important as the Taft-Goldenson relationship, was CBS News's apparent strong support of the Civil Rights Movement, which did not sit well with many white viewers, a large segment of WBRC's audience. An urban legend regarding the ABC affiliation agreement suggested that the switch was partly motivated by CBS' plans to air Who Speaks For Birmingham?, a controversial CBS Reports documentary focusing on desegregation at Birmingham City Schools that later led to journalist Howard K. Smith's resignation from CBS News after he quoted an anti-desegregation statement by political scientist Edmund Burke in the closing narration, viewed by network president William S. Paley as editorializing his views in support of school integration; however, the special aired on May 18 of that year, two months after the ABC agreement was signed.

Whatever the case, ABC reaped a major windfall when it affiliated with channel 6. ABC had very few full-time affiliates south of Washington, D.C. at the time, but now it had the full benefit of one of the South's strongest signals, best antenna locations and largest coverage areas. WBRC-TV's signal provided at least secondary coverage as far north as Decatur and extending south to near Montgomery, and from the Mississippi border in the west to the Georgia border in the east. In addition, although FM broadcasting was in its infancy at the time of the network switch, the advantage of channel 6's audio being heard at 87.7 FM at the far end of the FM dial would be taken advantage of by WBRC in promotional advertising up until the 2009 digital transition, allowing the station's audience to listen to the station and ABC network programming on both traditional radio receivers and car stereos. The station's weather department designed its presentations to relay information for both its traditional television and radio audiences in severe weather situations.

The station became exclusively affiliated with ABC on September 7, 1961; on that date, channel 13 (by then known as WAPI-TV) assumed rights to CBS and NBC programming, although WBRC continued to occasionally carry certain CBS shows that WAPI chose not to carry through 1965. In 1972, Taft sold the WBRC radio stations, which changed their call letters to WERC-AM and FM.

In 1966, WBRC-TV began broadcasting local programming in color, after the station purchased two color cameras; among the first local programs to be produced in color was the Alabama Crimson Tide football coaches' program, The Bear Bryant Show (originated from WCOV-TV in Montgomery, the first television station in the state to begin color broadcasts), which aired on WBRC until 1970, when it moved to WAPI-TV. Meanwhile, WBRC-TV had become one of ABC's strongest affiliates, a position it retained for the next quarter-century. For a time, it incorporated the ABC circle logo inside its own "6" logo (just as it had done with the CBS eye in the 1950s). Channel 6 could make a plausible claim to be not only the most-watched station in the Birmingham market but in the entire state of Alabama, thanks in part to unusually weak competition. WBMG was not a factor and, in fact, was among the lowest-rated major-network affiliates in the nation at some points, making Birmingham a de facto two-station market to industry observers from the late 1960s to the mid-1990s. Even still, due to signal impairment in mountainous areas of northeastern Alabama, WBRC operated two low-power translators to extend its programming to that part of the state, W29AO (channel 29) in Anniston in W15AP (channel 15) in Gadsden.

In 1982, WBRC began receiving ABC network and syndicated programming, and news footage via satellite. In 1984, the station became one of the first television stations in the region to adopt a 24-hour-a-day programming schedule. After it suffered significant structural damage due to an ice storm that affected the Southeastern U.S. in the winter of 1985, the station's original transmitter tower was replaced in 1986, with a new tower on Red Mountain 3 miles (4.8 km) east of the original tower's location. In October 1987, Taft was restructured into Great American Communications following the completion of a hostile takeover of the group. In December 1993, Great American Communications was restructured again into Citicasters after filing for Chapter 11 bankruptcy. Citicasters then decided to put most of its television stations up for sale. These moves, though, did not immediately affect WBRC's high standing in the ratings or its reputation in the community.

=== As a Fox station ===
On May 5, 1994, Great American Communications (which would later be renamed Citicasters following the completion of its restructuring) agreed to sell WBRC and three other television stations—WDAF-TV in Kansas City, KSAZ-TV in Phoenix and WGHP in High Point, North Carolina—to New World Communications—for $350 million in cash and $10 million in share warrants. However, three weeks later, New World agreed to purchase four stations owned by Argyle Television Holdings, WVTM being among them, in a purchase option-structured deal for $717 million (although the transfer/assignment applications for the stations involved in the Argyle purchases were not filed with the FCC until after New World's acquisition of the four Citicasters stations was completed); this posed a problem for New World on two counts. At the time, the FCC forbade any broadcasting company from owning two commercial television stations in the same market; in addition, the concurrent acquisitions of the Argyle and Citicasters stations put New World three stations over the national television ownership cap that the agency enforced at the time, which allowed broadcasters to own a maximum of twelve stations nationwide.

On May 23, 1994, New World signed an affiliation agreement with Fox to switch twelve television stations—six that New World had already owned and eight that the company was in the process of acquiring through the Argyle and Citicasters deals, including WBRC—to the network, in exchange for the latter's then-parent company News Corporation purchasing a 20% equity stake in New World; the stations would become Fox affiliates once their affiliation contracts with existing network partners expired (with the first stations involved in the deal switching to the network in September 1994). Although the network's Birmingham charter affiliate, WTTO (channel 21), was one of Fox's strongest affiliates at the time, the network found the chance to align with WBRC too much to resist. Not only was it a VHF station, but it had been central Alabama's dominant station for 30 years at the time. The group's affiliation deal with Fox also gave New World a chance to solve its ownership problem by reaching an agreement with Citicasters to sell WBRC and WGHP directly to the network's owned-and-operated station group, Fox Television Stations.

Fox was unable to immediately purchase the two stations outright due to questions over the American citizenship of then-parent company News Corporation's Australian-born CEO Rupert Murdoch. New World then decided to acquire the stations itself, but place them in an outside trust company that it established; New World would sell the stations to Fox Television Stations, which, in turn, would pay the group $130 million in promissory notes upon the transfer's completion. New World formally filed an application with the FCC to transfer WBRC to the trust on October 12, 1994, one month after it filed to transfer WGHP on September 9; the FCC approved the transfer on April 3, 1995. Under the arrangement, New World owned the licenses of both stations, while Citicasters continued to control their operations under outsourcing agreements. In April 1995, Citicasters transferred the operations of WBRC and WGHP to Fox Television Stations, which took over operational control through time brokerage agreements with New World and purchased the stations three months later on July 22; Fox formally finalized the purchase of the two stations on January 17, 1996.

Although it was now owned by the O&O group of another network, Fox now had to run channel 6 as an ABC affiliate for more than a year after the purchase was announced as WBRC's affiliation agreement with that network was not set to expire until August 31, 1996. This gave ABC a sufficient amount of time to find another station to replace channel 6 as its central Alabama affiliate. In January 1996, ABC struck a deal with Allbritton Communications to affiliate with CBS stations WCFT-TV (channel 33, now Heroes & Icons affiliate WSES) in Tuscaloosa and WJSU-TV (channel 40, now Heroes & Icons affiliate WGWW) in Anniston (the latter of which Allbritton had agreed to operate under a local marketing agreement with then-owner Osborne Communications Corporation weeks prior); because Tuscaloosa and Anniston were then separate markets, which would result in neither station being counted in Nielsen ratings reports for Birmingham, Allbritton purchased low-power station W58CK (channel 58, now WBMA-LD), creating a triple-simulcast with WCFT and WJSU, which would act as its satellite stations.

WBRC became a Fox owned-and-operated station on September 1, 1996, ending its affiliation with ABC after 47 years; however, the station had begun airing the network's short-lived morning program Fox After Breakfast for one month prior to the switch after it dropped Good Morning America from its schedule. The concurrent move of the ABC affiliation to W58CK and its satellites also led to the CBS affiliation for the Anniston-Gadsden market to move to WNAL-TV (channel 44, now Ion Television owned-and-operated station WPXH-TV), which—along with WTTO and its Tuscaloosa satellite WDBB (channel 17)—lost its Fox affiliation to WBRC.

With the switch to Fox, WBRC became one of only a few television stations in the United States to have maintained primary affiliations with all of the Big Three networks, and the only one in the country to have had primary affiliations with all four current major networks; it also became the first network-owned commercial television station in the state of Alabama. At that time, WBRC phased out its longstanding "Channel 6" brand and began branding itself as "Fox 6", becoming one of three Fox stations affected by the affiliation deal between the network and New World to adopt Fox's standardized station branding conventions prior to the group's 1996 merger with Fox Television Stations (WGHP and WJBK in Detroit, which became a sister station to WBRC as a result of the New World merger, were the only others to comply with the network's branding techniques; the remaining ten stations did not incorporate network branding until after the merger was finalized). After New World merged with Fox in 1997, WBRC was reunited with four of its sister stations from the Storer era: WJBK, WAGA-TV in Atlanta, WJW in Cleveland and WITI in Milwaukee.

WBRC would become the only remaining station in the Birmingham–Tuscaloosa–Anniston market that was owned by a major commercial broadcast television network, after Media General completed its acquisition of WVTM from NBC Television Stations on June 26, 2006. However, on December 22, 2007, Fox announced that it had entered into an agreement to sell WBRC and seven other Fox owned-and-operated stations (WDAF-TV, WGHP, WJW, WITI, KTVI in St. Louis, KDVR in Denver and KSTU in Salt Lake City) to Local TV, a holding company operated by equity firm Oak Hill Capital Partners that had earlier purchased The New York Times Company's television station division; the sale was finalized on July 14, 2008. On January 6, 2009, Local TV announced that it would trade WBRC to Raycom Media in exchange for acquiring CBS affiliate WTVR-TV in Richmond, Virginia from that group. Raycom—which was controlled by the Retirement Systems of Alabama—was headquartered in Montgomery (the market to the adjacent south of the Birmingham DMA), and also owned that market's NBC affiliate WSFA as well as Huntsville NBC affiliate WAFF. The transfer closed on March 31, 2009.

On June 25, 2018, Atlanta-based Gray Television announced it had reached an agreement with Raycom to merge their respective broadcasting assets (consisting of Raycom's 63 existing owned-and/or-operated television stations, including WBRC), and Gray's 93 television stations) under the former's corporate umbrella. The cash-and-stock merger transaction valued at $3.6 billion—in which Gray shareholders would acquire preferred stock currently held by Raycom—resulted in WBRC gaining new sister stations in adjacent markets, including ABC affiliate WTOK-TV in Meridian and CBS/NBC affiliates WTVY and WRGX-LD in Dothan (while separating it from WDFX), in addition to the current Raycom stations. The sale was approved on December 20 and completed on January 2, 2019.

== Programming ==
WBRC currently carries the majority of the Fox network schedule, though it delays the network's Saturday late night block (currently a repeat of a prime time reality show) one hour due to the station's 10 p.m. newscast and its carriage of the syndicated sports interview program In Depth with Graham Bensinger; in addition, following the program's move from Fox Sports 1 to Fox in September 2015, WBRC formerly was one of several Fox affiliates that has declined carriage of the Sunday pre-game show Fox NFL Kickoff during the NFL regular season due to existing programming contracts (unlike in other markets where a Fox station has declined carriage of Fox NFL Kickoff, the program was not broadcast by any other station in the Birmingham–Tuscaloosa–Anniston market). The station began clearing Fox NFL Kickoff for the 2016 season. Channel 6 has only aired Fox's prime time, news and sports programming since it joined the network in September 1996, with the only programs relating to Fox's children's programming blocks for the final twelve years that Fox carried programming aimed at that demographic consisting of fall preview specials and network promotions that aired within the network's prime time lineup.

WBRC became the first television station to broadcast the United Cerebral Palsy Telethon, an event to raise money for the cerebral palsy research organization that premiered in 1949; it was from WBRC that the event emerged into national prominence, with national celebrities even making appearances on the telecast. Even in its final years on WBRC, mini-documentaries produced by the station (which were produced by Randy Mize and Tom Stovall) for the local segments aired during the UCP Telethon; WBRC stopped producing and broadcasting the local segments of the telethon soon after it switched to Fox in 1996. WBRC began producing live local programming in 1950 after it converted the building that formerly housed WBRC-FM into a makeshift television studio; the station also acquired additional studio camera equipment, including shows such as Coffee Break, Supersonic Sam and Cowboy Theatre.

Like many network affiliates, WBRC-TV would preempt ABC programming occasionally or regularly, in some cases. For example, according to local legends, the station initially turned down Bewitched, not because it was concerned about witchcraft, but because it concerned a mixed marriage (between a witch and a mortal); there were fears that Bewitched would encourage what some segregationists referred to as "cross-breeding"; channel 6 would not clear Bewitched until 1967 (although, according to the October 15, 1965, issue of The Birmingham News, Bewitched was shown airing at its in-pattern time of Thursdays at 8 p.m. (Central) on WBRC). Channel 6 continued these practices for most of its years with ABC. It also preempted the ABC Evening News (the forerunner to World News Tonight) from the program's debut in 1968 until August 7, 1972 (when both it and WJRT-TV in Flint, Michigan, became the last two ABC affiliates to begin airing the network newscast), as well as daytime network programs at aired during the 10 a.m. hour. However, ABC largely brushed off the preemption issue, even though it would eventually become the No. 1 network nationwide by the late 1970s, because of WBRC's status as central Alabama's dominant station.

WBRC cemented viewer allegiances by carrying a heavy schedule of local programs during the 1960s and 1970s, most notably two long-running morning shows. The first was The Morning Show, hosted by sports anchor Tom York; airing for 32 years from 1957 to 1989, it was a more general-interest interview and features program that was formatted basically a local version of Today; WBRC anchor Joe Langston (who also hosted the children's programs Birthday Party and Junior Auction for the station in the late 1960s) and comedian Fannie Flagg joined as York's co-hosts in the early 1960s (Flagg would leave for Los Angeles in 1964 to become a writer for Candid Camera). Fiddler, guitarist and vocalist Eddie Burns was invited to bring his musical group to serve as The Morning Show's house band and act as the program's bandleader; however, within a few months, station management offered Burns his own morning program on channel 6. That series, Country Boy Eddie, which was aimed at rural Alabama viewers, featured local country, bluegrass and Southern Gospel music artists during its 36-year run from 1957 until December 31, 1993. Over time, Burns added novelty acts to the show's format and did most of the commercials himself in the studio live.

York's program, meanwhile, was so popular that, when ABC debuted AM America in January 1975, WBRC declined to carry it—preferring not to alter, let alone cancel, what had become a local television institution in The Morning Show; this continued after ABC replaced the more news-driven AM America with Good Morning America, which maintained a format similar to York's program, in November of that year. WBRC began to clear the first hour of GMA in the early 1980s, and began airing the two-hour program in its entirety after York retired from the station in 1989. Preemptions and out-of-pattern scheduling of some ABC programs would continue in later years; for example, WBRC aired All My Children on a one-day delay from its 1970 debut until it became a Fox station, and preempted the soap opera Loving throughout its 1986 to 1994 run.

Channel 6 originally planned to carry the entire Fox programming schedule when it switched to the network, including its children's program block, Fox Kids; it intended to air the weekday editions of that block from 1 to 4 p.m. on Monday through Friday afternoons. However, in what would be the catalyst to a change in the carriage policies for Fox Kids that allowed stations the option of either airing the block or being granted the right to transfer the rights to another station in the market, Sinclair Broadcast Group approached WBRC about retaining the rights to Fox Kids for WTTO, which became an independent station on September 1; Fox allowed WTTO to retain the local rights to the block. WBRC also declined to carry Weekend Marketplace, the infomercial block that Fox replaced its remaining Saturday morning children's programming block with in January 2009; the rights were instead acquired by WABM. WBRC and WGHP were the only Fox-owned stations that did not air the network's children's program blocks until 2003, when now-former sister stations KTTV in Los Angeles and WFLD in Chicago moved the block to their UPN-affiliated sister stations (KCOP-TV and WPWR-TV).

On September 17, 2024, Gray and the New Orleans Pelicans announced a broader deal to form the Gulf Coast Sports & Entertainment Network, which would broadcast nearly all 2024–25 Pelicans games on Gray's stations in the Gulf South, including WBRC.

=== News operation ===
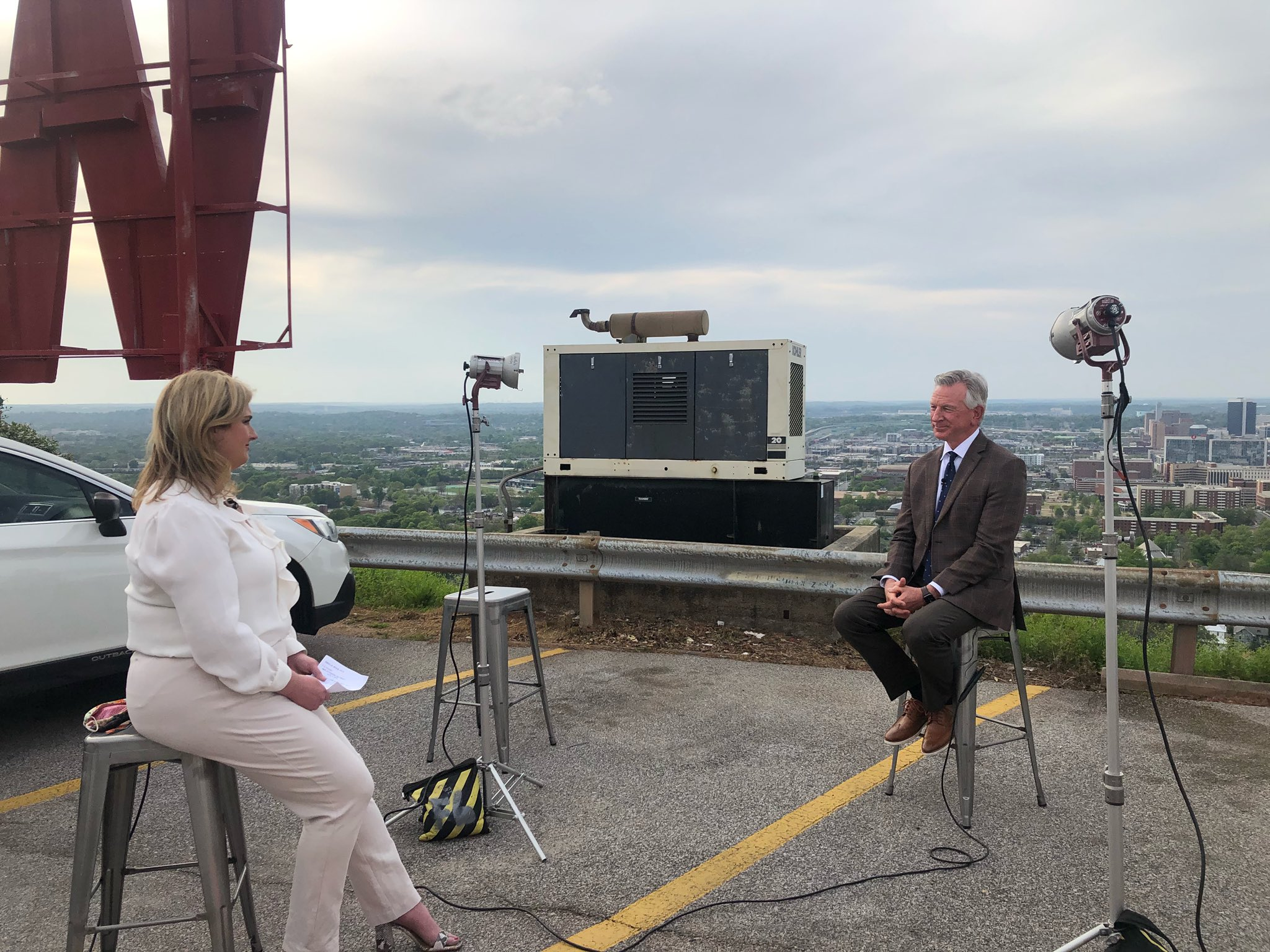
Senator Tommy Tuberville being interviewed outside at WBRC in 2021, with the neon "W" in the station's landmark bluff sign seen to the left.

WBRC presently broadcasts 64 1/2 hours of locally produced newscasts each week (with 11 hours each weekday, 4 1/2 hours on Saturdays and five hours on Sundays); in regards to the number of hours devoted to news programming, it is the highest local newscast output in the state of Alabama. In addition, the station produces Fox 6 Sideline, a high school football program that debuted in September 1989 as an ABC affiliate, which airs Friday nights after the 10 p.m. newscasts during the fall. The station has the largest news staff of any television station in Alabama, with around half of its approximately 160 employees employed with the news department in on-air, administrative and production positions.

==== News department history ====
WBRC has been the ratings leader in the market for much of its history, dating back to its tenure as an ABC affiliate. Its newscasts were also among the highest-rated local news programs in the United States during the 1960s and 1970s; WBRC had won practically every news timeslot for many years, with WAPI-TV/WVTM-TV coming in a distant second until the mid-2000s; CBS affiliate WBMG/WIAT was not a factor for either station for most of its history (to the point where it did not even air any newscasts at three different periods between the early 1980s and February 1998). As a Fox station, WBRC has continued to maintain higher viewership than the other television news outlets in the market, although it has experienced tighter competition since the early 2000s against WBMA-LD and a resurgent WIAT (both of which currently engage in a spirited competition for second place); WBRC's 9 p.m. newscast has consistently ranked as one of the most-watched prime time newscasts in the U.S. for most of its run since its debut in 1996.

WBRC television's news operations began with the launch of the station in 1949, originally consisting of five-minute-long newscasts at sign-on and sign-off that were originally anchored by operations manager M.D. Smith III, who read wire copies of local news headlines over a slide of the station's logo. In September 1950, at which time newscasts were expanded to 15 minutes, anchor segments began to be conducted in-studio after it acquired camera equipment to recorded live programming; kinescopes of 16-mm film footage shot by a photographer for local stories and still photographs for illustration of national and international stories were used for story content. The station launched a full-scale news department in 1952, when it began operating from the former studios of the original WBRC-FM. Several members of the news department staff in its early years started at WBRC radio including news anchors Harry Mabry and Joe Langston (the latter of whom would also take on a management role as its director of news and editorial policy in 1969), and sports anchor Tom York. In 1969, former WSGN radio anchor Bill Bolen joined WBRC to replace Harry Mabry as the station's main news anchor; Bolen would remain a fixture at channel 6 (eventually becoming anchor of the station's weekday morning newscast in 1990) for 42 years until his retirement in 2010. In 1978, WBRC became the first television station in the Birmingham market to acquire a microwave truck for electronic news-gathering purposes, and became the first to provide live breaking news coverage on-scene.

The station would not begin producing half-hour evening newscasts until 1979, eleven years after ABC expanded its national evening newscast to 30 minutes. Station management declined ABC's insistence that WBRC expand its 6 p.m. newscast to match the length of the ABC Evening News; however, the 15-minute local newscast beat The Huntley-Brinkley Report on WAPI-TV/WVTM and the CBS Evening News on WBMG in the ratings. In 1979, channel 6 became the first television station in Alabama to acquire a helicopter for newsgathering, "Chopper 6". In 1983, Bev Montgomery made history as the first African American to anchor a newscast in the Birmingham market when he was appointed anchor of the station's weekend evening newscasts. In 1988, the station acquired satellite news-gathering vehicles, "Skylink 6", to conduct and beam live remote footage transmitted to the studio via satellite.

After WBRC became a Fox station in September 1996, the station shifted its programming focus heavily towards local news, increasing its output from about 25 hours a week to around 40 hours. The station retained all of the newscasts that existed during its final years as an ABC affiliate, but expanded its weekday morning newscast from one to three hours (with the addition of a two-hour extension, known for most of its run as Good Day Alabama, from 7 to 9 a.m.), and bridged the separate 5 and 6 p.m. newscasts on Monday through Friday nights to form a 90-minute early-evening news block (by adding a half-hour newscast at 5:30). Channel 6 also launched a prime time newscast at 9 p.m. to compensate for the lack of prime time programming provided by Fox during that hour; however, it filled the 9:30 p.m. half-hour with syndicated programs (originally reruns of Seinfeld, then from 1997 afterward, Jeopardy!) as a tentpole between the 9 and 10 p.m. newscasts from the September 1996 switch until September 2002, when it expanded the prime time newscast to one hour (WBRC is one of several Fox stations that offer newscasts in both the final hour of prime time and the traditional late news timeslot, one of the few affiliated with the network that runs a nightly newscast in the latter slot and one of the few to continue its Big Three-era late-evening newscast after switching to Fox). In addition to compensating for the absence of daily national morning and evening newscasts on Fox's schedule, the expansion of WBRC's news lineup also filled timeslots vacated by the departures of Good Morning America and World News Tonight through the discontinuance of its ABC affiliation. WBRC also lost several longtime anchors and reporters to the W58CK/WCFT/WJSU trimulcast at that time, including news anchors Linda Mays and Brenda Ladun, meteorologists James Spann (who himself reportedly left WBRC due to his disapproval over the edgier content of Fox's programming) and Mark Prater, and sports anchor Mike Raita.

In 2009, WBRC became a founding member station of the Raycom News Network, a service created to allow the sharing of news resources among the four Raycom-owned television stations serving Alabama—including NBC affiliate WSFA in Montgomery, NBC affiliate WAFF in Huntsville and ABC affiliate WTVM in Columbus, Georgia (the latter of which includes a portion of eastern Alabama in its service area)—which combined, cover almost half of Alabama's population. The service allowed the stations to pool story content seen on the stations' newscasts and websites, as well as share information and newsgathering equipment (such as satellite trucks). The four stations also comprised the Raycom Weather Network and the Raycom Alabama Weather Blog, where meteorologists from all four stations posted forecasts and storm reports, and which provided live feeds from cameras and Doppler weather radar systems that each of the stations operated (the only Raycom-owned station in Alabama that did not participate in the arrangement was fellow Fox affiliate WDFX-TV in Dothan, whose news programming was produced by WSFA under a news share agreement and is no longer a sister station to those other stations).

On July 14, 2009, the station eliminated its Saturday evening 5 p.m. newscast due to budget cutbacks at the station spurred by the economic downturn. On October 26, 2009, WBRC became the second television station in the Birmingham-Tuscaloosa-Anniston market (after WVTM-TV)—and the third station in Alabama—to begin broadcasting its local newscasts in high definition; the news set and the graphics were also redesigned as part of the transition.

On September 12, 2016, the station debuted a 4 p.m. newscast, placing the station in competition with WVTM and WBMA, which have both aired 4 p.m. newscasts for several years.

==== Controversy ====
===== David Neal lawsuit =====
In May 2008, David Neal (who had been with WBRC since 1997) filed a breach of contract and fraud lawsuit against WBRC and members of the station's management team, after he was fired as chief meteorologist of the station's weather department without explanation that March. The station denied any wrongdoing, and began defending the lawsuit. In July 2008, the station announced that James-Paul Dice—a former meteorologist at CBS affiliate WHNT-TV in Huntsville—would replace Neal as chief meteorologist. On July 29, 2008, the parties to the lawsuit filed a stipulation of dismissal, stating that the dispute had been resolved in mediation. The terms of the settlement were not immediately disclosed. Neal now works for WeatherNation as chief meteorologist.

==== Notable former on-air staff ====
- Wynette Byrd (Tammy Wynette) – featured performer on Country Boy Eddie
- Fannie Flagg – co-host of The Morning Show (1960s)
- Eli Gold – sports anchor (1981–1989)
- Mike Hogewood – sports anchor (1981–1986)
- Larry Langford – reporter (1970s)
- Don Lemon – weekend anchor (1996–1997)
- Harry Mabry – anchor (1960s–1970s)
- Mai Martinez – general assignment reporter
- James Spann – meteorologist (1989–1996)
- Sally Wiggin – anchor/reporter (1977–1980)
- Tom York – sports anchor/host of WBRC's long-running The Morning Show (1957–1989)

== Technical information ==
=== Subchannels ===
The station's signal is multiplexed:

Subchannels of WBRC
Subchannel	Res.	Short name	Programming
6.1	720p	WBRC	Fox
6.2	480i	365BLK	365BLK
6.3	480i	GCSEN	Gulf Coast SEN
6.4	480i	Oxygen	Oxygen
6.5	480i	OUTLAW	Outlaw
6.6	480i	Quest	Quest
21.4	480i	ROAR	Roar (WTTO)

Broadcast on behalf of another station

=== Analog-to-digital conversion ===
WBRC shut down its analog signal, over VHF channel 6, at 8:55 a.m. on June 12, 2009, the official date on which full-power television stations in the United States transitioned from analog to digital broadcasts under federal mandate. The station's digital signal remained on its pre-transition UHF channel 50, using virtual channel 6.

The station operated its digital transmission facilities under special temporary authorization at a lower effective radiated power until October 2009, when its transmitter was upgraded to full power at 1 megawatt at a position on the tower at 373 meters (1,224 ft). The FCC later granted WBRC to reclaim the top level of the tower for its main antenna, improving its digital coverage area (the former main antenna remains in use as an auxiliary antenna).
