= WQEN =

Contemporary hit radio station in Birmingham, Alabama

Coordinates: 33.444°N 86.880°W

- Trussville, Alabama; United States
- Broadcast area: Birmingham metropolitan area - Northern and Central Alabama
- Frequency: 103.7 MHz (HD Radio)
- Branding: 103.7 The Q

Programming
- Format: Contemporary hit radio
- Subchannels: HD2: Mainstream urban
- Affiliations: Premiere Networks

Ownership
- Owner: iHeartMedia, Inc.; (iHM Licenses, LLC)
- Sister stations: WDXB, WERC, WERC-FM, WMJJ

History
- First air date: October 7, 1966
- Former call signs: WJBY-FM (CP, 1966); WLJM (1966–1975)
- Call sign meaning: Queen City (refers to Gadsden, the station's former city of license)

Technical information
- Licensing authority: FCC
- Facility ID: 22997
- Class: C1
- ERP: 100,000 watts
- HAAT: 285 meters (935 ft)
- Translator: HD2: 103.1 W276BQ (Birmingham)

Links
- Public license information: Public file; LMS
- Webcast: Listen live (via iHeartRadio); Listen live (HD2)
- Website: 1037theq.iheart.com

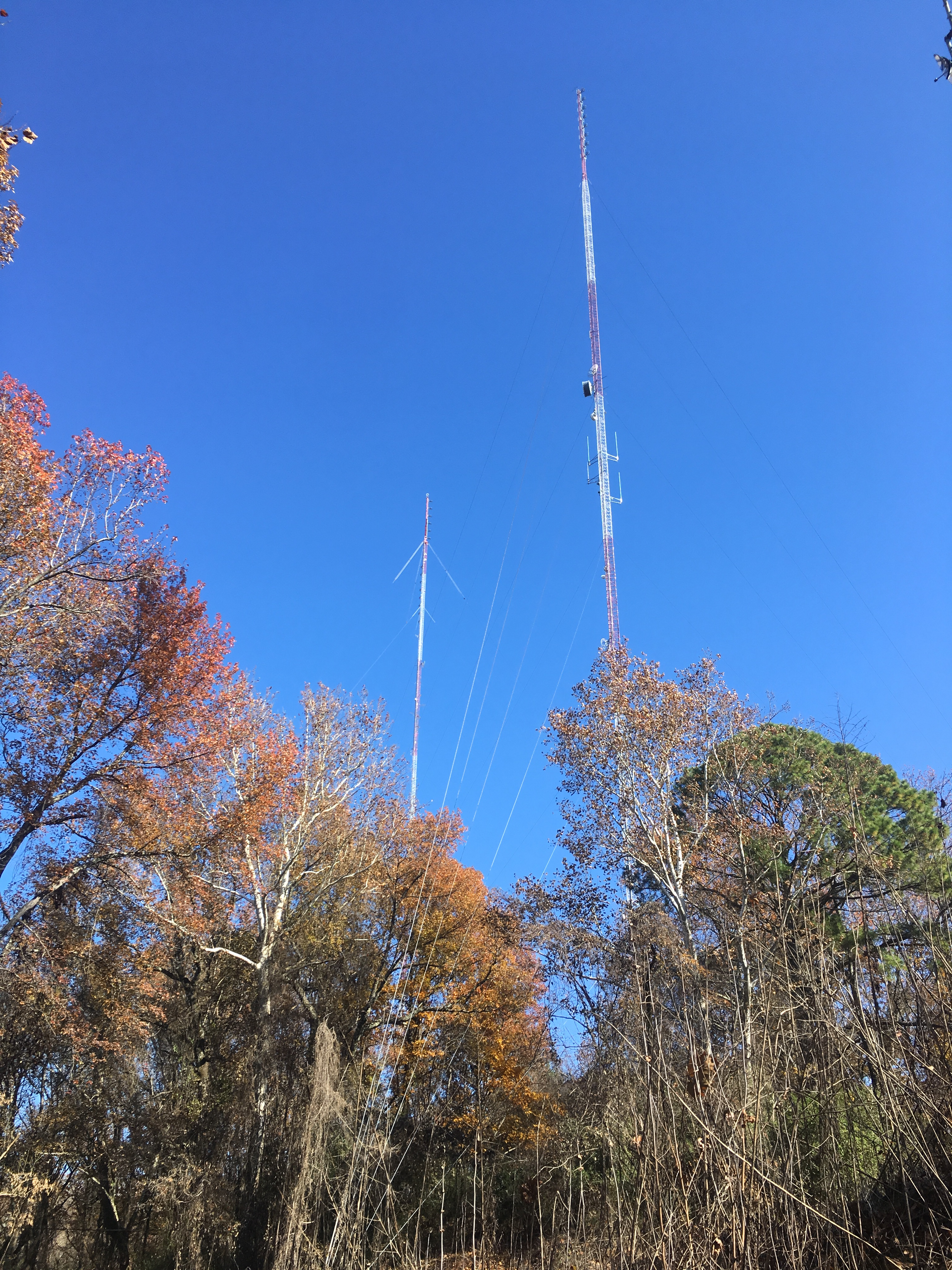
Transmitter towers, including one for WQEN, November 2019

WQEN (103.7 FM, "103.7 the Q") is a commercial radio station licensed to Trussville, Alabama, and serving the Birmingham metropolitan area. It airs an adult-leaning contemporary hit radio format and is owned by iHeartMedia, Inc. Studios and offices are at Beacon Ridge Tower on First Avenue South in Birmingham.

WQEN is a Class C1 station. It has an effective radiated power (ERP) of 100,000 watts, the maximum for most FM stations. The transmitter is off Venice Road on the west end of the Red Mountain range. WQEN broadcasts using HD Radio technology. Its HD2 subchannel carries an urban contemporary format known as "The Beat" which feeds FM translator W276BQ at 103.1 MHz.

== History ==
=== Beautiful music ===
The station signed on the air on October 7, 1966. The original call sign was WLJM, licensed to Gadsden. The call letters stood for Lloyd, John and Mary Faye, the three children of original owner Charlie Boman.

WLJM was the sister station to WJBY 930 AM (now WGAD). WLJM had a beautiful music format, playing quarter-hour sweeps of soft, instrumental music using the Shulkie format with limited commercials and chatter. It was mostly automated.

=== Top 40 ===
In 1974, WLJM was sold to Charles Smithgall and Mike McDougald, who operated WAAX 570 AM, also in Gadsden. The following year, it took its current call letters, which stand for "Queen City," a nickname for Gadsden. It had the nickname "Alabama's Music Giant." WQEN became one of the first Top 40 stations in Alabama to broadcast exclusively on the FM dial, under the direction of Rick Sisk, Program Director. WQEN has remained a Top 40 station for most of the last half century.

By 1976, the transmitter for WQEN was moved to Steele, some 15 miles (24 km) south of Gadsden. The power of its signal was increased to 100,000 watts. This enabled the station to cover not just the Gadsden area but many parts of the Birmingham metropolitan area. During this time, WQEN had several monikers: "Super Q104, WQEN", "SuperHot Q104", and "Q104 WQEN, The Southern Super Giant". General Manager Wiley Post led the station with contests, on-location giveaways, and promotions. Except for a brief period in the late 1980s when the station was known as "103.7 QFM", the station was called "Q104" for over 20 years.

=== Moving into Birmingham market ===
Until the mid 1990s, WQEN was primarily focused on Gadsden, Anniston and Eastern Alabama. In August 1991, WQEN adjusted the format from Top 40/CHR to adult contemporary. But it switched back to Top 40 after a short time.

In 1998, WQEN began broadcasting from a tower near Springville, enabling its signal to cover the entire Birmingham market. It also moved its studios into Birmingham. The station was rebranded under the "103.7 The Q" moniker in June. At about the same time that the station focused on the Birmingham market, it began simulcasting on WQEM (101.5 FM), licensed to Columbiana. The simulcast continued until 2002, when WQEM was sold to Glen Iris Baptist School in Birmingham, a Christian radio organization that also owns WGIB.

WQEN was the first Top 40 station in the Birmingham market since WAPI-FM (I-95) dropped the format in 1994. Ironically, a second station in the market adopted the same format a few months later when WEDA, known on the air as Hot 97.3, signed on. That station changed formats in 2000. The WQEN DJ line-up featured Rick and Bubba in the mornings, Scott Bohannon (formerly of WAPI-FM/I-95) in middays, and Luka (formerly of WRAX/107.7 The X) in the afternoons.

=== Changes in ownership and transmitter location ===
In August 2000, WQEN was acquired by Clear Channel Communications. Then in 2014, Clear Channel changed its name to iHeartMedia.

In 2005, WQEN was one of several stations in north Alabama and southern Tennessee that changed either their city of license, broadcast frequency, or both. As a result, WQEN, is now licensed to Trussville rather than Gadsden. It began broadcasting from Red Mountain in Birmingham, greatly improving its signal in Jefferson County and Shelby County.
