= List of radio stations in Alabama =

The following is a list of FCC-licensed radio stations in the U.S. state of Alabama, which can be sorted by their call signs, frequencies, cities of license, licensees, and programming formats.

== List of radio stations ==
Call sign	Frequency	City of license	Licensee	Format
KGDH-LP	104.5 FM	Mobile	Mobile Hispanic Education Family Foundation	Spanish religious
KRLE	89.7 FM	Carbon Hill	Educational Media Foundation	Contemporary Christian (K-Love)
WAAO-FM	93.7 FM	Andalusia	Three Notch Communications, LLC	Country
WAAX	570 AM	Gadsden	iHM Licenses, LLC	News/Talk
WABD	97.5 FM	Mobile	Cumulus Licensing LLC	Top 40 (CHR)
WABF	1480 AM	Mobile	Eternity Media Group WABF	Oldies/Adult standards
WACQ	580 AM	Tuskegee	Tiger Communications, Inc.	Classic hits
WACT	1420 AM	Tuscaloosa	iHM Licenses, LLC	Adult contemporary
WACV	93.1 FM	Coosada	Liberty Acquisitions 825, LLC	News/Talk
WAFN	1310 AM	Priceville	Fun Media Group of North Alabama, LLC	Classic hits
WAFN-FM	92.7 FM	Arab	Fun Media Group, Inc.	Classic hits
WAGF-FM	101.3 FM	Dothan	Wilson Broadcasting Co., Inc.	R&B, Motown oldies, blues, gospel music, and sports
WAGG	610 AM	Birmingham	SM-WAGG, LLC	Urban gospel
WAGH	101.3 FM	Smiths	iHM Licenses, LLC	Urban adult contemporary
WAHR	99.1 FM	Huntsville	Southern Stone Communications, LLC	Adult contemporary
WAJF-LP	107.9 FM	Decatur	Taxpayers Defense Fund	Variety
WAJH	91.1 FM	Birmingham	The Jazz Hall of Fame of Alabama, Inc.	Jazz
WAKD	89.9 FM	Sheffield	American Family Association	Religious talk (AFR)
WALJ	105.1 FM	Northport	Townsquare License, LLC	Urban contemporary
WALN	89.3 FM	Carrollton	American Family Association	Inspirational (AFR)
WALQ	1130 AM	Carrville	Autaugaville Radio, Inc.	Regional Mexican
WALW-LP	97.9 FM	Moulton	Community Information And Education Radio, Inc.	Classic hits
WALX	100.9 FM	Orrville	Scott Communications, Inc.	Classic hits
WAMI-FM	102.3 FM	Opp	Covington Media LLC	Classic country
WANI	1400 AM	Opelika	Auburn Network, Inc.	News/Talk
WAPC	880 AM	Opp	Christopher W. Johnson	Silent
WAPI	1070 AM	Birmingham	Radio License Holding CBC, LLC	Silent
WAPR	88.3 FM	Selma	Ua-Asu-Tsu Educational Radio Corp.	Public radio
WARB	700 AM	Dothan	Good Guys Broadcasting, LLC	Urban contemporary
WAQU	91.1 FM	Selma	American Family Association	Religious talk (AFR)
WASG	540 AM	Daphne	Alabama Radio Corporation	Urban gospel
WATV	900 AM	Birmingham	Courtney French Broadcasting, LLC	Urban contemporary
WAUD	1230 AM	Auburn	Tiger Communications, Inc.	News/Talk/Sports (CBS)
WAUE	100.3 FM	Waverly	Marble City Media, LLC	Adult contemporary
WAUF-LP	97.3 FM	Auburn	Core Radio Ministry, Inc.	Contemporary Christian
WAVH	106.5 FM	Daphne	Bigler Broadcasting, LLC	Talk
WAVU	630 AM	Albertville	Sand Mountain Broadcasting Service, Inc.	Contemporary Christian
WAXU	91.1 FM	Troy	American Family Association	Religious talk (AFR)
WAYE	1220 AM	Birmingham	Rivera Communications, LLC	Regional Mexican
WAYH	88.1 FM	Harvest	Hope Media Group	Contemporary Christian
WAYU	91.1 FM	Steele	Hope Media Group	Contemporary Christian
WBAM-FM	98.9 FM	Montgomery	Bluewater Broadcasting Company LLC	Country
WBFA	98.3 FM	Fort Mitchell	RCG Media, LLC	Urban contemporary
WBFR	89.5 FM	Birmingham	Family Stations, Inc.	Religious (Family Radio)
WBFZ	105.3 FM	Selma	Imani Communications Corporation, Inc	Urban contemporary, Gospel
WBHJ	95.7 FM	Midfield	SM-WBHJ, LLC	Mainstream urban/Rhythmic contemporary
WBHK	98.7 FM	Warrior	SM-WBHK, LLC	Urban adult contemporary
WBHM	90.3 FM	Birmingham	BD of Trustees/U of AL at Birmingham	Public radio; News Talk Information
WBHP	1230 AM	Huntsville	iHM Licenses, LLC	Talk
WBHY	840 AM	Mobile	Goforth Media, Inc.	Christian Talk
WBHY-FM	88.5 FM	Mobile	Goforth Media, Inc.	Contemporary Christian
WBIB	1110 AM	Centreville	James Deloach	Southern gospel
WBLX-FM	92.9 FM	Mobile	Cumulus Licensing LLC	Mainstream urban
WBMH	106.1 FM	Grove Hill	Pine City Radio, LLC	Classic country
WBNB	91.3 FM	Equality	The Power Foundation	Southern gospel (The Life FM)
WBPT	106.9 FM	Homewood	SM-WBPT, LLC	Classic rock
WBSA	1300 AM	Boaz	Watkins Broadcasting, Inc.	Christian/Southern gospel
WBTG	1290 AM	Sheffield	Slatton & Associates Broadcasters, Inc.	Adult standards
WBTG-FM	106.3 FM	Sheffield	Slatton & Associates Broadcasters, Inc.	Southern gospel
WBXR	1140 AM	Hazel Green	New England Communications, Inc.	Christian talk
WBZR-FM	105.9 FM	Atmore	Tri-County Broadcasting Inc.	Country
WCJL	89.1 FM	Margaret	Elijah Radio	Religious
WCKA	810 AM	Jacksonville	Alabama 810, LLC	Classic country
WCKF	100.7 FM	Ashland	WCKF, L.L.C.	Country
WCKS	102.7 FM	Fruithurst	WCKS, LLC	Top 40 (CHR)
WCOC-LP	103.5 FM	Jacksonville	The Jacksonville Church of Christ	Gospel Broadcasting Network (GBN) programming
WCRL	1570 AM	Oneonta	Our Town Radio, Inc.	Classic hits
WCSN-FM	105.7 FM	Orange Beach	Gulf Coast Broadcasting Co. Inc.	Classic hits
WDBT	103.9 FM	Fort Rucker	Gulf South Communications, Inc.	News/Talk
WDIG	1450 AM	Dothan	Larry Williams	Oldies
WDJC-FM	93.7 FM	Birmingham	Kimtron, Inc.	Contemporary Christian
WDJL	1000 AM	Huntsville	Gospel Explosion Ministries, LLC	Urban contemporary
WDJR	96.9 FM	Hartford	Gulf South Communications, Inc.	Classic country
WDLG	90.1 FM	Grove Hill	La Promesa Foundation	Catholic
WDLT-FM	104.1 FM	Saraland	Cumulus Licensing LLC	Urban AC/Southern Blues
WDNG	1450 AM	Anniston	Lake Broadcasting, Inc.	Classic hits
WDRM	102.1 FM	Decatur	iHM Licenses, LLC	Country
WDSA	1320 AM	Dothan	Wilson Broadcasting Co., Inc.	Urban talk
WDWZ	89.3 FM	Andalusia	B. Jordan Communications Corporation	News/Talk
WDXB	102.5 FM	Pelham	iHM Licenses, LLC	Country
WDXX	100.1 FM	Selma	Broadsouth Communications, Inc.	Country
WDYF	90.3 FM	Dothan	Faith Broadcasting, Inc	Christian
WEBJ	1240 AM	Brewton	Brewton Broadcasting, Inc.	News/Talk
WEBT	91.5 FM	Langdale	Langdale Educational Broadcasting Foundation	Christian
WECB	105.3 FM	Headland	Alabama Media, LLC	Country
WEGL	91.1 FM	Auburn	Board of Trustees Auburn University	Variety
WEIS	990 AM	Centre	Baker Enterprises, Inc.	Country/Southern gospel
WELL-FM	88.7 FM	Waverly	Alabama Christian Radio, Inc.	Contemporary Christian
WELR-FM	102.3 FM	Roanoke	Eagle's Nest, Inc.	Country
WENN	1320 AM	Birmingham	SM-WENN, LLC	Classic hits
WERC	960 AM	Birmingham	iHM Licenses, LLC	News/Talk
WERC-FM	105.5 FM	Hoover	iHM Licenses, LLC	News/Talk
WERM	1220 AM	Fairhope	Eternity Media Group WERM, LLC	Urban gospel
WESZ-LP	98.7 FM	Abbeville	Abbeville Broadcasting, Inc.	Oldies
WEUP	1700 AM	Huntsville	Hundley Batts, Sr. & Virginia Caples	Urban contemporary gospel and urban adult contemporary
WEUP-FM	103.1 FM	Moulton	Hundley Batts, Sr. & Virginia Caples	Urban contemporary
WEUV	1190 AM	Moulton	Hundley Batts, Sr. & Virginia Caples	Urban contemporary gospel and urban adult contemporary
WFAZ	90.9 FM	Goodwater	RadioAlabama Foundation	Classic Country
WFEB	1340 AM	Sylacauga	Lake Broadcasting, Inc.	Classic rock
WFFN	95.3 FM	Coaling	Townsquare License, LLC	Country
WFHK	1430 AM	Pell City	Stocks Broadcasting, Inc.	Adult contemporary
WFIX	91.3 FM	Florence	Tri-State Inspirational Broadcasting	Contemporary Christian
WFMA	102.9 FM	Marion	Educational Media Foundation	Contemporary Worship (Air1)
WFMH	1340 AM	Cullman	Jimmy Dale Media, LLC	Sports (WMCJ)
WFMH-FM	95.5 FM	Hackleburg	T & T Communications Inc	Country
WFPA	1400 AM	Fort Payne	J. Michael Wallace, dba Wallace Broadcasting Company	News/Talk
WFPW	91.1 FM	Battens Crossroads	T.P. Arrington Educational Foundation, Inc.	Contemporary Christian
WFTP-LP	103.9 FM	Fort Payne	Fort Payne Church of Christ	Gospel Broadcasting Network (GBN) programming
WFXO	1050 AM	Alexander City	Marble City Media, LLC	Classic country (WYFA)
WFXX	107.7 FM	Georgiana	Fox Broadcasting Corporation, LLC	Adult contemporary
WFYN-LP	93.3 FM	Birmingham	The Church In Birmingham Corporation	Religious Teaching
WFZX	1490 AM	Anniston	The Jeff Beck Broadcasting Group, LLC	Urban contemporary
WGAD	930 AM	Rainbow City	The Jeff Beck Broadcasting Group, LLC	Oldies
WGIB	91.9 FM	Birmingham	Glen Iris Baptist School	Religious
WGMP	1170 AM	Montgomery	Bluewater Broadcasting Company LLC	Alternative rock
WGMZ	93.1 FM	Glencoe	iHM Licenses, LLC	Classic hits
WGOK	900 AM	Mobile	Cumulus Licensing LLC	Gospel
WGOL	920 AM	Russellville	Pilati Investments Corp.	Classic country
WGRW	90.7 FM	Anniston	Word Works, Inc.	Contemporary Christian
WGSV	1270 AM	Guntersville	Guntersville Broadcasting Company, Inc.	News/Talk
WGSY	100.1 FM	Phenix City	iHM Licenses, LLC	Adult contemporary
WGTF	89.5 FM	Dothan	Bible Broadcasting Network, Inc.	Conservative religious (Bible Broadcasting Network)
WGYJ-LP	93.5 FM	Atmore	Outpouring Revival Church And Fellowship, Inc.	Religious Teaching
WGYV	1380 AM	Greenville	Robert John Williamson	Talk
WGZZ	94.3 FM	Waverly	Auburn Network, Inc.	Classic hits
WHBB	1490 AM	Selma	Broadsouth Communications, Inc.	News/Talk/Gospel
WHEP	1310 AM	Foley	Stewart Broadcasting Company, Inc.	News/Talk
WHHY-FM	101.9 FM	Montgomery	Cumulus Licensing LLC	Top 40 (CHR)
WHIL	91.3 FM	Mobile	The Board of Trustees of the University of Alabama	Public radio
WHIY	1600 AM	Huntsville	Hundley Batts, Sr. & Virginia Caples	Urban oldies and Blues
WHLW	104.3 FM	Luverne	iHM Licenses, LLC	Urban contemporary gospel
WHMA	1390 AM	Anniston	Williams Communications, Inc.	Gospel
WHMA-FM	95.3 FM	Alexandria	Williams Communications, Inc.	Country
WHOD	94.5 FM	Jackson	Pine City Radio, LLC	Adult hits
WHOG	1120 AM	Hobson City	Hobson City Broadcasting Co	Soul/R&B
WHOS	800 AM	Decatur	iHM Licenses, LLC	News/Talk
WHRP	94.1 FM	Gurley	Cumulus Licensing LLC	Urban adult contemporary
WHSL	107.7 FM	Lisman	Augustus Foundation Inc.	Silent
WHTY	1460 AM	Phenix City–Columbus	iHM Licenses, LLC	Black-oriented news
WHVK	103.5 FM	New Hope	Educational Media Foundation	Contemporary Christian (K-Love)
WIEZ	1490 AM	Decatur	MKRADIO1, LLC	Dance
WIJD	1270 AM	Prichard	Mobile Bay Corporation	Christian talk
WILF	88.9 FM	Monroeville	The Power Foundation	Southern gospel (The Life FM)
WINL	98.5 FM	Linden	Westburg Broadcasting Alabama, LLC	Country
WIXI	1360 AM	Jasper	Richardson Broadcasting Corporation	Rhythmic oldies, Blues, Gospel, and Talk
WIZB	94.3 FM	Abbeville	Radio Training Network, Inc.	Contemporary Christian
WJAB	90.9 FM	Huntsville	Alabama A & M University	Jazz/Blues
WJAM	1340 AM	Selma	Scott Communications, Inc.	Urban adult contemporary
WJBE-FM	88.5 FM	Five Points	Big South Community Broadcasting Inc.	Classic country
WJCK	88.3 FM	Piedmont	Immanuel Broadcasting Network, Inc.	Contemporary Christian
WJDB-FM	95.5 FM	Thomasville	Griffin Broadcasting Corporation	Country
WJEC	106.5 FM	Vernon	Lamar County Broadcasting Co., Inc.	Southern gospel
WJGR-LP	97.1 FM	Mobile	University of South Alabama	Variety
WJHF-LP	106.9 FM	Florence	Jackson Heights Church of Christ	Gospel Broadcasting Network (GBN) programming
WJHO	89.7 FM	Alexander City	RadioAlabama, Inc.	Contemporary Christian
WJIA	88.5 FM	Guntersville	Lake City Broadcasting Inc.	Contemporary Christian
WJIF	91.9 FM	Opp	Opp Educational Broadcasting Foundation	Religious
WJIK	89.3 FM	Fulton	Family Worship Center Church, Inc.	Christian
WJJL	90.7 FM	Carbon Hill	Elijah Radio, Inc.	Religious
WJJN	92.1 FM	Columbia	Wilson Broadcasting Co., Inc.	Hip Hop
WJLD	1400 AM	Fairfield	Richardson Broadcasting Corporation	Urban oldies/Blues
WJLX	1240 AM	Jasper	James D. Earley	Oldies
WJNZ	1000 AM	Robertsdale	Tri City Radio, LLC	Talk
WJOU	90.1 FM	Huntsville	Oakwood University	Christian music
WJOX	690 AM	Birmingham	Radio License Holding CBC, LLC	Sports (ISN/FSR)
WJOX-FM	94.5 FM	Birmingham	Radio License Holding CBC, LLC	Sports (ISN)
WJQX	100.5 FM	Helena	Radio License Holding CBC, LLC	Sports (ESPN)
WJRD	1150 AM	Tuscaloosa	JRD, Inc.	Oldies
WJRL-FM	100.5 FM	Slocomb	Alabama Media, LLC	Active rock
WJTW	1480 AM	Bridgeport	Bridgeport, Inc.	Classic hits
WJUS	1310 AM	Marion	Grace Baptist Temple Church	Urban gospel
WJUV	88.3 FM	Cullman	La Promesa Foundation	Catholic
WJWZ	97.9 FM	Wetumpka	Autaugaville Radio, Inc.	Urban contemporary
WJXI-LP	96.3 FM	Jacksonville	Calhoun County 9-1-1 District	Emergency Info
WKAC	1080 AM	Athens	Limestone Broadcasting Company, Inc.	Classic hits, Talk
WKAX	1500 AM	Russellville	Knox Media Group	Urban Gospel
WKCG-LP	99.1 FM	Dothan	The Ordinary People Society	Urban Gospel
WKEA-FM	98.3 FM	Scottsboro	Southern Torch, Inc.	Country
WKEM-LP	98.5 FM	Montgomery	Equality Broadcasting Network	Classic R&B
WKGA	97.5 FM	Goodwater	Lake Broadcasting, Inc.	Country
WKKR	97.7 FM	Auburn	iHM Licenses, LLC	Country
WKLF	1000 AM	Clanton	WKLF LLC	Southern gospel
WKLS	105.9 FM	Southside	Williams Communications, Inc.	Mainstream rock
WKLV-FM	93.5 FM	Butler	Educational Media Foundation	Contemporary Christian (K-Love)
WKMX	106.7 FM	Enterprise	Gulf South Communications, Inc.	Top 40 (CHR)
WKNG-FM	89.1 FM	Heflin	Covenant Communications, Inc.	Contemporary Christian
WKNU	106.3 FM	Brewton	Ellington Radio, Inc.	Country
WKRE	88.1 FM	Argo	Elijah Radio, Inc.	Religious
WKSJ-FM	94.9 FM	Mobile	iHM Licenses, LLC	Country
WKUA	88.5 FM	Moundville	TBTA Ministries	Christian rock/Rap
WKUL	92.1 FM	Cullman	Jonathan Christian Corp.	Country/Talk/Sports
WKWL	1230 AM	Florala	Florala Broadcasting Co., Inc.	Classic pop
WKXK	96.7 FM	Pine Hill	Autaugaville Radio, Inc.	Urban contemporary (WKXN)
WKXM-FM	97.7 FM	Winfield	Ad-Media Management Corp.	Oldies
WKXN	95.7 FM	Fort Deposit	Autaugaville Radio, Inc.	Urban contemporary
WKXX	102.9 FM	Attalla	Broadcast Media LLC	Classic country
WKZJ	92.7 FM	Eufaula	Davis Broadcasting, Inc. of Columbus	Urban adult contemporary
WLAY	1450 AM	Muscle Shoals	Singing River Media Group, LLC	Oldies
WLAY-FM	100.1 FM	Littleville	Singing River Media Group, LLC	Classic country
WLBF	89.1 FM	Montgomery	Faith Broadcasting, Inc	Religious
WLDQ	102.5 FM	Dothan	Alabama Media, LLC	Classic hits
WLDX	990 AM	Fayette	Dean Broadcasting, Inc.	Classic hits
WLGQ	91.5 FM	Gadsden	Educational Media Foundation	Contemporary Christian (K-Love)
WLJR	88.5 FM	Birmingham	Briarwood Presbyterian Church	Religious
WLJS-FM	91.9 FM	Jacksonville	Board of Trustees, Jacksonville State University	Public/College radio
WLOR	1550 AM	Huntsville	Southern Stone Communications, LLC	Adult Contemporary
WLPR	960 AM	Prichard	Goforth Media, Inc.	Southern gospel
WLRH	89.3 FM	Huntsville	Alabama Educational Television Commission	Classical music/News
WLUG-LP	106.3 FM	Anniston	Center of Hope, Inc.	Contemporary Christian
WLVC-LP	93.3 FM	Birmingham	Love Commandment Ministries	Silent
WLVM	98.3 FM	Chickasaw	Educational Media Foundation	Contemporary Christian (K-Love)
WLWE	1360 AM	Roanoke	Eagle's Nest, Inc.	Sports (WLAG)
WLWI-FM	92.3 FM	Montgomery	Cumulus Licensing LLC	Country
WLXQ	99.1 FM	Greensboro	Educational Media Foundation	Contemporary Christian (K-Love)
WLXY-LP	96.9 FM	Chelsea	Chelsea Community Radio	Classic hits
WLYB	96.3 FM	Livingston	Blackbelt Broadcasting, Inc.	Adult contemporary
WMBV	91.9 FM	Dixons Mills	The Moody Bible Institute of Chicago	Religious
WMCJ	1460 AM	Cullman	Jimmy Dale Media, LLC	Sports (WFMH)
WMFC	99.3 FM	Monroeville	Monroe Broadcasting Company, Inc.	Oldies
WMFT	88.9 FM	Tuscaloosa	The Moody Bible Institute of Chicago	Religious
WMGJ	1240 AM	Gadsden	Floyd L. Donald Broadcasting Co. Inc	Urban contemporary
WMGY	800 AM	Montgomery	Terry L. Barber	Southern gospel
WMHZ	1340 AM	Holt	TTI, Inc	Classic rock
WMJB	95.3 FM	Valley	Augusta Radio Fellowship Institute, Inc.	Christian
WMJJ	96.5 FM	Birmingham	iHM Licenses, LLC	Adult contemporary
WMMA	1480 AM	Irondale	La Promesa Foundation	Catholic
WMRK-FM	107.9 FM	Shorter	Alexander Broadcasting Company, LLC	Contemporary Christian (K-Love)
WMSP	740 AM	Montgomery	Cumulus Licensing LLC	Sports (ISN)
WMXA	96.7 FM	Opelika	iHM Licenses, LLC	Hot adult contemporary
WMXB	1280 AM	Tuscaloosa	Lawson of Tuscaloosa, Inc.	Urban adult contemporary
WMXC	99.9 FM	Mobile	iHM Licenses, LLC	Hot adult contemporary
WMXN-FM	101.7 FM	Stevenson	Southern Torch, Inc.	Classic hits
WMXS	103.3 FM	Montgomery	Cumulus Licensing LLC	Adult contemporary
WNGL	1410 AM	Mobile	Archangel Communications, Inc.	Catholic
WNRA-LP	94.5 FM	Hank Pride	Northern Alabama Historical Foundation	Country
WNSP	105.5 FM	Bay Minette	Dot Com Plus, LLC	Sports (SM/ESPN)
WNTM	710 AM	Mobile	iHM Licenses, LLC	Talk
WNWF	1470 AM	Evergreen	Andala Enterprises, Inc.	News/Talk
WOAB	104.9 FM	Ozark	Autaugaville Radio, Inc.	Regional Mexican
WOOF	560 AM	Dothan	WOOF, Inc.	Sports (FSR)
WOOF-FM	99.7 FM	Dothan	WOOF, Inc.	Adult contemporary
WOPP	1290 AM	Opp	E & R Broadcasting, Inc.	Country/Oldies/Southern gospel
WOWB	90.9 FM	Brewton	Agape Educational Media, Inc.	Contemporary Christian
WOXI-LP	95.9 FM	Oxford	Calhoun County 9-1-1 District	Emergency Info
WOZK	900 AM	Ozark	Autaugaville Radio, Inc.	Urban adult contemporary (WZKD)
WPHH	93.5 FM	Hope Hull	Radio Training Network, Inc.	Contemporary Christian
WPIL	91.7 FM	Heflin	Down the Hill Communications	Southern gospel/Classic country/Bluegrass
WPJB-LP	93.3 FM	Selma	People for Jesus Radio Broadcasting Company	Contemporary Christian
WPJN	89.3 FM	Jemison	C W Johnson Education Foundation Inc.	Contemporary Christian
WPLX-LP	93.3 FM	Pelham	North Shelby Community Radio	Classic hits
WPMR-LP	95.7 FM	Russellville	Provision Ministry	Southern gospel
WPPG	101.1 FM	Repton	Wolff Broadcasting Corporation	Country
WKVV	97.3 FM	Gardendale	Educational Media Foundation	Contemporary Christian
WQAH-FM	105.7 FM	Addison	Abercrombie Broadcasting FM, Inc.	Country/Bluegrass
WQCR	1500 AM	Alabaster	Rivera Communications, LLC	Spanish Adult hits
WQEM	101.5 FM	Columbiana	Glen Iris Baptist School	Religious
WQEN	103.7 FM	Trussville	iHM Licenses, LLC	Top 40 (CHR)
WQJJ-LP	101.9 FM	Jasper	North Alabama Public Service Broadcasters	Classic hits
WQKS-FM	96.1 FM	Montgomery	Bluewater Broadcasting Company, LLC	Adult contemporary
WQLT-FM	107.3 FM	Florence	Big River Broadcasting Corporation	Adult hits
WQNR	99.9 FM	Tallassee	Tiger Communications, Inc.	Adult hits
WQOH-FM	88.7 FM	Springville	La Promesa Foundation	Catholic
WQPR	88.7 FM	Muscle Shoals	University of Alabama	Public radio
WQRR	101.7 FM	Reform	Townsquare License, LLC	Contemporary Christian
WQRV	100.3 FM	Meridianville	iHM Licenses, LLC	Classic hits
WQRX	870 AM	Valley Head	Joy Christian Ministries	Silent
WQSB	105.1 FM	Albertville	Sand Mountain Broadcasting Service, Inc.	Country
WQSI	93.9 FM	Union Springs	Tiger Communications, Inc.	News/Talk
WQUA	102.1 FM	Citronelle	Family Worship Center Church, Inc.	Religious
WQZX	94.3 FM	Greenville	Haynes Broadcasting, Inc.	Country
WQZZ	107.3 FM	Boligee	Mildred R. Porter	Urban contemporary
WRAB	1380 AM	Arab	Fun Media Group of Alabama LLC	Classic country
WRBZ	1250 AM	Wetumpka	TBE, LLC	Spanish
WRFS	105.1 FM	Rockford	Marble City Media, LLC	Classic hits
WRHP	100.1 FM	Anniston	Anniston Seventh-Day Adventist Church	Christian talk
WRJL-FM	99.9 FM	Eva	Rojo, Inc.	Southern gospel
WRJM-LP	95.5 FM	Cullman	Cullman Community Radio, Inc.	Variety
WRKH	96.1 FM	Mobile	iHM Licenses, LLC	Classic rock
WRMG	1430 AM	Red Bay	Jack W. Ivy, Sr.	Classic country
WRNF	89.5 FM	Selma	The Moody Bible Institute of Chicago	Religious
WRNK-LP	96.3 FM	Lanett	Contact Ministry Center	Religious Teaching
WRSA-FM	96.9 FM	Holly Pond	NCA, Inc.	Adult contemporary
WRTR	105.9 FM	Brookwood	iHM Licenses, LLC	News/Talk
WRTT-FM	95.1 FM	Huntsville	Southern Stone Communications, LLC	Active rock
WRWA	88.7 FM	Dothan	Troy University	Public Radio; News/Talk/Classical
WRYC	92.5 FM	Frisco City	Blackbelt Broadcasting, Inc.	Country
WRYD	97.7 FM	Jemison	TBTA Ministries	Religious
WSBM	1340 AM	Florence	Big River Broadcasting Corporation	Sports (FSR)
WSGN	98.3 FM	Stewartville	Marble City Media, LLC	Oldies
WSHF	92.7 FM	Haleyville	AMS Radio LLC	Adult contemporary
WSJA	91.3 FM	York	Augusta Radio Fellowship Institute, Inc.	Christian (Good News Network)
WSJL	88.1 FM	Bessemer	Elijah Radio, Inc.	Christian talk
WSMX-FM	100.3 FM	Goshen	J&W Communications LLC	Classic country/Classic hits
WSTF	91.5 FM	Andalusia	Faith Broadcasting, Inc.	Religious
WSTH-FM	106.1 FM	Alexander City	iHM Licenses, LLC	Country
WSYP-LP	95.1 FM	Birmingham	Sankofa Youth Development Program Inc	Variety
WTAK-FM	106.1 FM	Hartselle	iHM Licenses, LLC	Classic rock
WTAZ	1580 AM	Oxford	Woodard Broadcasting Co., Inc.	Oldies
WTBB	89.9 FM	Gadsden	Trinity Christian Academy	Christian (WTBJ)
WTBC	1230 AM	Tuscaloosa	Townsquare License, LLC	Sports
WTBF	970 AM	Troy	Troy Broadcasting Corp.	Sports (ISN)
WTBF-FM	94.7 FM	Brundidge	Troy Broadcasting Corporation	Talk/Personality/Oldies
WTBJ	91.3 FM	Oxford	Trinity Christian Academy	Christian
WTDR	1350 AM	Gadsden	Rainbow City Media, LLC	Country
WTDR-FM	92.7 FM	Talladega	The Jeff Beck Broadcasting Group, LLC	Country/Classic country
WTGZ	95.9 FM	Tuskegee	Tiger Communications Inc.	Alternative rock
WTKI	1450 AM	Huntsville	Southern Broadcasting, LLC	Soft adult contemporary
WTLM	1520 AM	Opelika	iHM Licenses, LLC	Urban gospel
WTLS	1300 AM	Tallassee	Michael Butler Broadcasting, LLC	Talk/Sports/Classic Hits
WTOF	1110 AM	Bay Minette	UM Enterprise, LLC	Christian
WTSK	790 AM	Tuscaloosa	Townsquare License, LLC	Gospel
WTSU	89.9 FM	Troy	Troy University	Public radio; Classical
WTUG-FM	92.9 FM	Northport	Townsquare License, LLC	Urban adult contemporary
WTUS-LP	103.3 FM	Tuscaloosa	Tuscaloosa City Board of Education	Travelers Info/Smooth jazz
WTVY-FM	95.5 FM	Dothan	Gulf South Communications, Inc.	Country
WTWX-FM	95.9 FM	Guntersville	Guntersville Broadcasting Company, Inc.	Country/Talk
WTXK	1210 AM	Pike Road	Frontdoor Broadcasting, L.L.C.	Sports (ESPN)
WTXT	98.1 FM	Fayette	iHM Licenses, LLC	Country
WUAL-FM	91.5 FM	Tuscaloosa	University of Alabama	Public radio
WUBZ-LP	100.7 FM	Tuskegee	City of Tuskegee	Urban gospel
WUHT	107.7 FM	Birmingham	Radio License Holding CBC, LLC	Hot urban adult contemporary
WUMO-LP	94.5 FM	Montgomery	Aframsouth	Urban Gospel/Jazz
WUMP	730 AM	Madison	Cumulus Licensing LLC	Sports (ISN)
WURL	760 AM	Moody	Donald Jennings Evangelistic Association	Southern gospel
WURY-LP	97.1 FM	Phenix City	Talkfaith Radio	Religious (3ABN)
WVAS	90.7 FM	Montgomery	Alabama State University (ASU)	Jazz
WVBC-LP	96.9 FM	Bessemer	Bessemer City Schools	Variety
WVFG	107.5 FM	Uniontown	Charles E. Jones, Jr.	Urban/Oldies/Gospel
WVMB-LP	107.9 FM	Madison	Madison Baptist Church, Inc.	Religious Teaching
WVNA	1590 AM	Tuscumbia	Singing River Media Group, LLC	Mainstream rock
WVNA-FM	105.5 FM	Muscle Shoals	Singing River Media Group, LLC	Mainstream rock
WVNN	770 AM	Athens	Cumulus Licensing LLC	News/Talk
WVNN-FM	92.5 FM	Trinity	Cumulus Licensing LLC	News/Talk
WVOB	91.3 FM	Dothan	Bethany Divinity College And Seminary, Inc.	Southern gospel
WVOK-FM	97.9 FM	Oxford	Woodard Broadcasting Co., Inc.	Hot adult contemporary
WVRV	97.5 FM	Pine Level	Back Door Broadcasting, LLC	Contemporary Christian
WVSA	1380 AM	Vernon	Lamar County Broadcasting Company, Inc.	Gospel
WVSM	1500 AM	Rainsville	Sand Mountain Advertising Co., Inc.	Southern gospel/Contemporary Christian
WVUA-FM	90.7 FM	Tuscaloosa	Board of Trustees, University of Alabama	Adult album alternative
WWFA	102.7 FM	St. Florian	Southern Broadcasting LLC	Top 40 (CHR)
WWFF-FM	93.3 FM	New Market	Cumulus Licensing LLC	Country
WWGC	1090 AM	Albertville	Quality Properties, LLC	Spanish
WWIC	1050 AM	Scottsboro	Scottsboro Broadcasting Co., Inc.	Classic country
WWMG	97.1 FM	Millbrook	iHM Licenses, LLC	Urban adult contemporary
WWPG	104.3 FM	Eutaw	Jim Lawson Communications, Inc.	Urban adult contemporary
WWTM	1390 AM	Decatur	Brantley Broadcast Associates, LLC	Christian Talk
WXFL	96.1 FM	Florence	Big River Broadcasting Corporation	Country
WXFX	95.1 FM	Prattville	Cumulus Licensing LLC	Mainstream rock
WXJC	850 AM	Birmingham	Kimtron, Inc.	Southern gospel/Talk
WXJC-FM	101.1 FM	Cullman	Kimtron, Inc.	Southern gospel/Talk
WXKD	920 AM	Brantley	Autaugaville Radio, Inc.	Urban adult Contemporary (WZKD)
WXQW	660 AM	Fairhope	Cumulus Licensing LLC	Talk
WXVI	1600 AM	Montgomery	New Life Ministries, Inc.	Gospel
WYAM	890 AM	Hartselle	Decatur Communications Properties, LLC	Spanish variety
WYDE	1260 AM	Birmingham	Kimtron, Inc.	Silent
WYDE-FM	92.5 FM	Cordova	Kimtron, Inc.	Silent
WYEA	1290 AM	Sylacauga	Marble City Media, LLC	Classic country (WFXO)
WYFD	91.7 FM	Decatur	Bible Broadcasting Network, Inc.	Conservative religious (Bible Broadcasting Network)
WYFR-LP	89.9 FM	Fairhope	Fairhope Radio	Religious Teaching
WYLS	104.9 FM	York	Grantell Broadcasting, LLC	Sports
WYTK	93.9 FM	Rogersville	Valley Broadcasting, Inc.	Sports (ESPN/CBS)
WYVC	102.3 FM	Camden	Down Home Broadcasting	Urban gospel
WYZK-LP	98.3 FM	Hartselle	Association for Social Justice in Morgan County	Variety
WZAL-LP	99.9 FM	Alabaster	Alabaster Broadcasting and Community Radio	Classic Country
WZBQ	94.1 FM	Carrollton	iHM Licenses, LLC	Top 40 (CHR)
WZDK-LP	98.5 FM	Decatur	North Alabama Youth Sports Association	Bluegrass
WZEV	90.5 FM	Lineville	B. Jordan Communications Corporation	Oldies
WZEW	92.1 FM	Fairhope	.COM+, L.L.C.	Adult album alternative
WZGX	1450 AM	Bessemer	Autaugaville Radio, Inc.	Regional Mexican
WZHT	105.7 FM	Troy	iHM Licenses, LLC	Mainstream urban
WZKD	950 AM	Montgomery	Autaugaville Radio, Inc.	Urban adult contemporary
WZMG	910 AM	Pepperell	iHM Licenses, LLC	Sports (WPCH)
WZNJ	106.5 FM	Demopolis	Westburg Broadcasting Alabama, LLC	Urban contemporary/Urban oldies
WZOB	1250 AM	Fort Payne	Central Broadcasting Company, Inc.	Country
WZRR	99.5 FM	Birmingham	Radio License Holding CBC, LLC	News/Talk
WZTZ	101.1 FM	Elba	Boll Weevil Communications, LLC	Sports (WOOF)
WZYP	104.3 FM	Athens	Cumulus Licensing LLC	Top 40 (CHR)
WZZA	1410 AM	Tuscumbia	Muscle Shoals Broadcasting, Inc.	Urban adult contemporary
WZZK-FM	104.7 FM	Birmingham	SM-WZZK, LLC	Country
WZZN	97.7 FM	Union Grove	Neighbors Broadcast Company, LLC	Sports (ESPN)

== Defunct ==
- WAAO
- WACD
- WACM-LP
- WAQG
- WARI
- WBCF
- WBRC-FM
- WBYE
- WCMA
- WCOC
- WCOX
- WDLK
- WELB
- WERH
- WERH-FM
- WFBH-LP
- WGEA
- WGH
- WGYJ
- WGYN
- WHMZ-LP
- WIQR
- WIRB
- WIZD-LP
- WJDB
- WJHX
- WJLQ-LP
- WJSD-LP
- WJSR
- WJWC-LP
- WKDG
- WKIJ
- WKOC-LP
- WKXM
- WKYD
- WLHQ
- WLVN
- WLWI
- WMFC
- WMOB
- WPID
- WPPT
- WPRN
- WQHC
- WQLS
- WQXD-LP
- WREN
- WRJX
- WRMZ-LP
- WSMX-LP
- WTID
- WTOH
- WTQX
- WTXQ
- WUAC-LP
- WULA
- WVPL
- WWFC-LP
- WWWH
- WXAL
- WXJC
- WYDK
- WYJD
- WYLS
- WYVC
- WZCT
- WZNN
- WZTN
- WZTQ
- WZZX

== See also ==
- Alabama media
  - List of newspapers in Alabama
  - List of television stations in Alabama
  - Media in cities in Alabama: Birmingham, Huntsville, Mobile, Montgomery, Tuscaloosa
- Alabama Broadcasters Association

== Bibliography ==
- Jack Alicoate, ed. (1939), "Alabama", Radio Annual, New York: Radio Daily, OCLC 2459636 – via Internet Archive
- Federal Writers' Project (1941), "Newspapers and Radio", Alabama; a Guide to the Deep South, American Guide Series, New York: Hastings House, pp. 110–115, hdl:2027/uc1.b4469723 – via HathiTrust
- Chas. A. Alicoate, ed. (1957), "Amplitude Modulation Stations - AM: Alabama", Radio Annual and Television Yearbook, New York: Radio Daily Corp., OCLC 10512206 – via Internet Archive
- "AM Stations in the U.S.: Alabama", Radio Annual Television Year Book, New York: Radio Television Daily, 1963, OCLC 10512375 – via Internet Archive

== Images ==
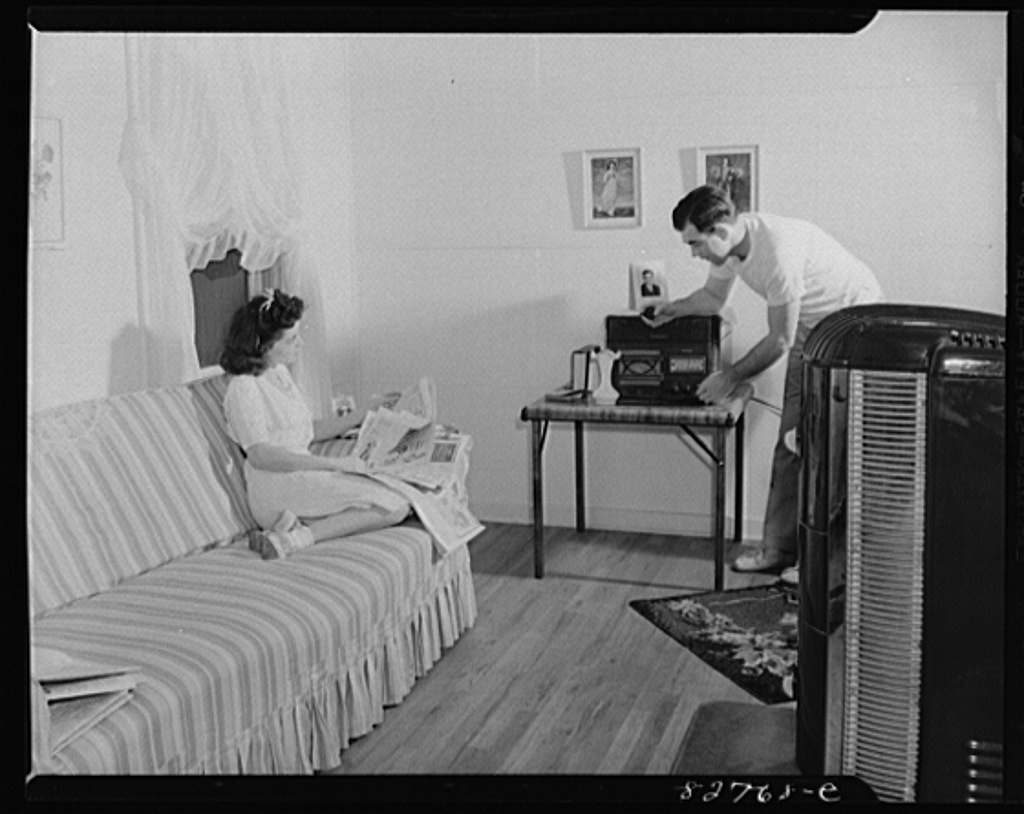
Radio listeners in Childersburg, Alabama, 1942

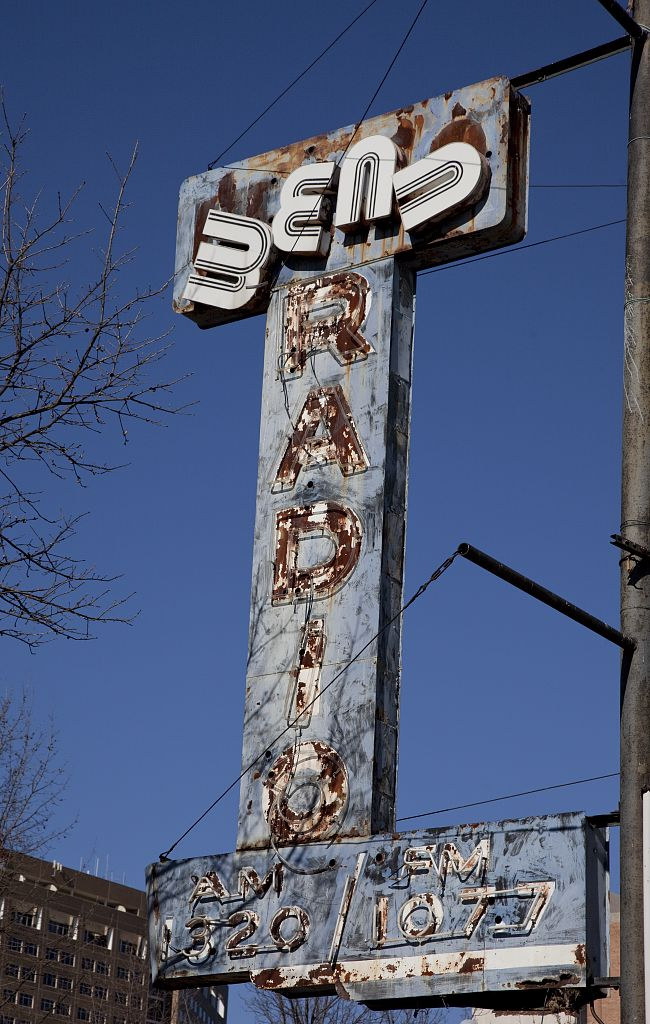
Signage for WENN radio station, Birmingham Alabama, 2010

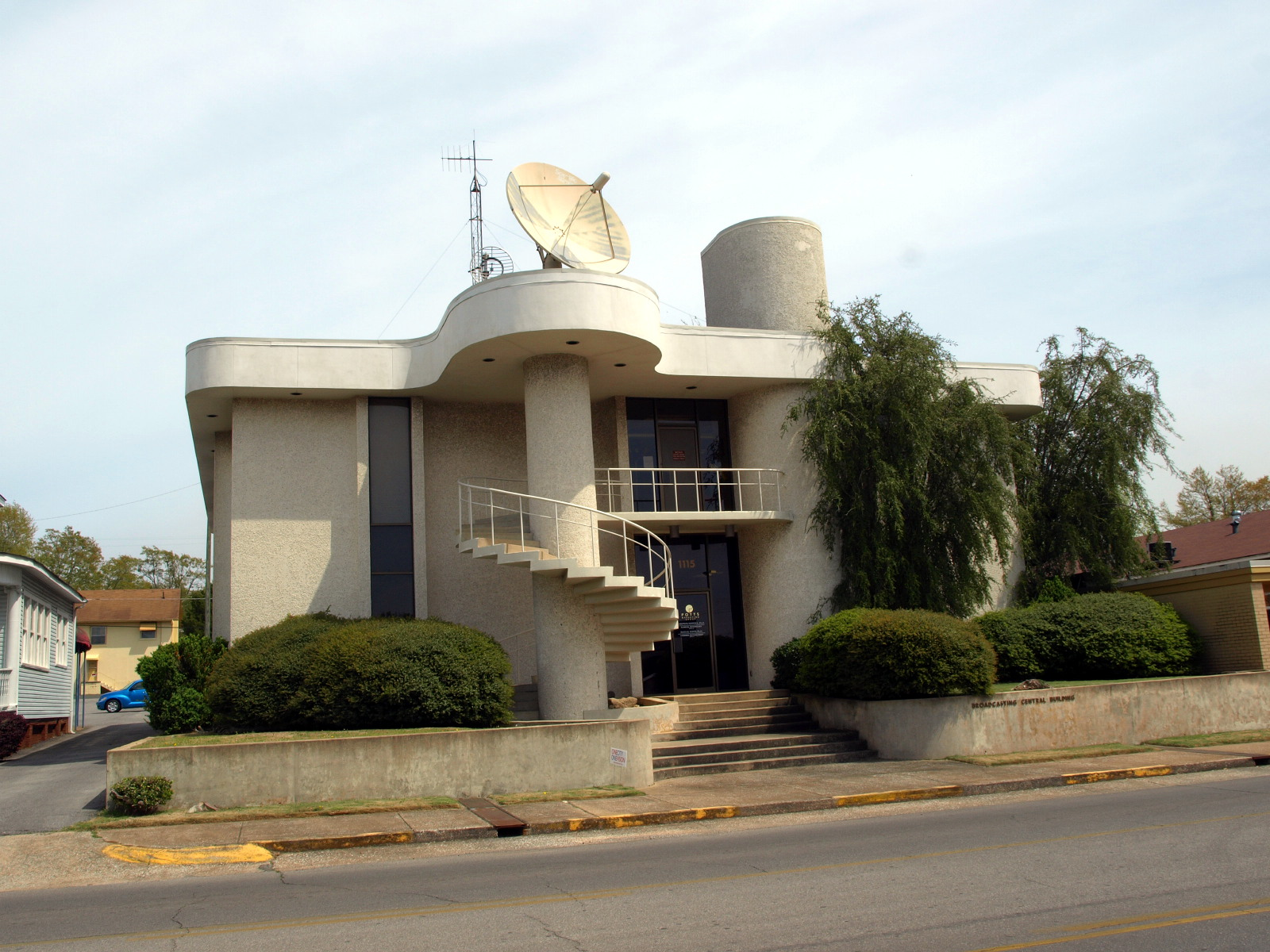
WDNG building in Anniston, Alabama, 2014
