= Anniston–Oxford metropolitan area =

Anniston–Oxford Metropolitan Area
- Metropolitan Statistical Area
- Anniston–Oxford, AL Metropolitan Statistical area
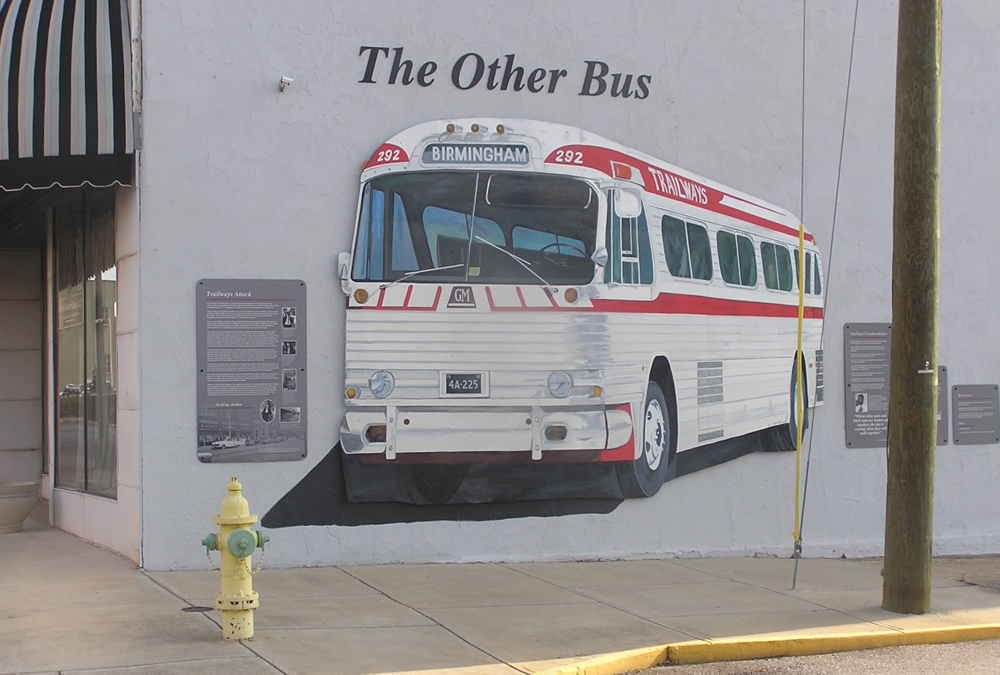
- Historic marker commemorating the Freedom Riders in downtown Anniston
Interactive Map of Anniston–Oxford, AL MSA
City of Anniston
City of Oxford
Anniston–Oxford, AL MSA
- Country: United States
- State: Alabama
- Largest city: Anniston
- Other cities: Oxford; Jacksonville

Area
  - Total: 612 sq mi (1,590 km^{2})
  - Water: 4 sq mi (10 km^{2})

Population (2000)
  - Total: 112,249
- Time zone: UTC-6 (CST)
  - Summer (DST): UTC-5 (CDT)

The Anniston–Oxford metropolitan statistical area is the second-most populated metropolitan area in Northeast Alabama, behind Huntsville. At the 2000 census, it had a population of 112,249. The MSA is anchored by significant jobs at Jacksonville State University, the Northeast Alabama Regional Medical Center, Stringfellow Hospital, the Anniston Army Depot, and the Department of Homeland Security at McClellan. McClellan has transitioned from being a closed military base, to becoming the home of hundreds of residents, new retail growth, and now more than 3,000 jobs spread out over more than 20 employers. Anniston remains strong in health care, legal, financial services and manufacturing. Oxford, with Interstate 20 running right through it, has developed a number of retail and restaurant establishments including the Oxford Exchange.

Jacksonville is an important city in the region due to its student population and education resources at Jacksonville State University. The other cities surrounding Anniston–Oxford are Piedmont, Ohatchee, Hobson City, and Weaver.

== Counties ==
Alabama

- Calhoun

== Core cities ==
- Anniston
- Oxford

=== Suburbs with more than 5,000 inhabitants ===
- Jacksonville
- Saks
- Choccolocco
- Piedmont

=== Suburbs with less than 5,000 inhabitants ===
- Alexandria
- Hobson City
- Nances Creek
- Ohatchee
- Weaver
- West End-Cobb Town
- White Plains

== Education ==
=== K-12 education ===
Public

- Anniston City Schools
- Calhoun County Schools
- Oxford City Schools
- Jacksonville City Schools
- Piedmont City Schools

Private

- The Donoho School
- Sacred Heart of Jesus Catholic School
- Jacksonville Christian Academy
- Trinity Christian Academy

Faith Christian School

=== Institutions of higher education ===
- Jacksonville State University
  - Main Jacksonville Campus
  - McClellan Campus
- Gadsden State Community College
  - Ayers Campus
  - McClellan Campus
- Gadsden Business College

== Transportation ==
=== Main roadways ===
Interstate 20 runs through the southern portion of the county, connecting Atlanta with Birmingham. It is four-lane controlled access. Construction to widen to six lanes from the Talladega Speedway to Golden Springs Road (also known as the Eastern Bypass) is complete as of 2015.

- Noble Street runs through downtown, lined with office buildings, specialty shops, and restaurants. A major revitalization effort in 2003 made this street more pedestrian friendly. The old four-lane thoroughfare was gutted, and turn of the 20th century trolley tracks were removed to help resurface the street. The road was converted to two lane traffic with wider sidewalks.
- Quintard Avenue (Alabama State Route 21) runs parallel two blocks east of Noble Street. It serves as the main north–south traffic corridor for Anniston. The road is six lanes from East P street to 19th Street, and then four lanes. It connects central Oxford to the south and Jacksonville, Gadsden, and the McClellan area of Anniston to the north. Traffic is relatively heavy on this road around downtown and in Oxford as well. Since the early 1990s, bypasses have been planned on both sides of town to alleviate traffic. The North end becomes McClellan Blvd and heads toward Jacksonville via AL 21.
- The Western Bypass (SR-202) is a completed project of the Alabama Department of Transportation. It runs from I-20 in Oxford (the Coldwater exit) and runs north into the present AL 202. It is five lanes wide (handling Anniston Army Depot traffic). Future plans will extend it on the present County road 109 by widening it to connect with US 431.
- The Veterans Memorial Parkway (US-431) is a recently completed project of the Alabama Department of Transportation to build a four-lane highway in Calhoun County. This project will alleviate the high traffic congestion present on Alabama State Route 21 while also opening up new commercial and industrial shipping routes within the region as Interstate 20 will be able to connect quickly with US 431 through a limited access fly-over. It is the largest influx of federal money into the local economy since Fort McClellan closed. More than $21 million has been earmarked for this project. (See Page 124 of Public Law 109-59-Aug. 10, 2005 as enacted by the US Congress).
- US 78 (known as Hamric Drive in central Oxford) handles a good bit of traffic as well. It runs parallel to Interstate 20 in Oxford.
- Pelham Road (Alabama State Route 21) runs through Jacksonville and is a main road for commercial and retail traffic as well as college students commuting to Jacksonville State University.

=== Air ===
The Anniston Metropolitan Airport is a general aviation facility, south of the city proper, in Oxford. Its single asphalt runway is 7,000 feet long and 150 feet wide. Birmingham International Airport in Birmingham is 57 miles west serving commercial flight, as well as Hartsfield-Jackson Atlanta International Airport (IATA: ATL, ICAO: KATL), the world's busiest airport as measured by passenger traffic and by aircraft traffic, provides air service between Atlanta many national and international destinations.

=== Train ===
Amtrak's Crescent train connects Anniston with the cities of New York, Philadelphia, Baltimore, Washington, Charlotte, Atlanta, Birmingham and New Orleans. The Amtrak station is situated at the Southern Railway Depot (which was built in 1926), located at 126 West 4th Street. The city purchased the station in 2001 for $430,000 from federal grants for the restoration, in hopes of turning the building into a multi modal transportation hub for the city. It will serve by Amtrak (train), Greyhound (bus), and local taxi and bus services if goes as planned.

=== Transit ===
Areawide Community Transportation System provides local bus service in Anniston and Oxford with four routes running on an hourly schedule from the Multimodal Station.

== Economy ==
The military has played the biggest part in the economy in Anniston since the turn of the 20th century. The Anniston Army Depot which is used for the maintenance of most Army tracked vehicles (the M-1 Abrhams tank) remains in use. The depot formerly housed a major chemical weapons storage facility but those weapons and the equipment to destroy them have been closed since 2013 and will never return.

Fort McClellan, formerly site of the U.S. Army Military Police Training Academy and Chemical Warfare training center, was de-commissioned in 1999. A commission of local city and county leaders known as the McClellan Development Authority manages the redevelopment of the old fort. McClellan has evolved to becoming a master-planned community complete with residential, retail, professional and industrial employers. Millions of dollars in continued access road improvements continue to come to McClellan. An industrial department completed with full infrastructure is present at McClellan and in December 2014 its largest employer International Automotive Components of Luxembourg announced a 350 job expansion at the park.

A portion of the former fort is now home to the Alabama National Guard Training Center. Another 9,000 acres (3,600 ha) of the fort were set aside for the Mountain Longleaf National Wildlife Refuge in 2003. The Department of Homeland Security also uses a portion of the decommissioned fort for training and fieldwork.

=== Top employers ===
- Anniston Army Depot
- Northeast Alabama Regional Medical Center
- Calhoun County School System
- Jacksonville State University
- Springs Industry
- Homeland Security
- BAE Systems
- New Flyer
- Alabama Power Company
- Federal-Mogul Corporation
- Kronospan

=== Other employers with ties to county commerce ===
- Honda Manufacturing of Alabama in Talladega County
- Talladega Speedway in Talladega County
- Goodyear Tire and Rubber Company in Gadsden, Alabama

== Media ==
=== Newspapers ===
- The Anniston Star - daily
- The Jacksonville News - weekly
- The Piedmont Journal - weekly
- The Oxford Independent - weekly
- The Chanticleer - weekly college

=== AM Radio ===
- WAAX 570 AM: News/Talk 570 WAAX
- WCKS 810 AM classic country
- WHMA 1390 AM gospel
- WDNG 1450 AM talk
- WFZX 1490 AM sports talk
- WTAZ 1580 AM oldies

=== FM Radio ===
- WJCK 88.3 FM religious
- WGRW 90.7 FM religious
- WTBJ 91.3 FM religious
- WLJS-FM 91.9 FM college/alternative/NPR
- WTDR-FM 92.7 FM (Talladega, broadcasts from Oxford) country
- WHMA-FM 95.5 FM country
- WVOK-FM 97.9 FM hot AC
- WGMZ-FM 93.1 FM Z93: Classic Hits

=== Television ===
- WEAC-CD TV24 (Ind.)

Anniston–Oxford is part of the Birmingham television market.

== Culture ==
Anniston long has served as a cultural center for northeastern Alabama. The Alabama Shakespeare Festival has its root here when it was founded in Anniston, back in 1972, before moving to Montgomery in 1985. Jacksonville State University holds many performances such as plays and operas throughout the year. The Knox Concert Series regularly brings world-renowned musical and dance productions to the area. Anniston is also home to the Anniston Museum of Natural History and the Berman Museum of World History. Other cultural notes is the Music at McClellan series, which is part of a project with the Alabama Symphony Orchestra at the former Fort McClellan, the perform outdoor concerts in the early summer.

The Anniston has many examples of Victorian-style homes, some of which have been restored or preserved. Many others have been destroyed or are in dilapidated conditions. Several of the city's churches are architecturally significant or historic, including the Church of St. Michael and All Angels, Grace Episcopal Church, and Parker Memorial Baptist Church. Temple Beth EL, dedicated in 1893, has the oldest building in the state continuously and currently being used for Jewish worship. The Coldwater cover bridge sits at Oxford Lake Park, it was saved from demolition back in the early 1990s.

After decades of decay, Noble Street, is seeing a rebirth as a downtown shopping and dining district in the heart of downtown. There are several large shopping centers in the area as well, such as the Quintard Mall and the Oxford Exchange, both located in Oxford.

The Anniston–Oxford area is home to many restaurants ranging from American, Italian, Greek, Cuban, Cajun, Mexican, Chinese, Japanese, Korean, and Southern cuisines. Many locally own dining establishments are located in the downtown Anniston, Buckner Circle, and around Jacksonville Square, as well as major chain restaurants along the interstate in Oxford.

Jacksonville is a center for the college activity in Northeast Alabama, as well as bar life. Brother's Bar, hosted Allman Bros. (unannounced) performances in the 1970s and is still a popular venue for local musicians. Many restaurant style bars are scattered around the square vicinity of Jacksonville. Jacksonville State has touring national acts on occasion.

=== Chemical contamination ===
The most significant news about the region came in a CBS 60 Minutes investigation that revealed Anniston to be among the most toxic cities in the country. The source of local contamination was a Monsanto chemical factory. The current lead-in on CBS' website states:

Imagine a place so saturated with toxic, cancer-causing chemicals that it's in the dirt people walk on, the air they breathe - even the blood that pumps through their veins. The 24,000 people living in Anniston, Ala., don't have to imagine this. Many of them are living it. In fact, they have been living it for decades - they just didn't know it. The company responsible didn't tell them, and neither did the Environmental Protection Agency.

Monsanto Corporation isn't the only source of chemicals in the area, though it is the only source of proven contamination. After the closure of Fort McClellan and the revelation of contamination, the federal government built an incinerator in Anniston to burn large stockpiles of chemical munitions including nerve gas and mustard gas. These chemical weapons were stored for decades by the US Army for potential use in warfare. Anniston is one of nine areas in the US that housed such stockpiles. Destruction of most of the munitions has gone without a hitch, and is expected to be completed during the next decade. However, the documented contamination left by the Monsanto factory will last lifetimes.

This fact belies the natural beauty of Anniston–Oxford's location at the foothills of the Blue Ridge Mountain chain. As the southernmost length of the Appalachian Mountains, the world's oldest mountain range, it is home to diverse species of birds, reptiles and mammals. Part of the former Fort McClellan is now operating as Mountain Longleaf National Wildlife Refuge.

== Famous people from Anniston–Oxford ==
- Michael Biehn, actor
- Red Byron, NASCAR driver
- William Levi Dawson, composer of Negro Folk Symphony
- Cow Cow Davenport, Boogie-woogie pianist
- Kevin Greene, NFL Linebacker
- David Satcher, former Surgeon General
- Patrick J. Que Smith, hip-hop songwriter
- James R. Hall, Lieutenant General United States Army
- Eric Davis, NFL Linebacker
- Riley Green, country singer (from Jacksonville)

== See also ==
- Alabama census statistical areas
- Anniston Army Depot
- Anniston Museum of Natural History
- Cheaha State Park
- Coosa River
- Fort McClellan
- Jacksonville State University
- Mountain Longleaf National Wildlife Refuge
- Talladega Super Speedway
