= WVOK =

WVOK may refer to:

- WVOK-FM, a radio station (97.9 FM) licensed to serve Oxford, Alabama, United States
- WTAZ (AM), a radio station (1580 AM) licensed to serve Oxford, which held the call sign WVOK from 2002 to 2023
