= WWFC (disambiguation) =

WWFC generally refers to English association football club Wolverhampton Wanderers F.C.

WWFC may also refer to:

- WWFC-LP, a defunct radio station (99.9 FM) formerly licensed to serve Bryant, Alabama, United States
- Wycombe Wanderers F.C., an English association football club
- Whitehill Welfare F.C., a Scottish association football club
- Woodlands Wellington FC, a Singaporean association football club
- Wuxi Wugo F.C., a Chinese association football club
