= WJES =

Saluda, South Carolina; United States
- Frequency: 1200 kHz

Ownership
- Owner: Carolina Broadcast Partners, LLC
- Sister stations: WABB; WULA; WYDK

History
- First air date: June 12, 1961
- Last air date: June 1, 2009
- Former frequencies: 1570 kHz (1961–1978); 1190 kHz (1978–2008)
- Call sign meaning: Johnston, Edgefield, Saluda

Technical information
- Facility ID: 18655
- Class: D
- Power: 10,000 watts (day); 6,100 watts (critical hours); 4 watts (night)
- Transmitter coordinates: 33°57′27.5″N 81°47′33.4″W

WJES (1200 AM) was an American radio station licensed to serve the community of Saluda, the county seat of Saluda County, South Carolina. The station was licensed by the U.S. Federal Communications Commission (FCC) to broadcast on 1200 kHz with a power of 10 kW during the day, 6.1 kW during critical hours, and 4 watts at night. The station, established in 1961, was last owned by Jeff and Angie Roper through their Carolina Broadcast Partners, LLC, holding company.

== Programming ==
WJES was an adult standards/oldies music radio station, simulcasting sister station WCRS. The station featured programming from Citadel Media's "Timeless" satellite feed. Before that, WJES carried an oldies music format.

== History ==
WJES was first licensed on September 1, 1961. In 2008, the station increased its daytime power to 10 kilowatts, moved frequencies from 1190 to 1200 kHz, and changed its city of license from Johnston, South Carolina, to Saluda.

Citing financial difficulties, the station went dark on June 1, 2009, and did not return to the air. Under the terms of the Telecommunications Act of 1996, as a matter of law a radio station's broadcast license is subject to automatic forfeiture and cancellation if they fail to broadcast for one full year. In July 2011, the license was retroactively cancelled by the FCC on June 2, 2010, and the WJES call sign was deleted on the FCC database on July 18, 2011.
