= WLFW =

Coordinates: 33.755°N 81.845°W

- Johnston, South Carolina; United States
- Broadcast area: Augusta, Georgia
- Frequency: 92.7 MHz
- Branding: The Life 92.7

Programming
- Format: Southern gospel

Ownership
- Owner: The Power Foundation

History
- First air date: August 26, 1985
- Former call signs: WTQY (9/1984-10/1984, CP); WKSX-FM (1984–2020)

Technical information
- Licensing authority: FCC
- Facility ID: 18656
- Class: A
- ERP: 1,800 watts
- HAAT: 176 meters (577 ft)

Links
- Public license information: Public file; LMS
- Webcast: Listen live
- Website: thelife927.com

WLFW is a southern gospel-formatted radio station located in Johnston, South Carolina, and is part of the Augusta, Georgia, radio market (mostly on the South Carolina side of the Savannah River). The station is licensed by the Federal Communications Commission (FCC) to broadcast at 92.7 FM with an effective radiated power (ERP) of 1.8 kW.

== History ==
WLFW signed on August 26, 1985, as WKSX-FM, the FM to WJES (1190 AM), simulcasting full-time. Both stations had a mostly satellite-fed adult contemporary format, with local high school sports. For a time in the late 1980s/early 1990s, the station would feature album rock at night, but was gone by the fall of 1991, replaced with oldies. The station segued into oldies full-time by 1992 as "Oldies 92.7".

In 1996, WKSX-FM was paired with 92.1 WJRQ in Saluda, South Carolina. WJRQ became WJES-FM and both stations became "The Twins", still with an oldies format. This lasted until 2004, when WJES-FM was sold and moved to Irmo, South Carolina, becoming WWNU. After the sale, WKSX-FM continued with the oldies format and featured Carolina beach music programming on the weekends. The station's news and sports programming included NBC News Radio, South Carolina Radio Network and USC Gamecocks athletics.

The station was owned by Michaelsen Communications LLC until it was sold effective October 8, 2020, to the Power Foundation, owner of The Life FM network, which changed the format to southern gospel. Power Foundation paid $180,000 to acquire WKSX-FM. The station changed its call sign on October 9 to WLFW.

== See also ==
- Media in Augusta, Georgia
