= WCJL =

WCJL may refer to:

- WCJL (FM), a radio station (89.1 FM) licensed to serve Margaret, Alabama, United States; see List of radio stations in Alabama
- WBKC (FM), a radio station (90.9 FM) licensed to serve Morgantown, Indiana, United States, which held the call sign WCJL from 2002 to 2021
