= WTAZ (AM) =

Radio station in Oxford–Anniston, Alabama

- Oxford, Alabama; United States
- Broadcast area: Anniston–Oxford metropolitan area
- Frequency: 1580 kHz
- Branding: Sports Radio 1580 The Stadium

Programming
- Format: Sports radio
- Affiliations: Fox Sports Radio

Ownership
- Owner: Woodard Broadcasting Company, Inc.
- Sister stations: WVOK-FM

History
- First air date: April 15, 1956
- Former call signs: WJHB (1956–1962); WEYY (1962–1986); WOXR (1986–2000); WARB (2000–2002); WVOK (2002–2023)

Technical information
- Licensing authority: FCC
- Facility ID: 73608
- Class: D
- Power: 2,500 watts (day); 22 watts (night)
- Transmitter coordinates: 33°35′29″N 85°49′44″W}

Links
- Public license information: Public file; LMS

WTAZ (1580 AM, "1580 The Stadium") is a commercial radio station broadcasting a sports format. Most programming comes from Fox Sports Radio with some local sports shows. Licensed to Oxford, Alabama, it serves the Anniston–Oxford metropolitan area. The station is owned by Woodard Broadcasting Company, Inc. The studios are on Church Street in Oxford.

WTAZ is a Class D station. By day, it is powered at 2,500 watts. But to protect other stations on 1580 AM from interference, at night it greatly reduces power to 22 watts.

== History ==
=== In Talladega: WJHB, WEYY ===
The Confederate Broadcasting Company, owned by W. K. Johnson, James Hemphill and Ned Butler, put WJHB on the air in Talladega, Alabama, on April 15, 1966. It was Talladega's second radio station and it was a daytimer, operating between sunrise and sunset with 1,000 watts.

The Tallabama Broadcasting Company, which owned WGSV in Guntersville and WGAD in Gadsden, acquired WJHB in 1961, with the sale closing in 1962. A new WEYY call sign was instituted along with the sale. The station was the victim of 1966 vandalism when someone disconnected the fuse blocks from the station's transmitter, causing a delay of more than two hours in signing it on for the day; general manager Jimmy Earl "Joe" Woodard said the intruder "apparently knew what he was doing" and was unsure as to the motive, since no items were stolen. WEYY's owners started a sister station, WANL, in Lineville in 1967; both stations broadcast country formats.

After having been the general manager since 1962, General manager Woodard became the owner when he acquired the station from former congressman Albert Rains in 1973; the licensee name was changed to the present Woodard Broadcasting Company in 1976. Features on WEYY in 1975 included Auburn Tigers football, ABC Contemporary newscasts, a daily Swap Shop, and a Gospel Music Showcase program at midday.

=== Move to Oxford ===
In 1973, Woodard opened WHTB (92.7 FM). 13 years later, he sought to reduce overlap between the AM and FM stations. On April 1, 1985, WHTB became WEYY-FM; the next year, 1580 AM moved to Oxford, Alabama as WOXR. The station broadcast an easy listening format, hoping to capture an audience that had listened to WHMA before that station flipped to country. 1580's move made it the first locally based radio station in Oxford, and Woodard gave it a second when Woodard settled with three competing applicants for a new FM station in the town in 1989—the first new FM for Calhoun County in 41 years—which signed on the air as adult contemporary WKFN "K-98" on February 19, 1990. The FM move enabled Woodard to remain competitive; within 18 months, K-98 was described as having changed Anniston into a two-station market opposite WHMA-FM "Alabama 100", while both stations' associated AMs had switched to automated programming.

By 2000, WOXR was airing a classic country format; it changed its call sign to WARB on August 28 of that year. The station changed its call sign to WVOK in 2002, matching the FM station which had adopted it in 1992. The station also adopted its present oldies format after changing its call sign.

On April 17, 2023, the station changed its call sign to WTAZ.
