= WARI (Alabama) =

- Abbeville, Alabama; United States
- Broadcast area: Dothan, Alabama
- Frequency: 1480 kHz

Programming
- Language: English

Ownership
- Owner: Abbeville Radio, Inc. (original owner); Genesis Radio Company, Inc. (last owner)
- Sister stations: WIZB

History
- First air date: August 31, 1951
- Last air date: September 9, 1996

Technical information
- Facility ID: 23616
- Class: D
- Power: 1,000 watts (daytime only)

WARI was an AM radio station licensed to Abbeville, Alabama. It operated on 1480 kHz from its inception on August 31, 1961, to its license cancellation on September 9, 1996. On February 22, 1968, WARI opened an FM station, WARI-FM. It began and continues to operate on 94.3 MHz as WIZB.

== History ==
WARI signed on the air on August 31, 1961. WARI was owned by Abbeville Radio, Inc. WARI's frequency was 1480 kHz and its initial power was 1 kW during daytime hours only. WARI's last owner was Genesis Radio Company, Inc. who bought the station on November 25, 1994. On September 9, 1996, Genesis Radio Co. asked the Federal Communications Commission (FCC) to dismiss the station's renewal and delete the license, to which the commission complied.
