= WTID (Thomaston, Alabama) =

Thomaston, Alabama; United States
- Frequency: 103.9 MHz

Programming
- Format: Defunct, was country music

Ownership
- Owner: Great South Wireless LLC
- Sister stations: WHPH

History
- First air date: 2001
- Last air date: February 6, 2018 (date of license surrender)
- Former call signs: WAYI (1998–2004); WSMO (2004–2006); WEZZ-FM (2006–2007); WGZZ (5-7/2007); WKGA (7-11/2007); WZLM (2007–2008)

Technical information
- Licensing authority: FCC
- Facility ID: 85767
- Class: A
- ERP: 500 watts
- HAAT: 14 meters (46 feet)
- Transmitter coordinates: 32°16′49″N 87°38′06″W

Links
- Public license information: Public file; LMS

WTID (103.9 FM) was a radio station licensed to serve Thomaston, Alabama. The station was owned by Great South Wireless LLC. The CEO of Great South Wireless LLC, a family owned commercial broadcast group, is Joan Reynolds.

== Programming ==
WTID previously broadcast a country music format. Syndicated music programming included America's Grand Ole Opry Weekend from Westwood One.

== History ==
This station received its original construction permit from the Federal Communications Commission on January 21, 1998. The new station was assigned the call letters WAYI by the FCC on March 6, 1998. WAYI received its license to cover from the FCC on April 17, 2001.

=== Falling silent ===
On July 26, 2002, the station went off the air. Citing staffing issues, Marengo Broadcast Associates applied to the FCC for special temporary authority to remain silent. The FCC granted this request on April 23, 2002, with an expiration date of October 23, 2002. With the staffing issues apparently unresolved, Marengo Broadcast Associates applied for an extension of this authority on October 23, 2002. The FCC granted the extension on October 25, 2002, with a caution that the station's license was subject to forfeiture if they did not resume broadcasting by February 26, 2003—one year after the station first fell silent.

The station resumed broadcasting before the deadline but went off the air again on May 8, 2003. This time, citing technical issues, Marengo Broadcast Associates again applied for special temporary authority to remain silent. The FCC approved this application on May 30, 2003, with an expiration date set for November 30, 2003.

=== New ownership ===
In September 2003, with the station still off the air, Great South RFDC LLC (Paul Scott Alexander, managing member) reached an agreement to purchase WAYI from Marengo Broadcast Associates (Lee S. Reynolds, president) for a reported sale price of $375,000. The deal was approved by the FCC on October 24, 2003, and the transaction was consummated on November 28, 2003.

On December 4, 2003, new owners Great South RFDC LLC cited ongoing technical issues related to new broadcast tower construction and requested an extension of the previous authority to remain silent. The extension was granted on December 11, 2003, with a caution that the station's license was subject to forfeiture if they did not resume broadcast operations by May 8, 2004—one year after the station fell silent. With another application pending and a new tower array under construction, the new owners had the FCC change the station's call letters to WSMO on May 25, 2004.

After resolving their technical issues with the transmitter site and the legal issues with the FCC, the station went back on the air on May 26, 2005. With all of these issues behind them and the station again broadcasting, the FCC renewed WSMO's license on June 28, 2005.

However, the station went off the air once again on December 16, 2005. While silent, the station swapped callsigns with then-sister station WEZZ-FM on January 26, 2006. This time the station owners waited until February 2006 to apply for special temporary authority to remain silent. The FCC granted this latest request on February 28, 2006, with an expiration date of May 28, 2006. With WEZZ-FM still off the air, Great South RFDC LLC applied for an extension on May 26, 2006. This extension was granted on June 5, 2006, with the standard caution that the station's license was subject to forfeiture if regular broadcasting did not resume by December 2, 2006.

In January 2007, this station was acquired by Great South Wireless LLC from Great South RFDC LLC as part of a six station deal for a reported total sale price of $100 plus an assumption of certain debts and obligations. After the transfer, the station had the FCC change the call letters three times in 2007: to WGZZ on May 28, 2007, to WKGA on July 18, 2007, and to WZLM on November 27, 2007.

=== Silent again ===
On March 25, 2008, WZLM went off the air as they "lost access to the power source that allows this station to operate" and planned to either gain access to a different power source or seek a new transmitter location. The FCC eventually granted this remain silent authority on September 3, 2008, with the standard legal caution that the station must resume broadcasting by March 25, 2009, or risk forfeiture of their broadcast license. The still-silent station was assigned the current WTID call letters by the FCC on July 16, 2008.

=== On air at 103.9 ===
On August 4, 2008, WTID was granted a construction permit to change broadcast frequencies from 97.7 MHz to 103.9 MHz. WTID returned to the air in March 2009, broadcasting on 103.9 MHz, before the March 25th FCC deadline. WTID was granted a license to cover the frequency change on March 30, 2009.

=== Construction permit ===
On February 18, 2009, WTID filed an application for a modification of their construction permit that would relocate their transmitter and change their community of license from Thomaston to Orrville, Alabama. This move would be accompanied by sister station WMRK moving to Thomaston from Selma, Alabama, so that the city "will not be left without local service".

=== License deleted ===
Great South Wireless surrendered the station's license to the FCC on February 6, 2018. WTID's license was deleted by the FCC on February 16, 2018.
