= WELB =

Defunct
- Elba, Alabama; United States
- Frequency: 1350 kHz

Ownership
- Owner: Rhett S. Snellgrove

History
- First air date: November 16, 1958
- Last air date: April 15, 2022 (63 years, 150 days)
- Call sign meaning: Elba

Technical information
- Facility ID: 19142
- Class: D
- Power: 1,000 watts (day); 44 watts (night)
- Transmitter coordinates: 31°27′06″N 86°04′09″W

WELB (1350 AM) was a radio station licensed to serve the community of Elba, Alabama, United States. The station operated from 1958 to 2022 and was last owned by Rhett S. Snellgrove, airing a Southern Gospel music format.

WELB began broadcasting on November 16, 1958. It was owned by Howard Parrish Jr., associated with station WOZK in Ozark, and began as a 1,000-watt, daytime-only outlet. Less than a year later, it was sold to Jim Dowdy and Jim Wilson. Ivy Jackson King Jr. and Frances King, of Opp, acquired WELB in 1964.

William "Doug" Holderfield purchased WELB in 1969; he ran the station through 2008, until selling to Rhett Snellgrove for $60,000. Derek Snellgrove had worked at the station since the age of 15. Holderfield, in addition to WELB, started WZTZ (later WVVL) in 1986; he was the longtime voice of Elba High School football. At the time of the sale, the station had a format of country and gospel music. The Federal Communications Commission cancelled the station’s license on February 9, 2024, as WELB had been silent since at least April 15, 2022.
