= WCOX =

- Camden, Alabama; United States
- Frequency: 1450 kHz

Ownership
- Owner: Down Home Broadcasting
- Sister stations: WYVC

History
- First air date: 1969
- Last air date: December 31, 2020
- Former frequencies: 1540 kHz
- Call sign meaning: Wilcox County

Technical information
- Facility ID: 17480
- Class: C
- Power: 1,000 watts (unlimited)
- Transmitter coordinates: 31°59′09″N 87°17′17″W

WCOX (1450 AM) was a radio station licensed to serve Camden, Alabama. The station was last owned by Down Home Broadcasting. It last aired a Gospel music format.

This station was a daytime-only station broadcasting on 1540 kHz before going full-time on 1450 kHz. The license was cancelled on December 31, 2020.

== History ==
In May 1981, the station's broadcast license was transferred to Harry A. Taylor and Betty J. Taylor doing business as Taylor and Taylor.

In June 1986, Taylor and Taylor reached an agreement to sell WCOX to Wilcox Network, Inc. The deal was approved by the Federal Communications Commission on September 29, 1986, and the transaction was consummated on November 4, 1986.

In February 1991, Wilcox Network, Inc. reached an agreement to sell the station to Down Home Broadcasting. The FCC approved the deal on April 8, 1991, and the transaction was consummated on April 28, 1991.

== License issues ==
The station filed a routine license renewal request on June 8, 2004. However, this application was filed six months after it was due and two months after the license had expired. As the licensee had also failed to pay the required regulatory fees, the FCC dismissed the renewal application on January 12, 2005, and ordered the station to cease broadcast operations. The station's license was cancelled and its call sign deleted from the FCC database on June 24, 2005.

The station continued normal broadcast operations in defiance of the FCC's order and applied for reinstatement of their license on May 22, 2006. After more than seven months of deliberation, the FCC decided to restore the station's license and call sign even after finding that Down Home Broadcasting "apparently willfully and repeatedly violated" FCC rules and "unauthorized operation" for which they were fined $14,000.

The station was reassigned the WCOX call letters by the FCC on January 31, 2007. On March 7, 2007, the station's license was reinstated after the fine had been paid and other regulatory requirements had been satisfied. On April 6, 2012, the FCC again cancelled the station's license and deleted its callsign from the FCC database.

The station's license was reinstated in July 2013. The station went silent on January 24, 2015, to prepare to be sold to new owners, with WYVC FM to continue to be owned and operated by Down Home Broadcasting.

WCOX's license was cancelled again on December 31, 2020.
