= Oxford, Alabama =

City in Alabama, United States

Oxford
- City
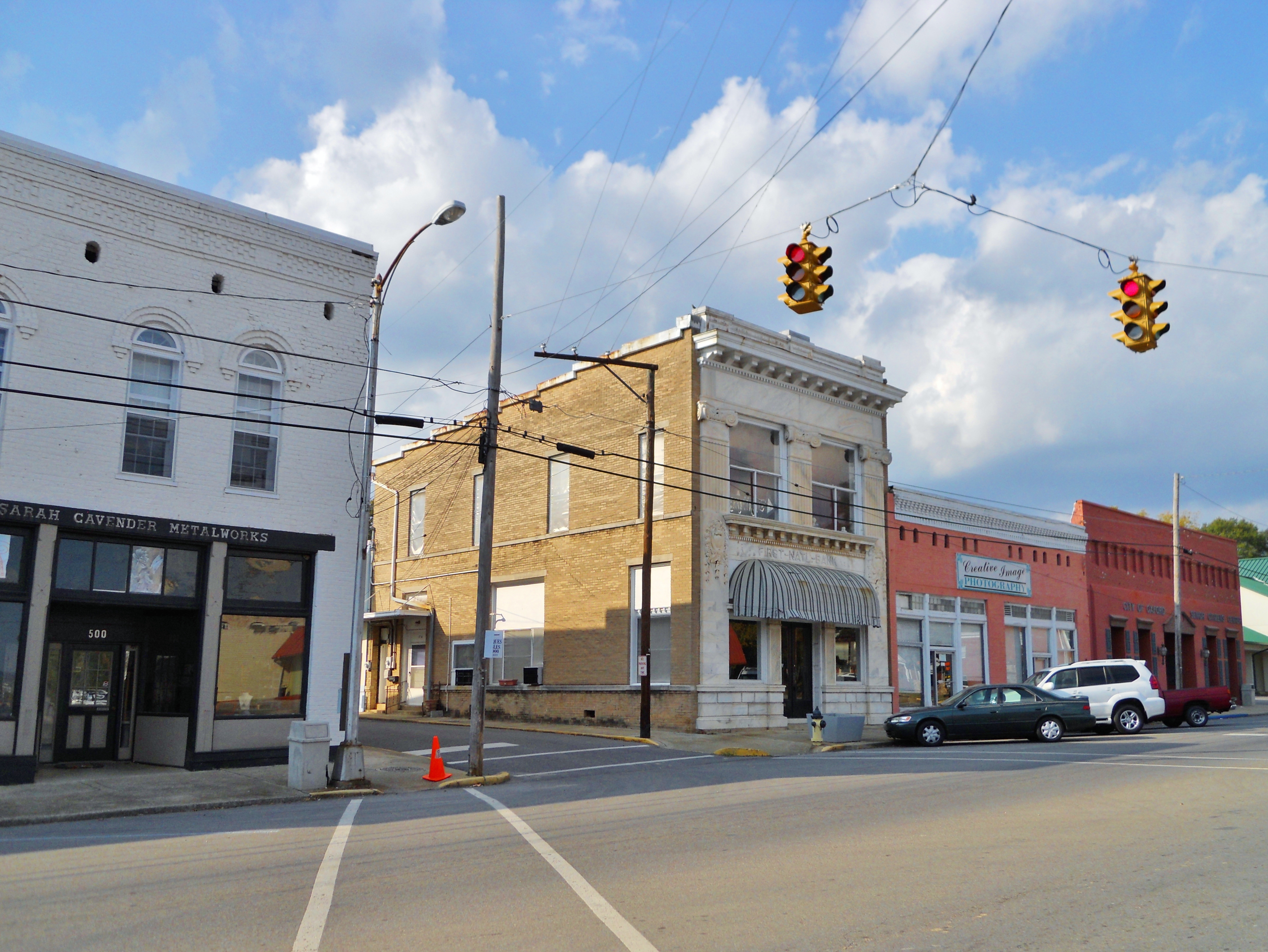
- Downtown Oxford

- Seal
- Nickname: Crossroads to the Future
- Location of Oxford in Calhoun County and Talladega County, Alabama.
- Coordinates: 33°37′10″N 85°52′20″W
- Country: United States
- State: Alabama
- Counties: Calhoun, Talladega, Cleburne

Area
  - Total: 32.19 sq mi (83.36 km^{2})
  - Land: 31.82 sq mi (82.42 km^{2})
  - Water: 0.36 sq mi (0.94 km^{2})
- Elevation: 646 ft (197 m)

Population (2020)
  - Total: 22,069
  - Density: 693.5/sq mi (267.76/km^{2})
- Time zone: UTC-6 (Central)
  - Summer (DST): UTC-5 (Central)
- ZIP code: 36203, 36201, 36207, 36253
- Area code: 256/938
- FIPS code: 01-57576
- GNIS feature ID: 2404451
- Website: www.oxfordal.gov

Oxford is a city in Calhoun, Talladega, and Cleburne counties in the State of Alabama, United States. The population was 22,069 at the 2020 census. Oxford is one of two principal cities of and included in the Anniston-Oxford Metropolitan Statistical Area, and it is the largest city in Calhoun County by population.

== History ==
Founded in the early 1850s, Oxford was the first city in Calhoun County to be incorporated, in 1852. The name "Oxford" was due to the presence of a narrow crossing of Chocolocco Creek that allowed farmers to ford cattle from one side of the creek to the other. Since 1970, Oxford has annexed large amounts of land to the south and west, including the communities of Coldwater and Bynum. In 1970, it was all in Calhoun County, but today it includes areas in Talladega County and Cleburne County.

A smaller municipality, Hobson City, was once a part of Oxford. The area, then known as the Mooree Quarter, is one square mile, and is located north and west of Oxford, and south and west of Anniston. The new town became incorporated on August 16, 1899, as Hobson City, taking the name of a naval hero of the Spanish–American War. Another result was the creation of only the second town in the United States (after Eatonville, Florida) with 100% black government, and an almost 100% black population (at least at first).

== Geography ==
According to the U.S. Census Bureau, the city has a total area of 32.2 square miles (83.3 km^{2}), of which 31.72 square miles (82.15 km^{2}) is land and 0.35 square miles (0.9 km^{2}), or 1.07%, is water.

Oxford lies among the foothills at the southern end of the Blue Ridge Mountains. Nearby Cheaha Mountain is Alabama's highest point and offers expansive views of the surrounding wilderness and the city below. Much of the city's southern border is shared with the Talladega National Forest.

Major bodies of water include Oxford Lake, Choccolocco Park Lake, Lake Hillabee, Snow Creek, and the Choccolocco Creek that bisects the city.

Oxford is located mainly in the southern part of Calhoun County and is located along Interstate 20, which runs through the southern part of the city, with access from exits 179, 185, 188, and 191. Via I-20, Birmingham is 62 mi (100 km) west, and Atlanta is 88 mi (142 km) east. U.S. Route 78 also runs through the city and connects it to Cleburne County, paralleling I-20. Alabama State Route 21 connects the city with the city of Talladega, which is southwest 21 mi (34 km).

=== Climate ===
According to the Köppen climate classification, Oxford has a humid subtropical climate (abbreviated Cfa).

Climate data for Oxford, 1991–2020 simulated normals (653 ft elevation)
Month	Jan	Feb	Mar	Apr	May	Jun	Jul	Aug	Sep	Oct	Nov	Dec	Year
Mean daily maximum °F (°C)	54.0 (12.2)	58.1 (14.5)	66.4 (19.1)	74.3 (23.5)	81.0 (27.2)	87.1 (30.6)	90.0 (32.2)	89.4 (31.9)	85.1 (29.5)	75.6 (24.2)	64.8 (18.2)	56.7 (13.7)	73.5 (23.1)
Daily mean °F (°C)	43.2 (6.2)	46.6 (8.1)	54.0 (12.2)	61.5 (16.4)	69.4 (20.8)	76.5 (24.7)	79.7 (26.5)	79.0 (26.1)	73.9 (23.3)	63.0 (17.2)	52.2 (11.2)	45.7 (7.6)	62.1 (16.7)
Mean daily minimum °F (°C)	32.2 (0.1)	35.1 (1.7)	41.4 (5.2)	48.7 (9.3)	57.9 (14.4)	65.8 (18.8)	69.4 (20.8)	68.5 (20.3)	62.6 (17.0)	50.5 (10.3)	39.6 (4.2)	34.7 (1.5)	50.5 (10.3)
Average precipitation inches (mm)	5.27 (133.88)	5.48 (139.26)	5.50 (139.60)	4.78 (121.33)	4.27 (108.49)	4.76 (120.98)	4.61 (117.05)	3.78 (96.00)	3.11 (78.90)	3.44 (87.38)	4.45 (112.92)	5.16 (131.15)	54.61 (1,386.94)
Average dew point °F (°C)	33.8 (1.0)	36.3 (2.4)	41.9 (5.5)	49.6 (9.8)	59.4 (15.2)	66.9 (19.4)	70.2 (21.2)	69.3 (20.7)	63.9 (17.7)	53.4 (11.9)	42.4 (5.8)	37.2 (2.9)	52.0 (11.1)
Source: Prism Climate Group

== Demographics ==
Historical population
Census	Pop.	Note	%±
1880	780		—
1890	1,473		88.8%
1900	1,372		−6.9%
1910	1,090		−20.6%
1920	1,108		1.7%
1930	1,206		8.8%
1940	1,393		15.5%
1950	1,697		21.8%
1960	3,603		112.3%
1970	4,361		21.0%
1980	8,939		105.0%
1990	9,362		4.7%
2000	14,592		55.9%
2010	21,348		46.3%
2020	22,069		3.4%
U.S. Decennial Census; 2018 Estimate

=== 2020 census ===
As of the 2020 census, Oxford had a population of 22,069 and 5,604 families residing in the city. The population density was 677 inhabitants per square mile (261/km^{2}).

The median age was 40.1 years. 23.6% of residents were under the age of 18 and 17.7% of residents were 65 years of age or older. For every 100 females there were 92.6 males, and for every 100 females age 18 and over there were 88.4 males age 18 and over.

90.3% of residents lived in urban areas, while 9.7% lived in rural areas.

There were 8,598 households in Oxford, of which 33.5% had children under the age of 18 living in them. Of all households, 49.1% were married-couple households, 16.7% were households with a male householder and no spouse or partner present, and 28.2% were households with a female householder and no spouse or partner present. About 25.7% of all households were made up of individuals and 11.1% had someone living alone who was 65 years of age or older.

There were 9,313 housing units, of which 7.7% were vacant. The homeowner vacancy rate was 1.8% and the rental vacancy rate was 9.2%.

Racial composition as of the 2020 census
Race	Number	Percent
White	15,654	70.9%
Black or African American	3,664	16.6%
American Indian and Alaska Native	112	0.5%
Asian	385	1.7%
Native Hawaiian and Other Pacific Islander	9	0.0%
Some other race	948	4.3%
Two or more races	1,297	5.9%
Hispanic or Latino (of any race)	1,750	7.9%

== Economy ==
The city's growth in recent years can be attributed mainly to the presence of Interstate 20 and Oxford's central location between Atlanta and Birmingham. The Quintard Mall is the only fully enclosed shopping mall between Birmingham and Douglasville, Georgia. Several other shopping centers dot the landscape of Oxford with the most recent being the construction of the Oxford Commons which is just off exit 188 on Interstate 20.

== Arts and culture ==
- Oxford Performing Arts Center
- Quintard Mall

== Government ==
Oxford features a mayor-council form of government, though the mayor actually dictates the daily running of the city. Alton Craft is the current mayor, having succeeded former Mayor Leon Smith, whose mayorship began in 1984 and retired from office after his eighth term in 2016. Craft previously was the Finance Director of Oxford for over two decades. The five-member council includes Phil Gardner (Place 1), Charlotte Hubbard (Place 2), Mike Henderson (Place 3), Chris Spurlin (Place 4, Council President), and Steven Waits (Place 5, Council President Pro Tempore). The mayor and city council members are elected to four-year terms that coincided with presidential election years. In 2021, a bill was passed in the Alabama legislature that moved many municipal elections, including Oxford's, to non-presidential election years. The next election will be in 2025 and will then be held every four years.

== Education ==
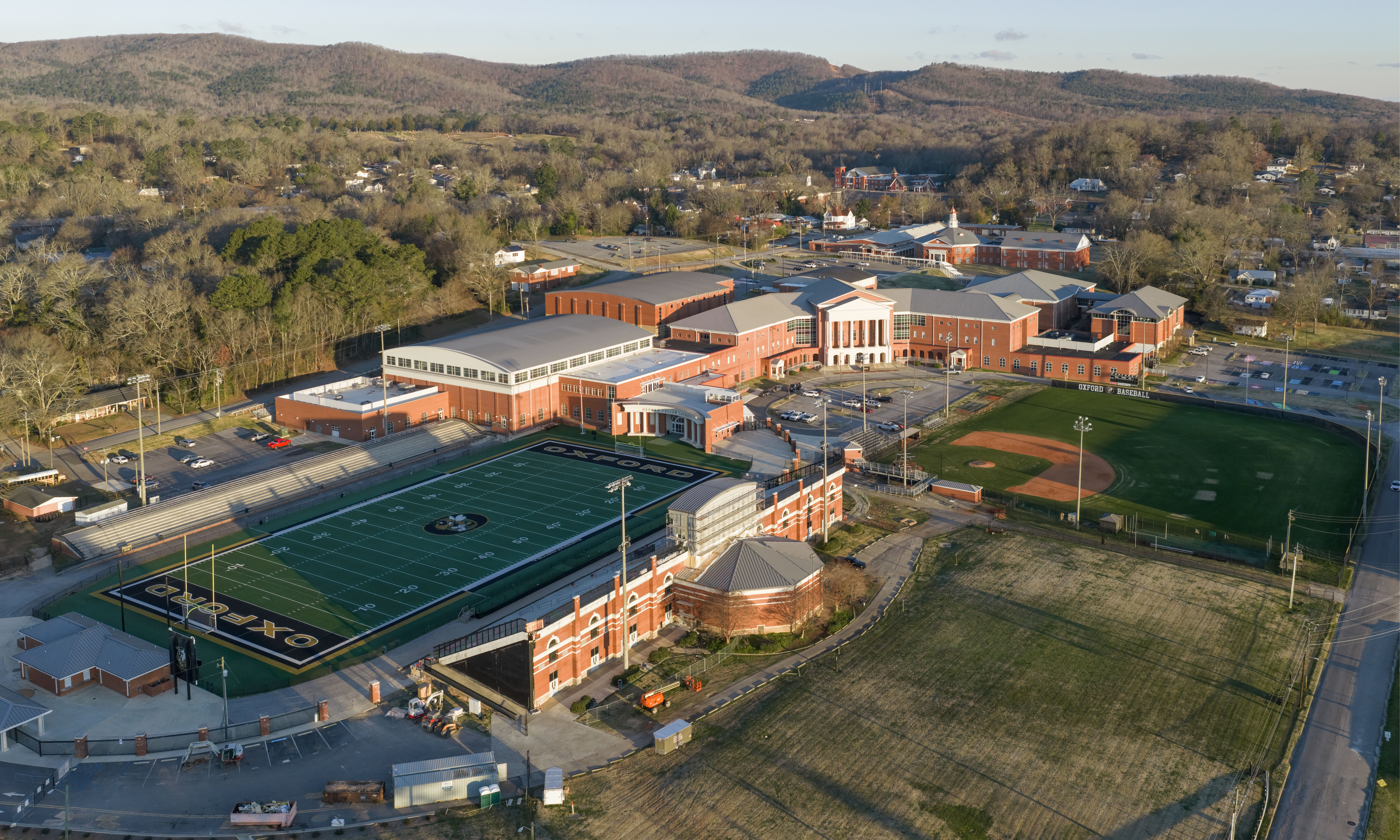
Oxford High School

Oxford's public schools are administered by the Oxford City Schools. There are four elementary schools, one middle school, and one high school. A new Oxford High School building opened in August 2010, as well as a new Technical Building.

== Media ==
- WTBJ-FM 91.3 (Christian Radio)
- WTDR-FM 92.7 (Country)
- WVOK-FM 97.9 (Adult Contemporary)
- WTAZ 1580 (Oldies)
- WEAC-CD TV 24 (Television Broadcast Station)
- The Anniston Star (25,000 circulation daily newspaper)
- Oxford Independent (weekly newspaper)
- Insight (a bi-monthly entertainment and event paper serving Oxford and Calhoun county)

== Infrastructure ==
=== Transportation ===
Areawide Community Transportation System provides local bus service on an hourly schedule in Oxford. Major highways passing through the city include:

- Interstate 20
- U.S. Highway 78 (Hamric Drive)
- U.S. Highway 431 (Leon Smith Parkway from I-20 northward)
- State Route 21 (Quintard Drive)
- State Route 202

=== Law enforcement ===
The city maintains a 64-member police department. The agency is divided into Uniform Division, Criminal Investigation Division, Administrative Division. The agency also has several specialized units including Special Investigations Division, Emergency Services Unit, Traffic Homicide Unit, Aviation Unit, and Honor Guard.

== Notable people ==
- Kwon Alexander, NFL linebacker
- The Bridges, folk rock band
- K. J. Britt, NFL, Tampa Bay Buccaneers
- Rick Burgess, half of the nationally syndicated radio program Rick and Bubba
- Asa Earl Carter, Ku Klux Klan leader, segregationist speech writer, and later famed western novelist
- Tae Davis, NFL, Cleveland Browns
- Trae Elston, NFL, Miami Dolphins
- Chris Hammond, former Major League Baseball pitcher
- Terry Henley, former Auburn University and National Football League running back
- Vic Henley, professional comedian
- Maud McLure Kelly, first woman lawyer in Alabama
- Lash LeRoux, cartoonist and former professional wrestler
- Bobby McCain, NFL, Miami Dolphins
- Felton Snow, baseball player in the Negro leagues
- Jackson Stephens, Major League Pitcher Atlanta Braves
- Jim Stephens, former Major League Baseball catcher
- Roc Thomas, NFL, Minnesota Vikings
