= WIQR (Alabama) =

Radio station in Prattville, Alabama (1969–2016)

- Prattville, Alabama; United States
- Broadcast area: Montgomery, Alabama
- Frequency: 1410 kHz

Ownership
- Owner: Star Power Communications Corporation

History
- First air date: 1969
- Last air date: 2016
- Former call signs: WPXC (1969–1980); WTOA (1980–1981); WIQR (1981–1988); WSKN (1988–1989); WRNB (1989–1995)

Technical information
- Facility ID: 8544
- Class: B
- Power: 5,000 watts (day); 1,000 watts (night)
- Transmitter coordinates: 32°25′23″N 86°26′21″W

WIQR (1410 AM) was a radio station formerly licensed to serve Prattville, Alabama, United States. The station was owned by Star Power Communications Corporation and served the Montgomery, Alabama, area.

It once aired Spanish sports radio format and featured programming from ESPN Deportes Radio. In 2015 this station was doing classic Soul and R&B tunes. As of December 2015, this station went silent.

The station was most recently reassigned the WIQR call letters by the Federal Communications Commission (FCC) on December 5, 1996. The station can be heard as far east as Atlanta.

The station's license was cancelled on March 12, 2019, due to WIQR having been silent since at least June 3, 2016.

== Programming ==
Notable former on-air personalities included Max Howell, Jim Rome, Tim Brando, Arnie Spanier, David Stein, Tony Bruno, and Todd Wright.

The station was an affiliate of the Atlanta Braves radio network through the 2008 season. Beginning with the 2009 season, WIQR was the local affiliate for the Tampa Bay Rays, the parent club to the Montgomery Biscuits of the Southern League.

WIQR was an affiliate of the UAB Blazers ISP Sports Network airing all of the UAB Blazers football games and football coaches' shows.
