= WTQX =

- Selma, Alabama; United States
- Frequency: 1570 kHz

Programming
- Format: Urban contemporary

Ownership
- Owner: Bob Carl Bailey

History
- First air date: May 19, 1956
- Last air date: 1996
- Former call signs: WRWJ (1956–1966)

Technical information
- Power: 5,000 watts (daytime only)

WTQX was a radio station broadcasting on 1570 kHz in Selma, Alabama, United States. It was last owned by Bob Carl Bailey.

== History ==
Roland W. Jordan, Jr., trading as the Central Alabama Broadcasting Company, was approved on November 2, 1955, to build a new radio station on 1570 kHz with 1,000 watts power during daylight hours only in Selma. The station began broadcasting as WRWJ on May 19, 1956. Studios were initially located in the Hotel Albert before relocating to a building on Dallas Avenue in 1961. WRWJ began operating on 5,000 watts power in March 1963.

In 1966, Kathleen E. Stutts purchased WRWJ from Jordan. On Thanksgiving Day, the station changed its call letters to WTQX and its format from country music to Top 40, with additional programming from the Mutual Broadcasting System. However, in 1972, WTQX switched formats and began aiming itself at the Black community in Selma, though it was White-owned.

In October 1977, Stutts appointed Bob Carl Bailey, a former employee of broadcast stations in Selma, Montgomery, and Atlanta, as WTQX's general manager. This caused Marius Anderson, the program director, to be reassigned to general sales manager; he considered this a demotion and resigned. Bailey, manager of station WZZA in Tuscumbia and WRCK-FM in Sheffield, had been interested all year in acquiring WTQX, as had other Black leaders; he also objected to a program the station aired, Freedom in Session, that called for a boycott of stores at the Selma Mall. Tension over the program as well as what Anderson and others viewed as the systematic firing of the station's existing staff and the fact that Bailey insisted on having majority control of any partnership with local leaders to purchase WTQX led to it being picketed in December 1977. Community members demanded Stutts oust Bailey and rehire the fired staffers; she refused. Nevertheless, the Stutts sold the station to Bailey, a deal approved by the FCC in March 1979.

WTQX remained the only radio station oriented to Black audiences in Selma throughout the 1980s and was the second most listened to station in the area in 1989. It rebuilt its studios in 1990. However, by 1996, its license had been canceled and the station described as "vacant" when it was the victim of a burglary.
