= WBYE =

Radio station in Calera, Alabama (1958–2012)

Calera, Alabama; United States
- Broadcast area: Birmingham, Alabama
- Frequency: 1370 kHz

Programming
- Format: Gospel music

Ownership
- Owner: Progressive United Communications, Inc.

History
- First air date: January 12, 1958
- Last air date: April 6, 2012

Technical information
- Facility ID: 71243
- Class: D
- Power: 1,000 watts (day only)
- Transmitter coordinates: 33°5′26″N 86°46′37″W

WBYE (1370 AM) was an American radio station formerly licensed to the community of Calera, Alabama, and serving the greater Birmingham, Alabama, area. The station was owned by Progressive United Communications, Inc. It aired a Gospel music format.

== History ==
In 1957 the station was assigned the WBYE call letters by the Federal Communications Commission.

In June 1983, Shelby County Advertising Corporation reached an agreement to sell WBYE to B.M. Murchison. The deal was approved by the FCC on August 18, 1983, and the transaction was consummated on December 12, 1983.

In January 1986, B.M, Murchison reached an agreement to sell WBYE to Thomas Ellsworth Leighton. The deal was approved by the FCC on February 24, 1986, and the transaction was consummated on March 20, 1986.

In March 1989, Laura Lou Roberts Leighton, executrix of the estate of Thomas Ellsworth Leighton, reached an agreement to sell this radio station to WBYE Broadcasting Company, Inc. The deal was approved by the FCC on March 2, 1989, and the transaction was consummated on April 10, 1989.

In November 1999, WBYE Broadcasting Company, Inc., reached an agreement to sell WBYE to Progressive United Communications, Inc. The deal was approved by the FCC on February 4, 2000, and the transaction was consummated on April 28, 2000.

On April 6, 2012, the station's license was cancelled and its call sign deleted from the FCC's database.
