= WTBF =

WTBF and WTBF-FM

WTBF: Troy, Alabama; WTBF-FM: Brundidge, Alabama; United States
- Frequencies: WTBF: 970 kHz; WTBF-FM: 94.7 MHz
- Branding: WTBF Radio

Programming
- Format: WTBF: Sports; WTBF-FM: Classic hits
- Affiliations: Westwood One Classic Hits, Westwood One Sports

Ownership
- Owner: Troy Broadcasting Corp.

History
- First air date: WTBF: February 25, 1947; WTBF-FM: 1997
- Call sign meaning: We're Troy's Best Friend

Technical information
- Licensing authority: FCC
- Facility ID: WTBF: 68179; WTBF-FM: 68181
- Class: WTBF: D; WTBF-FM: C3
- Power: WTBF: 5,000 watts (day); 45 watts (night)
- ERP: WTBF-FM: 14,500 watts
- HAAT: WTBF-FM: 132 meters (433 ft)
- Transmitter coordinates: WTBF: 31°50′7″N 85°55′58″W; WTBF-FM: 31°40′41.6″N 85°56′36.8″W
- Translator(s): 96.3 W242DA (Troy)

Links
- Public license information: WTBF: Public file; LMS; WTBF-FM: Public file; LMS
- Webcast: Listen live
- Website: www.wtbfradio.com

WTBF (970 kHz) and WTBF-FM (94.7 MHz) are radio stations serving Troy, Alabama, United States. (Note: The FM station's city of license is Brundidge, Alabama.) The stations are owned by Troy Broadcasting Corporation and broadcast sports radio from Westwood One Sports on AM and classic hits on FM. The WTBF studios are located on Court Square, the AM transmitter is in the Union Hill area northeast of Troy, and the FM transmitter is in the Spring Hill area south of Troy.

WTBF AM began broadcasting in 1947. It was the first radio station based in Troy in 15 years. For its first 50 years of operation, its studios were on the campus of Troy State University (now Troy University) before relocating to the present site. The FM station began broadcasting in 1997. The AM broadcasts Troy Trojans athletic events as well as Atlanta Braves baseball and high school sports.

== History ==
On December 29, 1945, the Troy Broadcasting Corporation—a group of 15 local businessmen—applied to the Federal Communications Commission (FCC) to build a new radio station in Troy, Alabama, on 1490 kHz. The FCC approved the application on May 24, 1946, and WTBF began broadcasting on February 25, 1947, from studios on College Drive. At launch, it broadcast for 16 1/2 hours a day; shortly after, it began airing programming from the Mutual Broadcasting System. One of the partners in the station at its launch was Cyril Reddoch, who had been a partner in the first station to be established at Troy, WHET. That station later moved to Dothan as WAGF. At the time it signed on, its 304-foot (93 m) self-supporting tower was tied with that of WALA in Mobile for the tallest in Alabama. Troy Broadcasting Corporation filed to change the station's frequency to 970 kHz and increase power to 5,000 watts day and 500 watts at night in 1955. The FCC approved in March 1956.

Jess Jordan was part of WTBF's staff from the day it signed on and served as its general manager beginning in 1951. When Jordan died in 1977—his body found after he failed to report to work—The Montgomery Advertiser called him "one of Alabama's best-known broadcasters". In other areas, WTBF also had stability: it had only three morning show hosts for the first 67 years of its history. WTBF was among the first stations to play two songs that became hits: the 1978 song "Smoke from a Distant Fire" by the Sanford-Townsend Band of Montgomery and the 1981 rap song "Double Dutch Bus". By the mid-1980s, WTBF aired adult contemporary music during the day and contemporary hit radio at night, the latter to serve Troy's large college population. It flipped to country music in 1987.

In the late 1980s, Troy Broadcasting was one of ten applicants, later winnowed to three, for a new FM station at Brundidge. The FCC's review board and the full commission awarded the station to Troy Broadcasting. Litigation with the competing applicants, as well as the end of the FCC's comparative hearing process after a 1994 court decision, led to a settlement agreement in 1996. In 1997, WTBF left the Troy campus for its present studios.

WTBF AM began broadcasting a sports format in the 2010s and commenced service from an FM translator in 2018.
