= WRYD =

Radio station in Jemison, Alabama

- Jemison, Alabama; United States
- Broadcast area: Greater Birmingham - Central Alabama
- Frequency: 97.7 MHz

Programming
- Format: Christian Talk and Teaching
- Network: American Family Radio

Ownership
- Owner: American Family Association
- Sister stations: WJHO, WKRE, WKUA

History
- First air date: May 15, 1953
- Former call signs: WEZZ (1953–1982); WEZZ-FM (1982–2006); WHPH (2006–2018)

Technical information
- Licensing authority: FCC
- Facility ID: 61231
- Class: C3
- ERP: 13,000 watts
- HAAT: 140 meters (460 ft)
- Transmitter coordinates: 32°58′55″N 86°51′02″W

Links
- Public license information: Public file; LMS
- Webcast: Listen live
- Website: afr.net

WRYD (97.7 FM) is a non-commercial radio station licensed to Jemison, Alabama, and serving Central Alabama including parts of Greater Birmingham. It is owned by the American Family Association and part of the American Family Radio network, broadcasting from a transmitter is off County Route 107 west of Jemison.

== History ==
The station signed on the air on May 15, 1953. It was the FM sister station to WKLF (980 AM). The call sign was WEZZ and its original city of license was Clanton, Alabama. It was powered at only 3,000 watts, a fraction of its current output.

In August 2003, the station's longtime owner, Southeastern Broadcasting Company, Inc., reached an agreement to sell WEZZ to Great South RFDC, LLC. The deal was approved by the FCC on October 30, 2003, and the transaction was consummated on November 28, 2003. In January 2007, this station was acquired by Great South Wireless LLC from Great South RFDC LLC as part of a six station deal for a reported total sale price of $100 plus an assumption of certain debts and obligations.

Effective July 23, 2018, TBTA Ministries closed on the purchase of the then-WHPH from Great South Wireless for $525,000. The following day, the new owners changed the station's format from oldies to Christian rock, branded as "Revocation Radio". The call letters were switched to WRYD on July 31, 2018.

On January 30, 2025, WRYD flipped from Christian rock to American Family Radio's format of Christian talk and teaching.
