= Anniston Museum of Natural History =

- Established: December 1976
- Location: Anniston, Alabama
- Coordinates: 33.6965°N 85.8201°W
- Type: Natural history museum
- Visitors: 85,000 each year (average)
- Director: Alan Robison
- Curator: Daniel D. Spaulding
- Website: Anniston Museum of Natural History

The Anniston Museum of Natural History is a museum in Lagarde Park, Anniston, Alabama, exhibiting more than 2,000 natural history items on permanent display, including minerals, fossils, and rare animals in open dioramas.

In addition to exploring Alabama’s natural heritage, the museum features diorama-style exhibits that begin in pre-history and extend to the North American wilderness and the African savannah. Each of the museum's seven exhibit halls explores a different natural history theme. The Environments of Africa Hall contains more than 100 African animals displayed in simulated natural settings. Other highlights include 2,000-year-old Egyptian mummies from the Ptolemaic period, a cave-dwelling creatures exhibit and a children’s discovery room. The Dynamic Earth depicts the planet's formation and includes minerals, fossils, gemstones and dinosaurs. Nature Space offers a large learning area with hands-on activities. On the grounds are a wildlife garden, open-air animal exhibits, nature trails and the Berman Museum of World History.

A Changing Exhibit Gallery provides fresh exhibits on a regular basis.

The museum's history dates from 1930, when H. Severn Regar offered his personal collection of historical objects and biological specimens to the city of Anniston. Included were extinct and endangered species collected by 19th-century naturalist William Werner. This gift formed the cornerstone of the museum’s Birds of the Americas exhibit hall, which features more than 400 specimens of North American birds in their habitats. The museum is an affiliate of the Smithsonian Institution.
