= WZCT =

- Scottsboro, Alabama; United States
- Frequency: 1330 kHz

Ownership
- Owner: Bonner and Carlile Enterprises

History
- First air date: 1952
- Last air date: February 16, 2021
- Former call signs: WROS (1952–1978); WKEA (1978–1986); WSGG (1986–1990)

Technical information
- Facility ID: 6357
- Class: D
- Power: 5000 watts (day); 38 watts (night)
- Transmitter coordinates: 34°42′13″N 86°00′19″W

WZCT (1330 AM, "Southern Gospel Z-13") was a radio station licensed to serve Scottsboro, Alabama. The station was last owned by Bonner and Carlile Enterprises. It aired a Southern Gospel music format.

The station was assigned the WZCT call letters by the Federal Communications Commission (FCC) on March 5, 1990. The station's owners surrendered its license on February 16, 2021, and it was cancelled on March 1, 2021.
