= WVFG =

- Uniontown, Alabama; United States
- Frequency: 107.5 MHz
- Branding: V 107.5

Programming
- Format: Urban/Gospel

Ownership
- Owner: Charles E. Jones, Jr.

History
- First air date: 1995

Technical information
- Licensing authority: FCC
- Facility ID: 30281
- Class: A
- ERP: 8,000 watts
- HAAT: 100 meters
- Transmitter coordinates: 32°22′38″N 87°31′25″W

Links
- Public license information: Public file; LMS
- Website: wvfgradio.com

WVFG (107.5 FM) is an American radio station broadcasting an Urban/oldies gospel format. Licensed to serve the community of Uniontown, Alabama, the station is owned by Jones Communications .
