= WQHC =

- Hanceville, Alabama; United States
- Broadcast area: Cullman, Alabama
- Frequency: 1170 kHz

Ownership
- Owner: Fatima Family Apostolate International, Inc.

History
- First air date: 1986
- Last air date: April 2, 2020
- Former call signs: WHZI (1984–1990); WRJL (1990–1997); WXRP (1997–2007); WLYG (2007–2009)
- Call sign meaning: Queen of Heaven Catholic Radio

Technical information
- Facility ID: 57437
- Class: D
- Power: 850 watts (days only); 500 watts (critical hours)
- Transmitter coordinates: 34°04′28″N 86°46′44″W

WQHC (1170 AM) was a radio station licensed to serve Hanceville, Alabama, United States. The station was owned by Fatima Family Apostolate International, Inc. WQHC broadcast a Catholic radio format to the greater Cullman, Alabama, area.

== History ==
=== The beginning ===
This station received its original construction permit for a 500 watt daytime-only AM station at 1170 kHz from the Federal Communications Commission (FCC) on May 1, 1984. The station was assigned the call letters WHZI by the FCC on June 11, 1984. WHZI received its license to cover from the FCC on December 31, 1986.

In September 1990, owner Betty Jane Stinedurf reached an agreement to sell the station to Rojo, Inc. The deal was approved by the FCC on November 2, 1990, and the transaction was consummated on November 7, 1990. The new owners had the FCC change the station's call letters to WRJL on November 28, 1990. After a format change to rock music ("Rock Of The New Millennium"), the station's callsign was changed to WXRP on January 17, 1997.

In March 1999, Rojo, Inc., reached an agreement to sell this station to Maplewood Properties, LLC (Windol Jay Robinson, managing member) for a reported $175,000. The deal was approved by the FCC on April 28, 1999, and the transaction was consummated on May 7, 1999. Windol Jay Robinson died on July 15, 2001. After clearing probate, control of WXRP passed involuntarily from Windol Jay Robinson to Joseph Ralph Jolly, Jr., the executor of his estate, in January 2002. The transfer was approved by the FCC on January 28, 2002.

In May 2004, Maplewood Properties, LLC, reached an agreement to sell the station to WJR Broadcasting, Inc. The deal was approved by the FCC on June 29, 2004, and the transaction was consummated on September 27, 2004.

=== Joy Christian ===
Joy Christian logo

In December 2006, WJR Broadcasting, LLC, reached an agreement to donate this station as a charitable gift to Joy Christian Communications, Inc. The deal was approved by the FCC on March 5, 2007, and the transaction was consummated on March 16, 2007.

The new owners had the FCC change the call sign to WLYG on March 29, 2007. While it operated, Joy Christian broadcast a Southern Gospel music format. WLYG fell silent on October 15, 2007, after Joy Christian Communications lost its lease on the original tower site property. In a filing with the FCC, the station owners claimed that the landlord broke their lease agreement and that they were forced to remove their tower and broadcast equipment on short notice. They further stated that they had located land "very close to the original site" and were in negotiations to purchase the land with plans to erect their tower and file required documents with the FCC upon conclusion of the negotiations. In the meantime, WLYG requested temporary remaining silent authority from the commission. The FCC granted this request on October 31, 2007, with a scheduled expiration of April 28, 2008.

On November 15, 2008, WLYG fell silent again as owner Joy Christian Communications had lost their lease on the tower site and, in their application to the FCC for remain silent authority, noted that they were "in negotiations with the landlord to resume operations" at the site. On February 26, 2009, the station was granted a continuing stay-silent authority with a scheduled expiration of August 28, 2009.

=== WQHC ===
In December 2008, Joy Christian Communications, Inc. (Ed Smith, president) agreed to sell WLYG to Queen of Heaven Catholic Radio, Inc. (Marc Corsini, president) for a reported sale price of $18,000. At the time of the sale, the station was off the air. The deal was approved by the FCC on February 27, 2009, and the transaction was consummated on April 23, 2009. The new owners had the FCC change the call sign to WQHC to match the "Queen of Heaven" branding on March 16, 2009.

As of December 2009, WQHC was back on the air with special temporary authorization from the FCC, broadcasting with 10 watts of power from a whip antenna located on Alabama Highway 91, approximately one half mile from the intersection of US Highway 31 in Hanceville. The FCC granted an extension to the special arrangement with the 10 watt whip antenna in June 2010; the request only indicated the station was in "initial talks" with landowners of a couple possible sites.

The station's license was assigned to Fatima Family Apostolate International, Inc. for no consideration effective July 31, 2013.

WQHC's license was cancelled on April 2, 2020, due to the station failing to file an application for license renewal by April 1.
