= WTOH (Alabama) =

Radio station at Spring Hill College in Mobile, Alabama (1979–1997)

Mobile, Alabama; United States
- Frequency: 105.9 MHz

Ownership
- Owner: Spring Hill College

History
- First air date: 1979
- Last air date: 1997 (license canceled)
- Call sign meaning: "Top of the Hill"

Technical information
- Facility ID: 62000
- ERP: 10 watts
- Transmitter coordinates: 30°41′48″N 88°8′15″W

WTOH was a student-run radio station at Spring Hill College in Mobile, Alabama. The station broadcast from September 1974 to the early 1990s.

== History ==
In March 1977, Spring Hill, which already owned radio station WHIL-FM 91.3, filed to build a second station in Mobile. The new 10-watt station, to be operated by Spring Hill's students, went on air as WTOH in early 1979 and was conceived as a substitute for WHIL-FM, which had upgraded its power to 100,000 watts and became a public radio station coinciding with the power increase but was student-operated from signing on in 1974 to 1979. The station was licensed in March 1979 on 90.5 and approved to move to 105.9 MHz at the same power level in 1981.

WTOH had an alternative rock format for much of its history, though in the early 1990s it had begun airing jazz programs. A local punk rock band, the Vomit Spots, was created in 1985 by members of the radio station's staff. The station only operated when students were on site; in the 1991–92 school year, it broadcast 84 hours a week. The station went off the air in the early 1990s—though the license remained active into 1997.
