= WYDK =

Eufaula, Alabama; United States
- Broadcast area: Eufaula, Alabama
- Frequency: 97.9 MHz
- Branding: Rewind 97.9

Programming
- Format: Defunct (formerly classic hits)

Ownership
- Owner: Jeff Kierce; (JDK Radio, LLC)

History
- First air date: 1992 (as WDMT)
- Last air date: February 2021
- Former call signs: WDMT (1991–2001); WRVX (2001–2011)

Technical information
- Licensing authority: FCC
- Facility ID: 15939
- Class: A
- ERP: 6,000 watts
- HAAT: 100 meters (330 ft)
- Transmitter coordinates: 31°56′04″N 85°12′27″W

Links
- Public license information: Public file; LMS

WYDK (97.9 FM) was an American radio station licensed to serve Eufaula, Alabama, United States. The station was established in 1992 and underwent several shifts in ownership in its three decades of operation. The station's broadcast license was last held by JDK Radio, LLC. Before its shutdown, WYDK carried a classic hits format.

== History ==
In 1989, Devaughn Toole and Mary L. Toole applied to the Federal Communications Commission (FCC) for a construction permit for a new broadcast radio station. The FCC granted this permit on January 18, 1991, with a scheduled expiration date of July 18, 1992. The new station was assigned call sign WDMT on February 22, 1991. After construction and testing were completed in April 1992, the station was granted its broadcast license on July 29, 1992.

In August 1995, Devaughn Toole and Mary L. Toole applied to the FCC to transfer the WDMT broadcast license to a new company called WDMT-FM, Inc. The Commission approved the transfer on September 7, 1995. Just over two years later, in December 1997, WDMT-FM, Inc., reached an agreement to sell WDMT to Renegade Broadcasting, LLC. The FCC approved the deal on January 27, 1998, and the transaction was formally consummated on February 28, 1998. The station's call sign was changed to WRVX on March 16, 2001.

After an aborted attempt to sell WRVX to Worldwide Petromoly, Inc. (d/b/a Small Town Radio, Inc.) in June 2002 for $425,000 in cash and debt assumption, Renegade Broadcasting, LLC, applied to the FCC to transfer the station to River Valley Media, LLC in December 2002. Both companies were owned by the same people and the "sale" of the station was for a token $10. The transfer was approved by the FCC on February 3, 2003, and the transaction was formally consummated three weeks later on February 24, 2003.

In January 2007, WRVX and sister station WULA (also now defunct) were sold as a group by River Valley Media, LLC, to Big Fish Broadcasting, LLC, for a combined sale price of $350,000. The deal was approved on June 29, 2007, and the transaction was formally consummated on May 4, 2007.

Big Fish Broadcasting filed an application with the FCC in June 2011 to transfer ownership of WRVX plus sister stations WULA, WROP, and WJES to Sound Ideas, LLC, a company owned by Stanley Griffin, the managing member of Big Fish Broadcasting, LLC. In the station's FCC filing, they asserted that this transfer was requested to avoid bank foreclosure on these stations. As of September 11, 2011, the Commission had accepted this filing but had taken no further action on the request.

The station was assigned new call sign WYDK by the FCC on August 4, 2011. On March 13, 2016, Big Fish Broadcasting entered into a time broadcast agreement with Daystar Media Group, LLC whereby the principals of Daystar Media Group would manage and program WYDK and sister station WNRA (now WULA).

On August 28, 2016, WYDK went silent.

In late June 2019, WYDK returned to the air with classic hits as "Rewind 97.9" under new ownership. The station was now owned by Jeff Kierce's JDK Radio, LLC. JDK purchased all new equipment for the station including a brand new Gates Air transmitter to get the station back on the air.

On October 17, 2022, the FCC cancelled the station's license, due to it reportedly being silent since February 2021.
