= WTBJ =

- Oxford, Alabama; United States
- Frequency: 91.3 MHz
- Branding: Truth Radio

Programming
- Format: Christian
- Affiliations: USA Radio Network

Ownership
- Owner: Trinity Christian Academy
- Sister stations: WTBB

History
- First air date: May 29, 1994
- Call sign meaning: Where Truth Brings Joy

Technical information
- Licensing authority: FCC
- Facility ID: 68099
- Class: A
- ERP: 170 watts
- HAAT: 481 meters (1,578 ft)
- Transmitter coordinates: 33°29′07″N 85°48′33″W

Links
- Public license information: Public file; LMS
- Webcast: Listen Live
- Website: wtbj.org

WTBJ (91.3 FM) is a radio station broadcasting a Christian format. Licensed to Oxford, Alabama, United States, the station is currently owned by Trinity Christian Academy which is a ministry of Trinity Baptist Church whose current pastor is Dr. C. O. Grinstead. WTBJ broadcasts live on the internet using Shoutcast digital audio streaming. Top-of-the-hour news is licensed from USA Radio Network.

== Simulcast ==
The station is simulcast on WTBB 89.9 FM in Gadsden, Alabama.

Call sign	Frequency	City of license	FID	ERP (W)	HAAT	Class	FCC info
WTBB	89.9 FM	Gadsden, Alabama	82705	4,800	157 m (515 ft)	C3	LMS
