= WLJS-FM =

- Jacksonville, Alabama; United States
- Broadcast area: Jacksonville State University
- Frequency: 91.9 FM
- Branding: 92J

Programming
- Format: Public and college radio
- Affiliations: NPR

Ownership
- Owner: Board of Trustees, Jacksonville State University

History
- First air date: September 29, 1975
- Call sign meaning: We Love Jacksonville State

Technical information
- Licensing authority: FCC
- Facility ID: 4300
- Class: A
- ERP: 610 watts
- HAAT: 312 meters (1,024 ft)
- Transmitter coordinates: 33°50′12″N 85°43′59″W

Links
- Public license information: Public file; LMS
- Webcast: Listen live
- Website: wljs919.com

WLJS-FM (91.9 FM, "92J") is the student-run non-commercial educational college radio station of Jacksonville State University. The station was established for the purpose of giving students an environment in which they could learn to be radio broadcasters. WLJS is maintained by the JSU Department of Communication, which is also the parent organization of the campus newspaper, The Chanticleer, and the Mimosa yearbook. WLJS-FM's studios are located inside the first floor of Self Hall, home to JSU's Department of Communication, on the campus of JSU on Pelham Road North in northern Jacksonville.

== Programming ==
WLJS-FM was first chartered on September 29, 1975, and operated under the branding "92-J". Broadcasting at 6,000 watts, the station is an auxiliary National Public Radio member station which provides the university and surrounding communities with news and music programming, and is the flagship station for all JSU major sporting events. In that capacity, the station broadcasts JSU football, baseball, softball, men's and women's basketball. In 2009 WLJS re-branded the station as "WLJS 91.9 FM - Your Cure for the Common Radio". Today WLJS offers a variety of programming including musical genres of Rock, Country, Rap, R&B, Hip Hop, and the only station in North East Alabama to offer Metal to their listeners. WLJS prides itself on diversity in programming. Today the station still operates at 91.9 FM as well as 98.1 and 102.1 covering the cities of Anniston and Gadsden as well. With the addition of the translator towers WLJS has one of the largest footprints in North East Alabama.

From 6:00 am until 8:00 am the station plays "Morning Edition" from NPR-National Public Radio. At 8:00 am the station shifts to current music programming. The programming is primarily done through a new automation system with a few student shows at various times. The bulk of student programming comes in the afternoons and prime time. Some current shows include a sports talk show "The Scrimmage", a concept talk show in "Left Brain, Right Brain", an EDM show called "The Drop" and a morning show called "Good Morning Gamecocks". Many students have continued a career in broadcasting after college. Some of these include Jock Burgess and Courtney Ray (Buchanan) at Oxford's WVOK, Monica Nabors Phillips at Mix 102.9, Cortez Etchinson aka Ace Twon at 95.7 Jams, and most notable alums are Rick Burgess and Bill "Bubba" Bussey of "The Rick and Bubba Show"; who are syndicated throughout the country.

== Awards ==
2011 - Nominated for Most Improved Station by College Music Journal

2011 - Voted #1 Rock Station in Alabama by www.plugrooster.com

2011 - Voted #1 Rock Station in US by www.plugrooster.com

== See also ==
- List of college radio stations in the United States
