= WIZB =

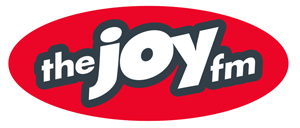
- Abbeville, Alabama; United States
- Broadcast area: Dothan, Alabama
- Frequency: 94.3 MHz
- Branding: The Joy FM

Programming
- Format: Contemporary Christian

Ownership
- Owner: Radio Training Network, Inc.

History
- First air date: February 22, 1968 (as WARI-FM)
- Former call signs: WARI-FM (1968–1976); WXLE (1976–1985); WIZB-FM (1986); WXLE (1986)

Technical information
- Licensing authority: FCC
- Facility ID: 23615
- Class: C3
- ERP: 19,500 watts
- HAAT: 113 meters (371 feet)
- Transmitter coordinates: 31°26′19.6″N 85°17′19.6″W
- Translator: 96.1 W241CB (Dothan)

Links
- Public license information: Public file; LMS
- Webcast: Listen Live
- Website: alabama.thejoyfm.com

WIZB (94.3 FM, "The Joy FM 94.3") (formerly branded as "His Radio") is a Christian radio station licensed to serve Abbeville, Alabama, United States. The station is owned by Radio Training Network, Inc. It broadcasts a Contemporary Christian format to the Dothan, Alabama, area.

The station also broadcasts its signal on a translator at 96.1 MHz inside the Ross Clark Circle in Dothan to improve its signal within the city.

== History ==
WIZB started as WARI-FM on February 22, 1968, as the sister station to WARI/1480. It changed callsigns to WXLE in 1976. In August 1985, Henry County Radio, Inc., reached an agreement to sell WXLE to Abbeville Wireless Corporation. The deal was approved by the Federal Communications Commission on October 2, 1985, and the transaction was consummated on January 7, 1986.

The station was assigned the WIZB call letters by the FCC on April 2, 1986.

In July 1994, Abbeville Wireless Corporation reached an agreement to sell this station to Genesis Radio Company, Inc. The deal was approved by the FCC on November 8, 1994, and the transaction was consummated on November 25, 1994.

In March 2005, Celebration Communications Company, Inc. (Art Morris, acting chairman) reached an agreement to sell this station to Radio Training Network, Inc. (James L. Campbell, president/CEO) for a reported $288,416. The deal was approved by the FCC on April 29, 2005, and the transaction was consummated on May 26, 2005.

== Programs ==
- Dr David Jeremiah 4a-4:30a
- Dr Charles Stanley 4:30a-5a
- The Morning Cruise - weekday mornings from 5-9a
- Talkin' with Terris - weekdays from 9a-3p
- Russ & Nancy - weekdays 3-7p
- Evenings with Dan - weekdays 7-11p
- Toni - weekdays 11p-4a
- Saturdays, Earl 6-10a, Toni 10-2p, Earl 2-6p, Donna Cruz 6p-12a
- Sundays, Warm Up To Worship 5-9a, Churches 9a-12p, Nancy 12-3p, Misty 3-6p Donna Cruz 6p-11p
