= WGSV =

Radio station in Guntersville, Alabama

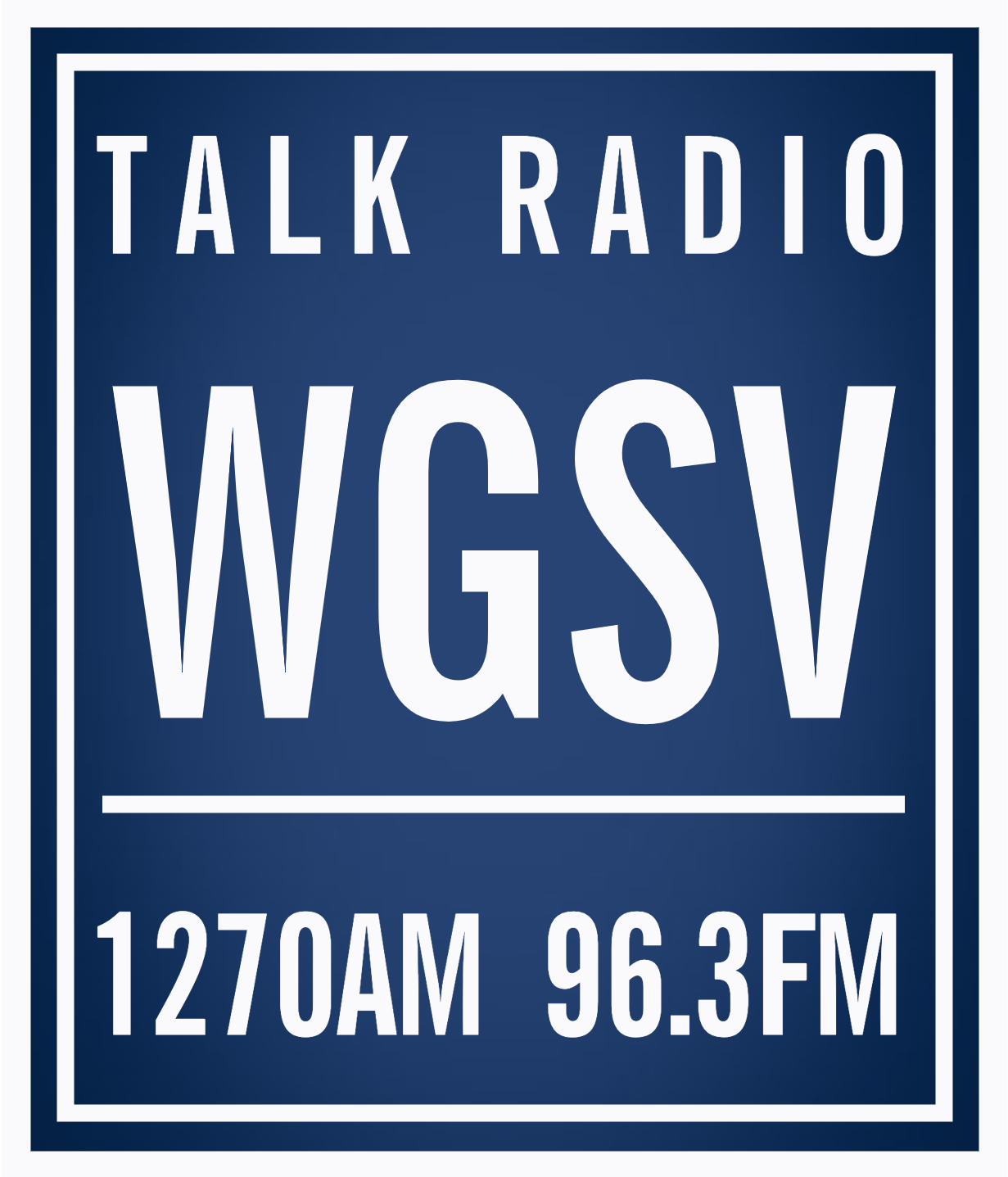
- Guntersville, Alabama; United States
- Frequency: 1270 kHz

Programming
- Format: News/talk
- Affiliations: Premiere Networks; Westwood One

Ownership
- Owner: Guntersville Broadcasting Company, Inc.

History
- First air date: April 16, 1950
- Call sign meaning: GunterSVille

Technical information
- Licensing authority: FCC
- Facility ID: 25675
- Class: D
- Power: 1,000 watts day 124 watts night
- Transmitter coordinates: 34°18′31″N 86°17′44″W
- Translator: 96.3 W242CO (Guntersville)

Links
- Public license information: Public file; LMS
- Webcast: Listen Live
- Website: www.wgsv.com

WGSV (1270 AM) is a radio station licensed to serve Guntersville, Alabama. The station is owned by Guntersville Broadcasting Company, Inc. It airs a news/talk format.

The station was granted the WGSV call sign by the Federal Communications Commission.

== Programming ==
Local programming includes a "Swap Shop" show called Tell Me How. Notable syndicated programming includes shows hosted by Sean Hannity, Dan Bongino, Sebastian Gorka, Bill O'Reilly (political commentator) and Kim Komando. Overnight, the station broadcasts the syndicated Coast to Coast AM hosted by George Noory. The station also broadcasts the syndicated Saturday night program Somewhere In Time hosted by Art Bell. The station began carrying The Rush Limbaugh Show near its inception and did so for 30 years. The station in mid to late 2016 added an FM translator on 96.3 MHz.
