= WVOK-FM =

Radio station in Oxford–Anniston, Alabama

Coordinates: 33.622°N 85.872°W

- Ohatchee, Alabama; United States
- Broadcast area: Anniston-Oxford Metropolitan Area
- Frequency: 97.9 MHz
- Branding: 97.9 VOK

Programming
- Format: Hot Adult Contemporary

Ownership
- Owner: Woodard Broadcasting Co.
- Sister stations: WTAZ

History
- First air date: February 19, 1990
- Former call signs: WKFN (1989–1992); WVOK (1992–2002)

Technical information
- Licensing authority: FCC
- Class: A
- ERP: 510 watts
- HAAT: 338 meters (1,109 ft)

Links
- Public license information: Public file; LMS
- Webcast: Listen live
- Website: 979wvok.com

WVOK-FM (97.9 FM, "97.9 VOK") is a commercial radio station licensed to Ohatchee, Alabama, United States, and serving the Anniston-Oxford Metropolitan Area. Owned by Woodard Broadcasting Company, Inc., it broadcasts a hot adult contemporary format with studios on Church Street in Oxford.

The transmitter is off Coldwater Mountain Road in Anniston.

== History ==
=== WVOK in Birmingham and Oxford ===
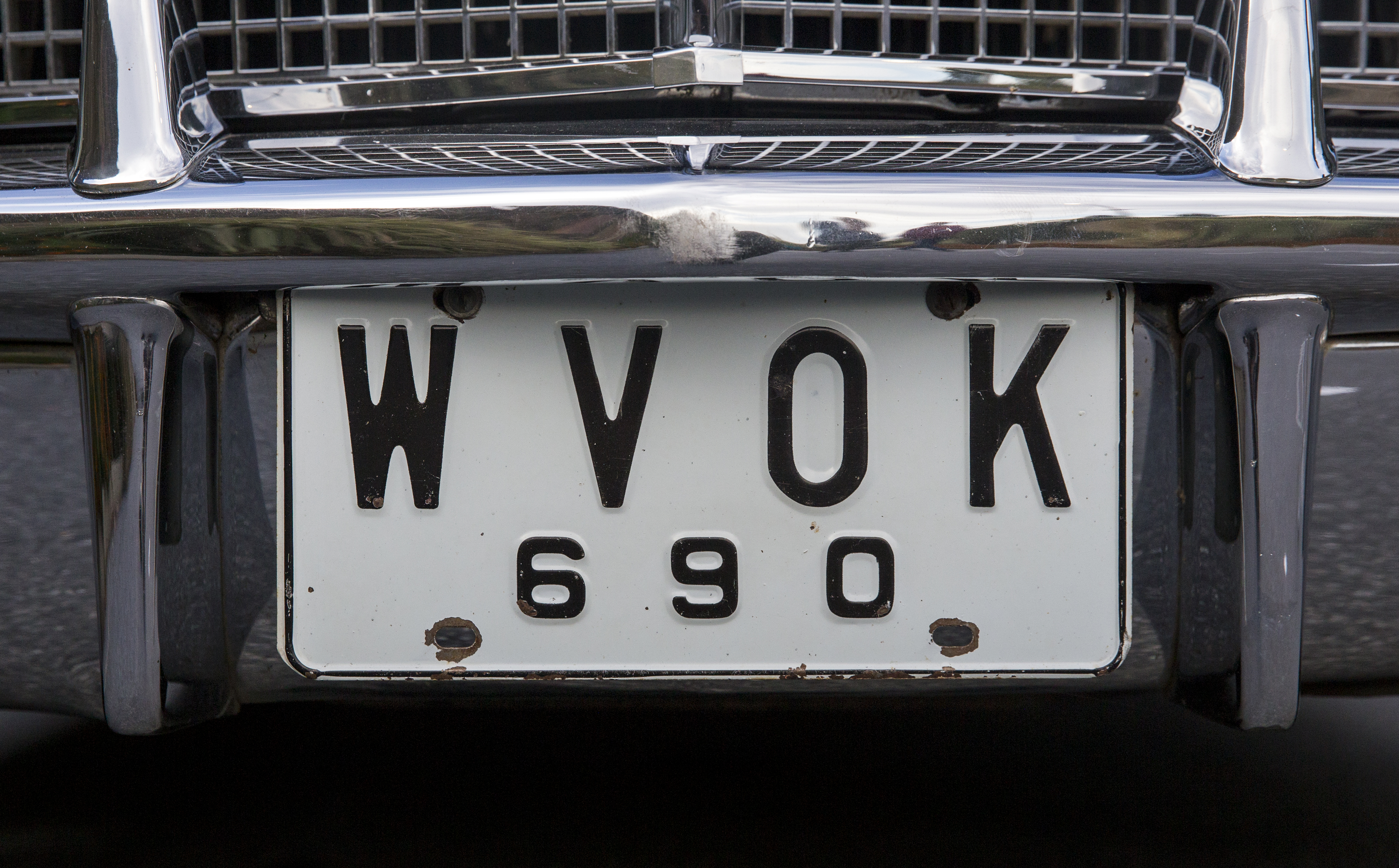
WVOK was originally on AM 690

In 1977, WVOK-FM was launched in Birmingham, Alabama, as an album-oriented rock (AOR) radio station called "K-99." The station broadcast on the 99.5 MHz frequency, originally the sister station to WVOK 690 AM (now WJOX). WVOK 690 was a popular Top 40 stations. WVOK-FM changed its call letters to WRKK in 1979. It kept its Rock format until 1983, when it became country music station "K Country." Several format changes later, the station is now known in Birmingham as WZRR "Talk 99.5."

The WVOK call sign would not be heard on the FM dial again until the creation of a new radio station in Oxford, Alabama. Jimmy and Geraldine Woodard, owners of WEYY-FM in Talladega, Alabama, were granted a construction permit from the FCC for the first commercial FM station licensed to Oxford. The station signed on the air on February 19, 1990. At first, it was WKFN "K98" on the 97.9 MHz frequency. In 1992, WKFN acquired the WVOK call letters but its "K98" nickname remained the same.

=== Recent history ===
On February 19, 1990, the station made a change. K98 switched to an Adult Contemporary format, playing music from the 1950s through the 1990s. At that time, WVOK was one of few local stations to compete against the 100,000-watt Country music station WHMA of in Anniston, known by listeners as "Alabama 100."

On November 6, 1996, the Susquehanna Radio Corporation purchased Alabama 100 and moved it to the Atlanta radio market in early 2001. As a result, WVOK saw an increase in the station's local Arbitron ratings.

Since K98 began broadcast in 1990, it has employed a number of popular DJs, including Rick Burgess from the syndicated "Rick and Bubba" radio program. K98's radio format, however, has seen little change. Clear Channel Communications station WQEN ("103-7 the Q") relocated its transmitter from Springville, Alabama, to Birmingham in early 2005. That prompted WVOK to briefly changed its music format to Contemporary Hit Radio (Top 40 - CHR). But that was short-lived. WVOK has since returned to a more adult-appeal Hot AC format.

In early 2006, WVOK-FM began using its frequency and call letters often (instead of the "K98" nickname) as its station identifier. Its slogan became "The Best of the 80's, 90's and Today". In early 2008, it added a new morning program, The Steve and Carl Show.

Former logo

=== Other facts ===
- WVOK-FM is recognized as one of the only radio stations in Alabama to remain on the air during the "Storm of the Century" in 1993. WVOK received honors from the city of Oxford, former Alabama Governor Guy Hunt, and others for keeping the station on the air through the duration of the storm.
- WVOK-FM is one of two stations in the Anniston/Gadsden market whose call letters were previously assigned to Top 40 stations in Birmingham. The other is WKXX.
- There has been much speculation about the WVOK call sign meaning over the years. Although DJs from the original WVOK-AM radio station sometimes referred to it as the Voice Of Kindness, the call letters were randomly chosen.
