= WGMZ =

- Glencoe, Alabama; United States
- Broadcast area: Gadsden, Alabama
- Frequency: 93.1 MHz (HD Radio)
- Branding: Classic Hits Z93.1

Programming
- Format: Classic hits

Ownership
- Owner: iHeartMedia; (iHM Licenses, LLC)
- Sister stations: WAAX

History
- First air date: 1994
- Former call signs: WZJV (1992–1993)

Technical information
- Licensing authority: FCC
- Facility ID: 2465
- Class: A
- ERP: 1,650 watts
- HAAT: 189 meters (620 ft)
- Transmitter coordinates: 33°57′16″N 85°51′40″W

Links
- Public license information: Public file; LMS
- Webcast: Listen live (via iHeartRadio)
- Website: wgmz.iheart.com/

WGMZ (93.1 FM) is a radio station licensed to Glencoe, Alabama, United States. WGMZ serves the Gadsden, Alabama, and Anniston, Alabama, metropolitan areas. The station is owned by San Antonio–based iHeartMedia and licensed to iHM Licenses, LLC. It broadcasts a classic hits music format.

== History ==
The station was assigned the WGMZ call letters by the Federal Communications Commission on June 15, 1993. Prior to that, the call letters were used in the Flint, Michigan, market on several stations, notably on what is now WCRZ from 1961 to 1984.

WGMZ dropped Top 40 for the Target Radio Satellite Networks adult alternative format "theLYTE".

In 2006, WGMZ (Z-93.1) hired morning popular talents Rick Sisk and Dennis Deason and shifted Wild Bill Seckbach from AM to PM drive. WGMZ's primary coverage area includes Etowah and Calhoun counties (Gadsden/Anniston, AL)
