= WGRW =

- Anniston, Alabama; United States
- Broadcast area: Gadsden, Alabama
- Frequency: 90.7 MHz
- Branding: Grace Radio

Programming
- Format: Contemporary Christian
- Affiliations: Moody Broadcasting Network; Salem Radio Network

Ownership
- Owner: Word Works, Inc.

History
- First air date: June 30, 1999
- Call sign meaning: GR = Grace Radio

Technical information
- Licensing authority: FCC
- Facility ID: 79043
- Class: A
- ERP: 3,000 watts
- HAAT: 100 meters (328 feet)
- Transmitter coordinates: 33°46′41″N 85°56′38″W

Links
- Public license information: Public file; LMS
- Website: graceradio.com

WGRW (90.7 FM) is a non-commercial radio station licensed to serve Anniston, Alabama, United States. The station is owned by Word Works, Inc.

== Programming ==
WGRW broadcasts a Contemporary Christian music format to the Anniston and Gadsden, Alabama, area. The station derives a portion of its programming from the Moody Broadcasting Network and the Salem Radio Network.

Jon Holder, station manager and host of Grace in the Morning, has been with WGRW since it launched in 1999. Holder had previously worked at WDNG, also in Anniston.

== History ==
This station's original construction permit was granted by the Federal Communications Commission on September 12, 1996. The new station was assigned the WGRW call letters by the FCC on October 25, 1996. On June 25, 1999, WGRW received its license to cover from the FCC.
