= WZZX =

Radio station in Lineville, Alabama (1967–2016)

- Lineville, Alabama; United States
- Frequency: 780 kHz

Programming
- Format: Defunct (formerly urban contemporary)

Ownership
- Owner: Williams Communications Inc.

History
- First air date: 1967
- Last air date: August 1, 2016 (date of license surrender)
- Former call signs: WANL (1967–1983)
- Former frequencies: 1540 kHz (1967–1985)

Technical information
- Facility ID: 56745
- Class: D
- Power: 5,000 watts (day only)
- Transmitter coordinates: 33°18′22″N 85°44′42″W

WZZX (780 AM) was a radio station licensed to serve Lineville, Alabama. The station was owned by Williams Communications Inc. It last aired an urban music format, simulcasting sister station WFXO.

== History ==
The station was assigned the WZZX call letters by the Federal Communications Commission in 1983, replacing the earlier WANL designation in use from 1967 to 1983.

WZZX's license was cancelled at the licensee's request by letter dated August 1, 2016, although the FCC did not receive the letter until September 26, 2017 (and, therefore, the cancellation did not occur until then).
