= Oxford City Schools =

School district in Alabama, United States

Oxford City School District is a school district in Calhoun County, Alabama.

The mascot is the Yellow Jackets. Dr. Shannon Stanley serves as the superintendent, a position she has held since 2022.

== Board Members ==
- Don Hopper
- Cristy Humphries
- Alex Davenport
- Karen Phillips
- Tony Bolton
- Marvin Jones

== Schools ==
Oxford Elementary School

Address: 1401 Caffey Drive Oxford, AL 36203

Principal Claire Gamble

DeArmanville Elementary School

Address: 170 School Road Oxford, AL 36207

Principal: Amy Copeland

Coldwater Elementary School

Address: 530 Taylors Chapel Road Anniston, AL 36201

Principal: Dr. Catherine Finkley

CE Hanna Elementary School

Address: 1111 Watson Drive Oxford, AL 36203

Principal: Brian McRae

Oxford Middle School

Grade Level: 7-8

Address: 1750 U.S. Highway 78 W Oxford, AL 36203

Principal: Phillip Morrison

Oxford High School

Address: #1 Yellow Jacket Drive Oxford, AL 36203

Principal: Heath Harmon
