= WVVL =

- Elba, Alabama; United States
- Broadcast area: Enterprise, Alabama
- Frequency: 101.1 MHz
- Branding: Retro FM

Programming
- Format: Classic hits

Ownership
- Owner: JetStream Media of Alabama, LLC

History
- First air date: 1987
- Former call signs: WZTZ (1986–2006, 2022–2026); WVVL (2006–2022)
- Call sign meaning: Weevil, as in the boll weevil

Technical information
- Licensing authority: FCC
- Facility ID: 19141
- Class: A
- ERP: 1,400 watts
- HAAT: 208 meters (682 ft)
- Transmitter coordinates: 31°24′41″N 85°57′32″W

Links
- Public license information: Public file; LMS
- Webcast: Listen live
- Website: retrofmenterprise.com

WVVL (101.1 FM, "Retro FM") is a radio station licensed to serve Elba, Alabama, United States. The station is owned by JetStream Media of Alabama, LLC, and broadcasts a classic hits format.

The station received its original construction permit from the Federal Communications Commission (FCC) on July 2, 1986. The new station was assigned the call sign WZTZ on July 17, 1986. WZTZ received its license to cover on November 19, 1987.

The station changed call signs to WVVL on June 1, 2006, and broadcast as Weevil 101 with a classic country format. At that time, the station moved from Elba to downtown Enterprise.

On March 8, 2021, WVVL changed its format from classic country to a simulcast of sports-formatted WOOF (560 AM) from Dothan, branded as "The Ball".

On August 22, 2022, WVVL changed its call letters back to the original WZTZ and began a mostly 1970s and 1980s classic hits format, branded as Z101.

On August 16, 2025, at 2:00 PM local time, under a local marketing agreement with JetStream Media of Alabama, LLC, WZTZ relaunched the classic hits format as "101.1 Retro FM", moving to a playlist of music from the 1980s to the 2000s. WZTZ was sold to JetStream Media upon FCC approval. It changed call signs back to WVVL on July 6, 2026.
