= WJHO =

Coordinates: 33.2083°N 85.9919°W

- Alexander City, Alabama; United States
- Broadcast area: Alexander City, Alabama; Talladega, Alabama; Lineville, Alabama; Sylacauga, Alabama
- Frequency: 89.7 MHz
- Branding: The Inspiration Station

Programming
- Format: Contemporary Christian

Ownership
- Owner: Radioalabama Inc.

History
- First air date: 2008
- Call sign meaning: John Herbert Orr

Technical information
- Licensing authority: FCC
- Facility ID: 121797
- Class: C2
- ERP: 21,000 watts
- HAAT: 147 meters (482 ft)

Links
- Public license information: Public file; LMS
- Webcast: Listen live
- Website: www.radioalabama.net/897wjho/

WJHO is a radio station airing a Contemporary Christian format, licensed to Alexander City, Alabama, broadcasting on 89.7 FM. The station is owned by Lee Perryman's Radioalabama Inc.

In January 2022 WJHO changed their format from Christian rock/rap to classic rock, branded as "89.7 The Classic".

In 2024 WJHO changed their format to contemporary Christian, branded as "The Inspiration Station".
