= WYVC =

- Camden, Alabama; United States
- Frequency: 102.3 MHz

Programming
- Format: Gospel

Ownership
- Owner: Down Home Broadcasting

History
- First air date: 1990; May 2013 (relaunch)
- Last air date: April 6, 2012

Technical information
- Licensing authority: FCC
- Facility ID: 17481
- Class: A
- ERP: 6,000 watts
- HAAT: 96 meters (315 ft)
- Transmitter coordinates: 31°57′17.50″N 87°15′50.90″W

Links
- Public license information: Public file; LMS

WYVC (102.3 FM) is a radio station licensed to serve Camden, Alabama. The station is owned by Down Home Broadcasting. It airs an Urban Gospel music format.

The station was assigned the WYVC call letters by the Federal Communications Commission on January 31, 2007.

The station's broadcast license expired on April 1, 2004, after the station failed to file a timely license renewal. After legal actions and discussions with the FCC, the station's license was cancelled and the callsign deleted from the FCC database on June 24, 2005. A deal was then reached for the station to pay its regulatory fees and re-apply for its broadcast license. However, in 2007 the FCC learned that the station had not stopped broadcasting after its license was cancelled and issued a notice of apparent liability for $14,000 in new fines. After roughly five years of back and forth with the license holder, the FCC determined that the fines would not be paid. The station again failed to renew its license and it expired on April 1, 2012. On April 6, 2012, the station's license was cancelled and its callsign deleted from the FCC's database.

The license (For WYVC) was re-instated in May 2013. (Taken from Alabama Broadcast Media Page)

In 'August 2015, WYVC started broadcasting in Stereo.
