= WULA =

- Eufaula, Alabama; United States
- Broadcast area: Eufaula, Alabama
- Frequency: 1240 kHz

Programming
- Format: Defunct

History
- First air date: 1948
- Former call signs: WULA (1948–2011); WNRA (2011–2016)
- Call sign meaning: W EufaULA

Technical information
- Facility ID: 36308
- Class: C
- Power: 600 watts (unlimited)
- Transmitter coordinates: 31°54′30″N 85°09′51″W

WULA (1240 AM) was a radio station licensed to serve Eufaula, Alabama. The station was last owned by JDK Radio, LLC.

== History ==
The station began broadcasting in 1948, holding the call sign WULA, and was owned by Alabama-Georgia Broadcasters.

The station was assigned the WNRA call letters by the Federal Communications Commission on August 26, 2011. On April 12, 2016, the station changed its call sign back to its historical WULA. WULA was no longer under the programming control of Dave or Berniece Hedrick. On March 15, 2016, Dwayne and Kaitlin Lee of Daystar Media Group LLC entered into an LMA/TBA (Time Brokerage Agreement) with Licensee Stanley Griffin of Sound Ideas (formerly Big Fish).

AM 1240 WULA was home to both PRN and MRN racing, Salem Radio Network, Bill Gaither Homecoming, Front Porch Fellowship, and a plethora of local Christian and Sports programming. It was also the official home of Eufaula High School Athletics and Alabama Crimson Tide, while its sister station WYDK 97.9 FM hosted Auburn.

On September 2, 2016, WULA went silent. Its license was cancelled on September 12, 2019.
