= WLWI =

WLWI may refer to:

- WLWI (AM), a radio station (1440 AM) licensed to Montgomery, Alabama, United States
- WLWI-FM, a radio station (92.3 FM) licensed to Montgomery, Alabama, United States
- WLWI (or WLW-I), the original call letters of the television station now known as WTHR (Channel 13) licensed to Indianapolis, Indiana, United States
