= WLWI (AM) =

- Montgomery, Alabama; United States
- Frequency: 1440 kHz
- Branding: News Radio 1440

Programming
- Format: News/talk
- Affiliations: CBS News Radio; Premiere Networks; Westwood One

Ownership
- Owner: Cumulus Media; (Cumulus Licensing LLC)
- Sister stations: WHHY-FM; WLWI-FM; WMSP; WMXS; WXFX

History
- First air date: March 31, 1930
- Last air date: March 14, 2025
- Former call signs: WSFA (1930–1957); WHHY (1957–1999)

Technical information
- Licensing authority: FCC
- Facility ID: 66909
- Class: B
- Power: 5,000 watts day; 1,000 watts night
- Transmitter coordinates: 32°18′24.5″N 86°16′34.9″W
- Repeater: 95.1 WXFX-HD3 (Prattville)

Links
- Public license information: Public file; LMS

WLWI (1440 kHz, "News Radio 1440") was an AM radio station licensed to serve Montgomery, Alabama, United States. The station was owned by Cumulus Media and the license was held by Cumulus Licensing, LLC. The WLWI studios were located on the third floor of The Colonial Financial Center in downtown Montgomery, and the transmitter tower was in Montgomery's southside.

Prior to going silent in March 2025, WLWI broadcast a news/talk format to the Montgomery metropolitan area. Notable local programming included "Decisions" with retired Army Sergeant Kevin Elkins and "Tactics" with former national debate champion and minister Caleb Colquitt. Notable syndicated programming included Mark Levin, Rush Limbaugh, The Sean Hannity Show, The Daily Wire, and Michael Savage. Overnight, the station broadcast the syndicated Red Eye Radio. The station also carried all 140 games of the local Minor League Baseball team the Montgomery Biscuits.

== History ==
=== The beginning ===
This station, the oldest radio station in Montgomery and the fourth oldest in Alabama, began broadcasting as WSFA on March 31, 1930. Montgomery's next oldest, WCOV (now WGMP), did not begin broadcasting until February 1939. The radio station's callsign, intended to promote Montgomery's city air field, stood for "With the South's Finest Airport". A formerly-affiliated Montgomery television station (then WSFA-TV, now simply WSFA) still holds this historic callsign.

WSFA was originally operated under the ownership of the Montgomery Broadcasting Company, Inc., a partnership between local businessmen Howard Pill and Gordon Persons. Persons, who stepped down as president of the company in 1939, would go on to serve as the forty-third governor of Alabama from 1951 to 1955.

Country music legend Hank Williams got his start as a professional musician in 1936 with regular appearances on WSFA. It was during this period that he formed his longtime backing band, the Drifting Cowboys. Southern Gospel family group the Speer Family joined the station in 1941 until they moved on to Nashville, Tennessee, in 1946.

=== The WHHY era ===
The station was acquired by Broadcast Service of Montgomery, Inc., under the ownership of Charles W. Holt, Connie I. Holt, and Robert N. Robinson, as part of the Holt Broadcasting Service, on January 9, 1957. The station was renamed WHHY to match the other stations owned by Holt Broadcasting at the time: WHSY in Hattiesburg, Mississippi, WHNY in McComb, Mississippi, WHXY in Bogalusa, Louisiana, and KOME in Tulsa, Oklahoma.

The Holt and Robinson families maintained ownership of the WHHY until Holt-Robinson Communications encountered financial difficulties and was placed into receivership. The license for WHHY was involuntarily transferred to receiver Thomas M. Duddy in May 1993. The transfer was approved by the Federal Communications Commission (FCC) on June 21, 1993.

In May 1995, Duddy reached an agreement to sell this station to McDonald Investment Company, Inc. The deal was approved by the FCC on July 3, 1995, and the transaction was consummated on August 30, 1995. In October 1996, McDonald Investment Company, Inc., applied to the FCC to transfer the license for this station to McDonald Media Group, Inc. The deal was approved by the FCC on November 7, 1996, and the transaction was consummated on December 2, 1996.

=== The WLWI era ===
Known as WHHY since 1957, the station changed call letters to the current WLWI on October 19, 1999. In December 1999, McDonald Media Group, Inc., made a deal to sell this station to Citation Limited Partnership, owned by Citation Cablevision, Inc. The deal was approved by the FCC on December 17, 1999, and the transaction was consummated on January 20, 2000.

In September 2000, Citation Limited Partnership reached an agreement to sell this station to Cumulus Media subsidiary Cumulus Licensing Corp. as part of a three station deal valued at a reported $10 million. The deal was approved by the FCC on March 12, 2001, and the transaction was consummated on May 15, 2001.

WLWI went silent in March 2025. It was one of 11 Cumulus stations to close the weekend of March 14, as part of a larger shutdown of underperforming Cumulus stations. The FCC cancelled the station's license on March 12, 2026.
