= WMKK =

WMKK may refer to:

- WMKK-LP, a radio station (99.5 FM) licensed to serve Richmond, Kentucky, United States
- WEEI-FM, a radio station (93.7 FM) licensed to serve Lawrence, Massachusetts, United States, which held the call sign WMKK from 2005 to 2011
- WHHY-FM, a radio station (101.9 FM) licensed to serve Montgomery, Alabama, United States, which held the call sign WMKK in 1996
- Kuala Lumpur International Airport (ICAO code WMKK)
