= Capital City Street Railway =

Railway in Montgomery, Alabama

Lightning Route
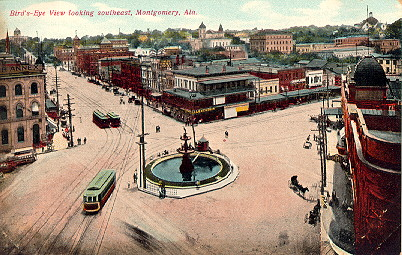
- A view of three Lightning Route streetcars on a postcard from 1900–1920

Overview
- Locale: Montgomery, Alabama
- Transit type: Streetcar

Operation
- Began operation: April 1885 (horsecars); April 15, 1886 (electric)
- Ended operation: April 15, 1936

Technical
- Electrification: Overhead line

The Capital City Street Railway, also known as the Lightning Route, was the first citywide system of streetcars established in Montgomery, Alabama, on April 15, 1886. This early technology was developed by the Belgian-American inventor Charles Joseph Van Depoele. Joseph Arthur Gaboury, a French Canadian from Quebec, was the owner of the horse-drawn system that was converted to electricity. One trolley route ended at the Cloverdale neighborhood. This early public transportation system made Montgomery one of the first cities to "depopulate" its residential areas at the city center through transportation-facilitated suburban development. The system operated for exactly 50 years, until April 15, 1936, when it was retired in a big ceremony and replaced by buses.

== Beginnings as a horsecar network ==
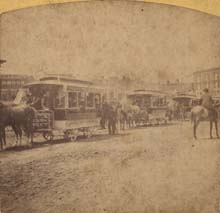
Horsecars of the Capital City Street R., c. 1880–1889

The Capital City Street Railway Company was incorporated in November 1884 in order to connect the city's Union Station to its neighborhoods via street railways. The first line opened in April 1885, running on Commerce, Dexter, and Perry. The second line began construction on the same day, and by November they were beginning work on a third. That month, the company also petitioned the city council to allow its cars to be operated by electricity.

== Adopting the Van Depoele system ==
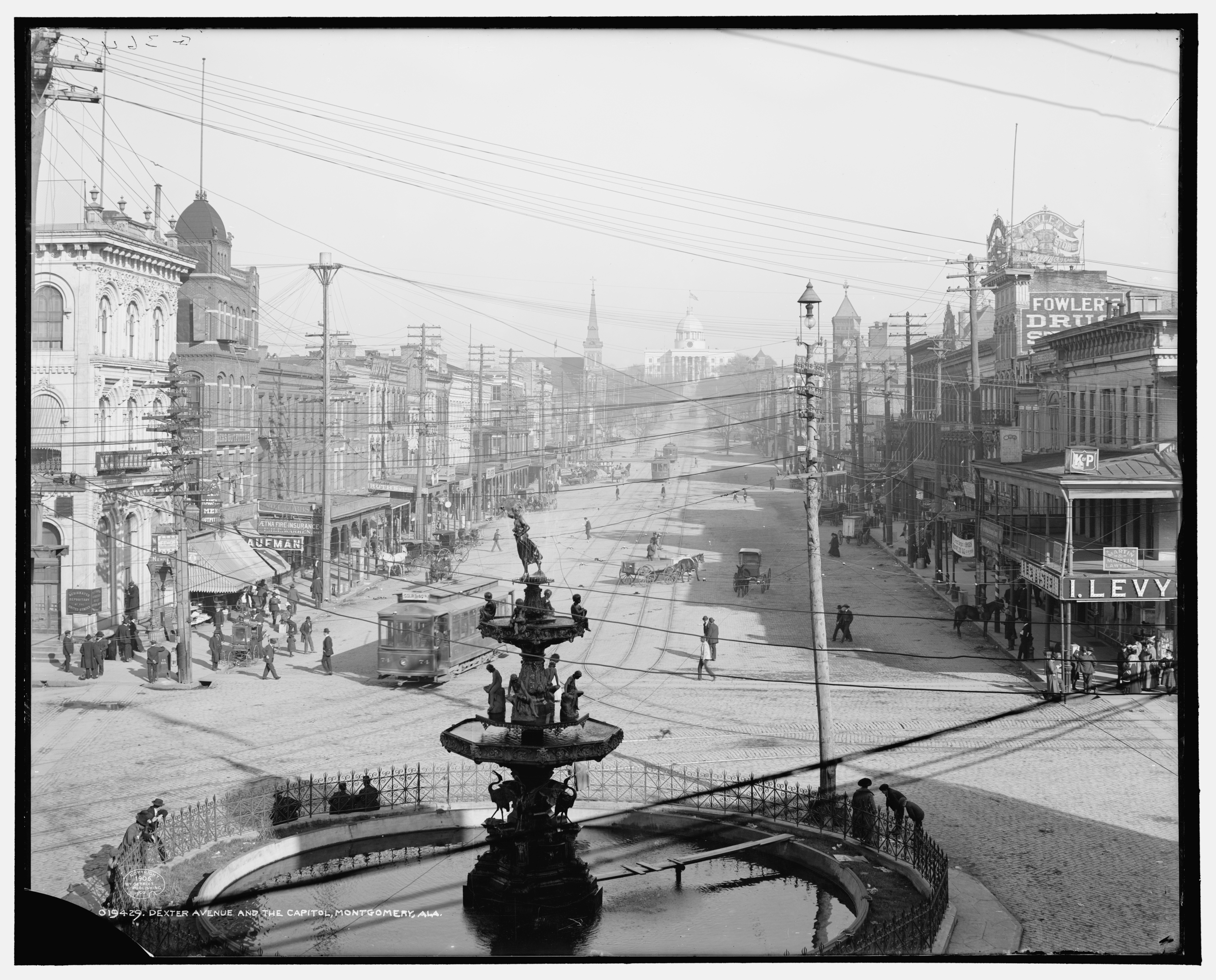
View across Court Square, 1906

The electrification of streetcar lines in Montgomery was the first time, on a large commercial scale, that the layout of under-running trolley and the modern overhead construction was utilized for a street railway. It was in the spring of 1886 that Charles Joseph Van Depoele first equipped a trial line with two cars for the company. These cars were operated for nearly 2 miles (3.2 km) on Court Street, and, by reason of their success, the Van Depoele Company was in September 1886 given a contract to equip the entire street railway system of the city. The work was immediately started, and in May of 1887 the road was opened for public business. The lines equipped included between 12 and 14 miles (19 and 23 km) of track, with numerous curves and switches, and operated fourteen cars. The trolley pole was placed near the forward end and, as the road was operated with loops or turntables, the cars and trolleys were not reversible. The overhead trolley wire was supported by cross wires, which, in some places on Commerce Street and on Dexter Avenue, were anchored to the buildings on either side. Of the fourteen cars, ten were equipped with 10 horsepower (7.5 kW) motors and four with 15 horsepower (11 kW) motors. The motor was placed at the front end of the car and geared directly to a countershaft, which in turn was connected to the axle by a sprocket chain. In this road the central power station was equipped with two generators of 250 horsepower (190 kW) each, this being a time when such large units were rare, if not practically unknown, in central station equipment in the country.

In 1887, the Montgomery Street Railroad was purchased by the Capital City Street Railway, though both systems operated independently of one another.

== Racial segregation ==
It was on this system that Montgomery's segregated racial seating was established in the early 1900s, which continued on the city buses after 1936. There was a Montgomery streetcar boycott from 1900 to 1902 to protest segregated service. However, the city council passed the Montgomery Streetcar Act in 1906 that further mandated a continuation of segregation. Segregation ended with the famous Montgomery bus boycott started by Rosa Parks and led by Rev. Martin Luther King Jr. and E. D. Nixon that lasted from December 2, 1955, to December 20, 1956.

== City ownership ==
In 1974, the City of Montgomery took over ownership of the system that was then known as the Montgomery Area Transit System or MATS. Since the centennial of the Lightning Route in 1986 there have been various initiatives to re-establish a light-rail system in Montgomery. In place of light rail a system of tourist trolleys (diesel buses) known as the Lightning Route Trolleys currently operates in the city's historic districts.

== See also ==
- Browder v. Gayle
- History of trams
- Union Station (Montgomery) - a preserved Lightning Route streetcar is housed in a building near the old railroad station.
