= WRBZ =

Radio station in Wetumpka–Montgomery, Alabama

- Wetumpka, Alabama; United States
- Broadcast area: Montgomery, Alabama
- Frequency: 1250 kHz
- Branding: 95.5 La Voz

Programming
- Format: Spanish

Ownership
- Owner: Terry Barber; (TBE, LLC)
- Sister stations: WMGY

History
- First air date: 1954
- Former call signs: WETU (1954–1985); WAPZ (1985–2011)

Technical information
- Licensing authority: FCC
- Facility ID: 29343
- Class: D
- Power: 1,000 watts day 80 watts night
- Transmitter coordinates: 32°29′6.00″N 86°12′25.00″W
- Translator: 95.5 W238CE (Montgomery)

Links
- Public license information: Public file; LMS
- Webcast: Listen Live; Listen Live via TuneIn
- Website: wrbzradio.com

WRBZ (1250 AM) is an American radio station licensed to serve the community of Wetumpka, Alabama. The station is owned by Terry Barber, through licensee TBE, LLC.

WRBZ broadcasts a Spanish language format branded as "95.5 La Voz" serving the Montgomery, Alabama, area. The FM frequency in the branding is for FM translator W238CE 95.5 FM Montgomery.

Originally licensed as "WETU", the station was assigned call sign "WAPZ" by the Federal Communications Commission (FCC) on January 1, 1985. The station was assigned the current "WRBZ" call letters by the FCC on March 15, 2011.

In March 2023 WRBZ changed their format from classic hits to a Spanish-language format, branded as "95.5 La Voz".
