= WWMG =

- Millbrook, Alabama; United States
- Broadcast area: Montgomery, Alabama
- Frequency: 97.1 MHz
- RDS: Today's R&B and Old school
- Branding: Magic 97.1

Programming
- Format: Urban adult contemporary
- Affiliations: Premiere Networks

Ownership
- Owner: iHeartMedia, Inc.; (iHM Licenses, LLC)
- Sister stations: WHLW, WZHT

History
- First air date: 1992 (as WXEF)
- Former call signs: WXEF (1992); WMCZ (1992–2004)
- Call sign meaning: W W MaGic or W W MontGomery

Technical information
- Licensing authority: FCC
- Facility ID: 8662
- Class: C3
- ERP: 5,400 watts
- HAAT: 214 meters (702 ft)
- Transmitter coordinates: 32°20′06″N 86°17′16″W

Links
- Public license information: Public file; LMS
- Webcast: Listen Live
- Website: mymagic97.iheart.com

WWMG (97.1 FM) is an urban adult contemporary music formatted radio station licensed to Millbrook, Alabama, United States. The station is known as "Magic 97.1" and serves the Montgomery, Alabama, area. It is owned by iHeartMedia, Inc., and is one-third of the all-urban Montgomery cluster, complementing mainstream urban's WZHT and urban gospel's WHLW. The studios for the three stations are located in East Montgomery near Eastdale Mall, and WWMG has a transmitter site on the property of television station WCOV-TV in the city's Normandale neighborhood.

The station has been issued a construction permit by the Federal Communications Commission to increase its effective radiated power from 1300 Watts to 5400 Watts.

== Programming ==
WWMG is the Montgomery affiliate for the Steve Harvey Morning Show (which previously aired on sister WZHT until October 2013) and the nighttime Keith Sweat Hotel. It was the former home of Tom Joyner in the mornings before being replaced by Harvey; Joyner now airs on WJWZ. Under its format, it plays R&B and Soul music from the 1960s into today's currents.

== History ==
This station used the call sign WXEF from February 2 to October 16, 1992, when it was assigned WMCZ which it held until September 16, 2004. The station then switched to WWMG, the current assigned call letters.
