= WMXS =

Radio station in Montgomery, Alabama

- Montgomery, Alabama; United States
- Frequency: 103.3 MHz
- Branding: Mix 103.3

Programming
- Format: Adult contemporary
- Affiliations: Compass Media Networks

Ownership
- Owner: Cumulus Media; (Cumulus Licensing LLC)
- Sister stations: WHHY-FM; WLWI-FM; WMSP; WXFX

History
- First air date: July 9, 1961
- Former call signs: WAJM-FM (1961–1974); WMGZ (1974–1977); WREZ-FM (1977–1987); WSYA-FM (1987–1994)
- Call sign meaning: "Mix"

Technical information
- Licensing authority: FCC
- Facility ID: 12322
- Class: C
- ERP: 100,000 watts
- HAAT: 334 meters (1,096 ft)
- Transmitter coordinates: 32°24′13″N 86°11′47″W

Links
- Public license information: Public file; LMS
- Webcast: Listen live
- Website: www.mix103.com

WMXS (103.3 FM, "Mix 103.3") is a radio station licensed to Montgomery, Alabama, United States. The station is owned by Cumulus Media and the license is held by Cumulus Licensing LLC. The WMXS studios are located on the 3rd floor of The One Commerce building in downtown Montgomery, and the transmitter tower is in Montgomery's northeast side.

It broadcasts a mainstream adult contemporary music format.

The station was assigned the WMXS call letters by the Federal Communications Commission on February 24, 1994.

== History ==
The station went on the air on July 9, 1961. Its original call letters for 103.3 were WAJM, which stood for "Advertiser-Journal Montgomery", named for the local newspaper. By 1974, it was FM sister to WMGY with the calls WMGZ, and a short-lived top-40 format using the name "Z-103". By 1977, the frequency provided the beautiful music format as WREZ until the late 1980s.

In November 1987, the station became known as WSYA, "Sunny 103" and changed to an adult contemporary format. In late 1989, WSYA briefly changed to an oldies-format (still known as "Sunny 103") to compete with Montgomery's other oldies outlet at the time, WBAM-FM, "Oldies 98". WSYA returned to an adult contemporary format a few months later, with radio personalities Kris O'Kelly, Jay St. John, and Joe Marcus, among others, on the air.

The station's current incarnation as WMXS began using the name "Mix 103.3" in 1994. Montgomery DJ Larry Stevens and his partner Leslie Bailey were the morning show host on Mix for several years before Stevens left the station after a disagreement with management. The morning show was renamed "Leslie and Company" with production assistant Lee Edwards taking over for Stevens. The show only lasted 3 months before Bailey left and former WLWI-FM personality Dr. Sam Faulk took over the morning show. Faulk did the show alone for a short time, then was paired with midday host Susan Woody (now with Alice 96.1). Woody left 16 months later and was replaced with Amy Delaney and, after 1 year, with Debbie Montgomery. Faulk recently left the station and now does mornings on WLWI. Jay St. John hosted afternoon drive, and later moved to mid-days. Currently, as of January 2018, Paul Horton is the morning show host with Melissa Bowman and Major Delay. Rachel Marisay does mid-days and John Laurenti the afternoon drive, and John Tesh has Intelligence for Your Life for the evenings.

== Programming ==
Mix 103.3 is one of the highest-rated stations in the Montgomery area, especially with women ages 25–54.

The current weekday DJ line up at Mix 103 is The Morning Show with Paul Horton, with Melissa Bowman and Major Delay 6 am-10 am, Rachel 10 am - 3 pm with The 80's Retro Lunch between noon and 1 pm, John Laurenti 3 to 7 pm, and John Tesh 7 pm to Midnight. On Saturday, it's Paul Horton 9 am-1 pm, Melissa Bowman 1 pm-5 pm and from 5 pm-7 pm it's Backtrax 90's with Kid Kelley. On Sundays, The Jim Brickman Show from 6 am-10 am, Intelligence for our Health with Connie Selleca 10 am-1 pm, Melissa Bowman 1 pm-5 pm, Backtrax 80s 5 pm-7 pm, and John Tesh 7 pm-midnight.

Mix 103.3 has featured some of the most popular DJs in Montgomery radio history including John Garrett (formerly of WHHY-FM, WBAM and WLWI-FM), J.R. Culpepper (formerly of WLWI-FM), Andi Scott (now on WLWI-FM mornings), John Rogers and Matt Murphy (formerly on WYDE-FM in Birmingham.
