= WHLW =

Luverne, Alabama; United States
- Broadcast area: Montgomery, Alabama
- Frequency: 104.3 MHz
- Branding: Hallelujah 104.3 FM

Programming
- Format: Urban contemporary gospel

Ownership
- Owner: iHeartMedia, Inc.; (iHM Licenses, LLC)
- Sister stations: WWMG, WZHT

History
- First air date: 1997 (as WMHS)
- Former call signs: WDHT-FM (1990–1997, CP); WMHS (1997–1998); WQLD (1998–2004); WNTM (2004–2005)
- Call sign meaning: W HaLlelujah Worship

Technical information
- Licensing authority: FCC
- Facility ID: 6655
- Class: C1
- ERP: 13,500 watts
- HAAT: 558 meters (1831 feet)
- Transmitter coordinates: 31°58′28″N 86°9′44″W

Links
- Public license information: Public file; LMS
- Webcast: Listen Live
- Website: 1043hallelujahfm.iheart.com

WHLW (104.3 FM) is a radio station licensed to serve Luverne, Alabama, United States. The station is owned by iHeartMedia, Inc. and licensed to iHM Licenses, LLC, and is one-third of the all-urban Montgomery cluster, complementing urban AC's WWMG and mainstream urban's WZHT. The studios for the three stations are located in East Montgomery near Eastdale Mall, and WHLW has a transmitter site in Grady, Alabama.

It broadcasts an urban contemporary gospel format to the Montgomery, Alabama, market.

Notable on-air personalities currently associated with the station include Connye B, Yvette Bullard-Dillard, and Donnie McKlurkin.

== History ==
This station received its original construction permit from the Federal Communications Commission on December 7, 1988, for a new station to serve Brantley, Alabama. The new station was assigned the call letters WDHT-FM by the FCC on May 10, 1990. On April 18, 1997, the station had its callsign changed to WMHS. After nearly nine years of extensions, modifications (including a change in community of license to Luverne, Alabama), and construction, WMHS received its license to cover from the FCC on October 29, 1997.

In November 1997, Brantley Broadcast Associates reached an agreement to sell this station to Capital Communications. The deal was approved by the FCC on January 22, 1998, and the transaction was consummated on February 20, 1998. Concurrently, Capital Communications reached a contingent agreement to sell this station to Southern Star Communications, Inc. The deal was also approved by the FCC on January 22, 1998, and this transaction was also consummated on February 20, 1998. On March 20, 1998, the new owners had the FCC change the station's callsign to WQLD.

On August 20, 2004, the station had its callsign changed to WNTM. The station was assigned the current WHLW call letters by the FCC on January 14, 2005.
