= Montgomery Area Transit System =

Transportation system in Montgomery, Alabama

Montgomery Area Transit System theM
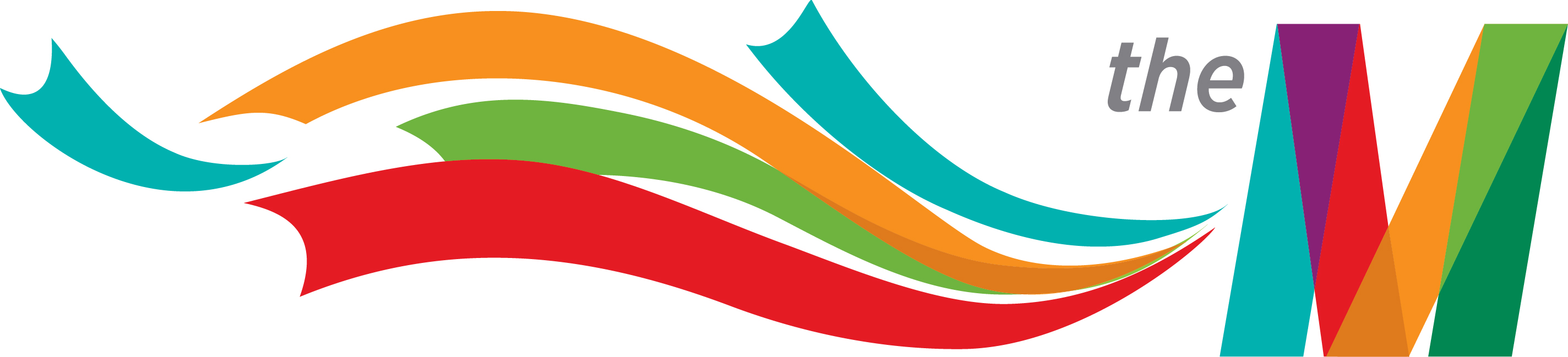
- Founded: 1974
- Headquarters: 2318 West Fairview Ave. Montgomery, AL
- Locale: Montgomery, Alabama
- Service area: Montgomery County, Alabama
- Service type: bus service
- Routes: 14
- Hubs: 495 Molton St.
- Fleet: 32
- Daily ridership: 1,209 (2022)
- Annual ridership: 344,795 (2022)
- Fuel type: Diesel
- Website: themtransit.com

Montgomery Area Transit System is the operator of mass transportation in metropolitan Montgomery, Alabama. The organization was founded in 1974, after years of tumultuous relations between private bus operators and passengers. In 2013, the system underwent a rebranding to The M. Currently, the system is operated under contract by Transdev.

== Intermodal Center ==
The Intermodal Center serves as the primary transfer hub for The M and provides connections to Greyhound Lines intercity buses. The $6 million project opened September 10, 2007. While Greyhound had once been located at the Freedom Rides Museum, intercity buses used a 1951 facility at 950 W. South Ave. from 1995 until April 15, 2019, when Greyhound relocated once again downtown to the Intermodal Center.

== Route list ==
All routes operate weekdays and Saturdays only.

Number	Name	Frequency	Operation		Link
Number	Name	Frequency	Week days	Satur days	Link
1	AUM Eastchase	60 min (weekdays) /120 min(Saturdays)	5:30; 20:45	7:30; 18:45	link
2	Eastdale Mall	30 min (peaks) /30-60 min (off-peaks and evenings) /90 min (Saturdays)	5:30; 21:10	7:30; 18:45	link
3	Montgomery Commons	60 min	5:15; 21:15	7:15; 18:15	link
4	Boylston	60 min (weekdays) /120 min(Saturdays)	5:30; 20:30	7:30; 18:30	link
5	McGhee Road	30-60 min (peaks) /90 min (off-peaks, evenings and Saturdays)	5:30; 21:15	7:30; 19:15	link
6	Southlawn Twingates	60 min	5:15; 20:15	7:15; 18:15	link
7	Maxwell AFB	60 min (weekdays) /120 min(Saturdays)	5:30; 21:30	8:30; 15:30	link
8	Gunter Annex	90 min (weekdays) /120 min(Saturdays)	5:30; 20:30	8:30; 15:30	link
9	Virginia Loop	60 min	5:50; 21:15	7:15; 19:00	link
10	South Court Avenue	60 min (weekdays) /120 min(Saturdays)	5:30; 20:30	7:30; 18:30	link
11	Rosa Parks /South Boulevard	60 min (weekdays) /120 min(Saturdays)	5:00; 21:30	7:30; 18:30	link
12	Smiley Court Gibbs Village	30 min (peaks) /60 min (off-peaks, evenings and Saturdays)	5:30; 21:15	7:30; 18:30	link
16	East-West Connector	90 min	5:15; 20:50	6:45; 18:45	link
17	Boulevard	90 min	5:15; 21:00	6:45; 18:45	link

== Fleet ==
As of 2026, The M’s bus fleet consists of the following:

- ENC E-Z Rider II BRT 32’
- Gillig Low Floor HEV 35’

== Fixed route ridership ==
The ridership statistics shown here are of fixed route services only and do not include demand response services.

== See also ==
- List of bus transit systems in the United States
- Capital City Street Railway
