= WZHT =

Coordinates: 31.975°N 86.162°W

- Troy, Alabama; United States
- Broadcast area: Montgomery, Alabama
- Frequency: 105.7 MHz (HD Radio)
- Branding: Hot 105.7

Programming
- Format: Mainstream urban
- Affiliations: Premiere Networks

Ownership
- Owner: iHeartMedia, Inc.; (iHM Licenses, LLC)
- Sister stations: WHLW, WWMG

History
- First air date: 1972 (as WTUB)
- Former call signs: WTUB (1972–1977); WRES (1977–1982); WIGC (1982–1984); WRJM (1984–1987); WALQ (1987); WMGF (1987–1988)
- Call sign meaning: W Z HoT

Technical information
- Licensing authority: FCC
- Facility ID: 8649
- Class: C
- ERP: 100,000 watts
- HAAT: 558 meters (1,831 ft)

Links
- Public license information: Public file; LMS
- Webcast: Listen Live
- Website: myhot105.iheart.com

WZHT (105.7 FM) is a mainstream urban formatted radio station that is licensed to Troy, Alabama, that serves the Montgomery area. It is owned by iHeartMedia, Inc., and is one-third of the all-urban Montgomery cluster, complementing urban AC's WWMG and urban gospel's WHLW. The studios for the three stations are located in East Montgomery near Eastdale Mall, and WZHT shares a transmitter with television station WSFA in Grady, Alabama. The transmitter location gives WZHT an unusually large coverage as such, which has one of the tallest towers in the Southern United States at 1,830 feet; it was acknowledged in its former slogan "The Station You Hear Everywhere".

== History ==
105.7 FM began operations as 100,000 watt WTUB in 1972 and was owned by the Boothe family from Opp, Alabama. It primarily served Troy and South Central Alabama. It was formatted as a country music station until 1977, when it was sold to Troy businessman R.E. Shelley and became Top 40/CHR "WRES", the new call letters being Shelley's initials.

The station was known as "WRES 106 FM". In 1982, Ozark, Alabama, architect H. Jack Mizell purchased WRES and changed the station back to a country format with WIGC (We're In God's Country), as the call sign. Mizell succeeded in having the transmitter site changed from a 400-foot tower in Troy to share tower space with the nearly 2000-foot tall WSFA-TV tower in the Grady community, located about halfway between Troy and Montgomery. Not only did this give the 105.7 signal strong coverage well into the immediate Montgomery region, but it could also be heard from Birmingham to the north, the Northwest Florida Beaches to the south, the central Mississippi/Alabama border to the west and well into Georgia to the east.

In December 1984, WRJM "Classic 105.7" was born with a soft adult contemporary format except for Saturday nights, when the popular oldies program "Hubcap Classics" was heard.

The station was sold to Mississippi broadcaster Eddie Holliday in October 1987. Holliday moved the offices and studios from Troy to Montgomery and began focusing on the Montgomery market exclusively. "Magic 105.7" had the calls "WALQ" briefly and then "WMGF". 1988 saw another call letter change to "WZHT" and moved into an Urban Contemporary format and became "Hot 105" and then to "Hot 105.7". Holliday sold the station to Clear Channel in the mid-1990s.

In 2009, WZHT started to add some Pop and Dance tracks in their playlist from the likes of Lady Gaga, Kesha, Justin Bieber, and Jason Derulo. However they still report to Mediabase and BDS as Mainstream Urban.

From fall 2005 to October 2013, WZHT was the home to The Steve Harvey Morning Show, however Steve was moved to sister station WWMG which formerly aired The Tom Joyner Morning Show around that time, and now WZHT is the affiliate of Charlamagne Tha God and The Breakfast Club Morning Show.
