= WLWI-FM =

Radio station in Montgomery, Alabama

- Montgomery, Alabama; United States
- Broadcast area: Montgomery, Alabama
- Frequency: 92.3 MHz
- Branding: I-92 Country

Programming
- Format: Country

Ownership
- Owner: Cumulus Media; (Cumulus Licensing LLC)
- Sister stations: WHHY-FM; WMSP; WMXS; WXFX

History
- First air date: July 15, 1969
- Former call signs: WCOV-FM (1969–1973); WKLH (1973–1977); WLWI (1977–1985)

Technical information
- Licensing authority: FCC
- Facility ID: 12318
- Class: C0
- ERP: 100,000 watts
- HAAT: 334 meters (1,096 ft)
- Transmitter coordinates: 32°24′13.5″N 86°11′46.9″W

Links
- Public license information: Public file; LMS
- Webcast: Listen live
- Website: www.wlwi.com

WLWI-FM (92.3 FM, "I-92") is a radio station licensed to serve Montgomery, Alabama, United States. The station is owned by Cumulus Media and the broadcast license is held by Cumulus Licensing, Inc. The WLWI studios are located on the third floor of The Colonial Financial Center in downtown Montgomery, and the transmitter tower is in Montgomery's northeast side.

== Programming ==
WLWI-FM broadcasts a country music format to the Montgomery metropolitan area. Until 2025, the station had a sister news/talk AM station known as WLWI (AM).

I-92 WLWI is the home of Auburn Tigers football and men's basketball.

The I-92 WLWI studios are located in Suite 300 at One Commerce Street in downtown Montgomery, Alabama.

== History ==
This station first began broadcasting on July 15, 1969, as WCOV-FM, the FM partner to AM station WCOV (now WGMP) and television station WCOV-TV. The station was acquired by Griffin Broadcasting Corporation in April 1973 and the callsign was changed to WKLH. This callsign would also prove short-lived as the station was acquired by the Colonial Broadcasting Company in December 1977 and the call letters were changed to WLWI.

The company changed the call letters of newly acquired AM station WBAM (now WMSP) to WLWI on March 11, 1985, so the FM station was assigned the current WLWI-FM call letters by the Federal Communications Commission (FCC) on the same day.

In September 1994, Colonial Company, Inc., the holding company that owned WLWI-FM licensee Colonial Broadcasting Company, Inc., reached an agreement to sell control of the licensee corporation to Robert E. Lowder. The deal was approved by the FCC on December 8, 1994, and the transaction was consummated on March 8, 1995.

In January 1998, Robert E. Lowder agreed to sell licensee Colonial Broadcasting Company, Inc., to Cumulus Holdings, Inc. The deal was approved by the FCC on March 10, 1998. In December 1998, the license for WLWI-FM was transferred to Cumulus Licensing Corp. The deal was approved by the FCC on December 12, 1998, and the transaction was finalized on December 31, 1998.

On July 14, 2010, WLWI-FM added the syndicated Rick and Bubba morning show, formerly on sister station WHHY-FM.

== Awards and honors ==
In 1984, WLWI-FM was named "Radio Station of the Year (Small Market)" by the Academy of Country Music.

A long-time country music formatted station, WLWI-FM has seen its on-air personalities nominated for Country Music Association Awards as Medium Market or Small Market Broadcast Personality of the Year many times over the years. Sam Faulk was nominated in 1981 and won the award in 1989. Warren "Rhubarb" Jones won in 1983. Darlene Dixon was nominated in 1992 and 1999. John Boy was nominated in 1995.

"Rhubarb" Jones won the award for Disc Jockey of the Year in 1983 from the Academy of Country Music.

In 2004, WLWI host Bill Roberts was named Favorite Southern Gospel DJ for a Medium Market at the Singing News Fan Awards.
