= WMGY =

- Montgomery, Alabama; United States
- Frequency: 800 kHz

Programming
- Format: Southern gospel
- Affiliations: Salem Communications

Ownership
- Owner: Terry L. Barber
- Sister stations: WRBZ

History
- First air date: June 26, 1946
- Call sign meaning: Montgomery

Technical information
- Licensing authority: FCC
- Facility ID: 73260
- Class: D
- Power: 1,000 watts (day); 143 watts (night)
- Transmitter coordinates: 32°24′48″N 86°17′25″W
- Translator: 99.3 W257DS (Montgomery)

Links
- Public license information: Public file; LMS

WMGY (800 AM) is a radio station licensed to serve Montgomery, Alabama, United States. The station, which began broadcasting in 1946, is owned by Terry L. Barber.

WMGY broadcasts a Southern Gospel music format to the Montgomery metropolitan area. The station features programming from Salem Communications.

== History ==
This AM station began operations on June 26, 1946, as a daytime-only broadcaster using the callsign WMGY with 1,000 watts of power on 800 kHz under the ownership of the Dixie Broadcasting Company, and an affiliate of the Mutual Broadcasting System. In November 1958, WMGY was acquired by Radio Montgomery, Inc., as part of the C. A. McClure Stations Group.

In the late 1970s, the station's license was transferred to George H. Buck, Jr., and the longtime country and western music format was replaced with Southern Gospel and religious radio programming. The station has maintained this format for more than 30 years and calls itself "the oldest Christian music station in Montgomery". In March 1982, owner George H. Buck, Jr., reached an agreement to transfer the license for this station to WMGY Radio, Inc. The deal was approved by the Federal Communications Commission (FCC) on April 23, 1982. Terry L. Barber purchased WMGY in a transaction that was consummated on April 30, 2015, at a purchase price of $60,000.

In addition to its local broadcasts, WMGY began streaming its programming over the internet in 2007.

As of August 2016, this station is now being heard on W257DS 99.3 FM, in Montgomery. WMGY also features a live and local gospel program, Gospel Saturday Morning, which airs 6-9 a.m. each Saturday playing, along with the top names in gospel music, many local Montgomery area and Alabama based gospel artists as well as interviews with local and national gospel performers. Hosted by local Montgomery native Mark Fowler, Gospel Saturday Morning launched in April 2016.

== Former on-air staff ==
Sammy Stephens, who was given his first job at WMGY by Rad Dodson, became a celebrity for his "It's just like a mini-mall" rap advertisements for Flea Market Montgomery. Stephens got his start in broadcasting as the "Candyman," his on-air persona for WMGY and WXVI radio stations.

Billy Nobles was named Favorite DJ Medium Market by the Singing News Fan Awards in 1988, 1989, and 1993.

Jeffery S Rogers, Also among other Former Staff was hired by Dane Harris in 2001 at age 17 to run weekend programming and even having a 3-hour Radio show on Saturday's and being the On-Air DJ while running the Sunday Programming, Also filling in for Dane Harris when needed and running High School Events till they stopped in 2004, Also making broadcast interviews for Local Lawyers and as well as for other local companies, Before Jeff started, He said " I wanted to be in Radio so bad when I stopped by and talk to Dane just hoping and praying for that chance and being the great guy Dane Harris is, He gave me that chance and I got to be part of WMGY History and fell in love with it " While wanting to get into radio since age 14 receiving his Ham Radio ( Amateur Radio ) License, His Radio Call Sign " W4JFF " being the youngest in Montgomery and at age 15 receiving a higher License having to learn Morse code at a Speed of 13 Words Per Minute and Also being part of " The Central Alabama Skywarn " by the National Weather Service in Birmingham and also part of the Ham Radio EMA or ( ARES ) to provide communication when storms and other threats arise, Like Y2K at the end of 1999 having a station set up on New Year's Eve night of 1999 with other Ham Radio operations set up around the Montgomery area linking to the EMA Station downtown in case of computer and communications shut down being able to use Jeff and over 25 Other operators around the city to be a backup for communications in the area. Jeff's last day at WMGY Radio was about 2 weeks before Dane Harris left in 2015 as that same month the station was sold. Jeff still does small Radio Work and still helps with " The Central Alabama Skywarn " as an " Advanced Storm Spotter " & EMA Communications during bad storms in the area as well as other threats in which Help is Needed.
