= WHHY-FM =

Radio station in Montgomery, Alabama

- Montgomery, Alabama; United States
- Frequency: 101.9 MHz (HD Radio)
- Branding: Y-102

Programming
- Format: Top 40 (CHR)
- Affiliations: Compass Media Networks; Westwood One

Ownership
- Owner: Cumulus Media; (Cumulus Licensing LLC)
- Sister stations: WLWI-FM; WMSP; WMXS; WXFX

History
- First air date: September 9, 1962
- Former call signs: WHHY-FM (1962–1996); WMKK (April–May 1996); WJCC (1996–1999)
- Call sign meaning: "Why" (or "Y")

Technical information
- Licensing authority: FCC
- Facility ID: 66910
- Class: C0
- ERP: 100,000 watts
- HAAT: 334 meters (1,096 ft)
- Transmitter coordinates: 32°24′13″N 86°11′47″W

Links
- Public license information: Public file; LMS
- Webcast: Listen live
- Website: www.y102montgomery.com

WHHY-FM (101.9 MHz, "Y102") is a radio station licensed to serve Montgomery, Alabama, United States. The station is owned by Cumulus Media.

Y102 broadcasts a top 40 (CHR) music format. The WHHY-FM studios are located on the 3rd floor of The Colonial Financial Center in downtown Montgomery. The broadcast signal, based from a transmitter in Montgomery's northeast side, can be heard as far away as Birmingham, Alabama, and is generally clear south of there along Interstate 65.

== History ==
WHHY-FM first operated in downtown Montgomery. The station went on the air on September 9, 1962. During the late 1960s, the station moved from the Frank Leu Building downtown, into a house on Norman Bridge Road. A broadcast wing was added to the back of the building in the early 1970s. WHHY-FM was the FM sister station of WHHY (1440 AM), owned by Holt/Robinson. The FM station on 101.9 was an automated FM country music station before becoming a rock station. It would be known as "The Music FM - Y-102". The FM station would simulcast the AM's morning show hosted by longtime personality and program director Larry Stevens. This was followed on AM by Kris O'Kelly, "The Thin Man", music director Lanny West, Jeffry Tilden, and public relations director Mike Sanders. During the 1970s Y-102 would split from the AM at 10 am each morning and would broadcast light classic rock, while WHHY AM played top 40.

WHHY had a large and well equipped news department that was known for the use of a geographically distributed severe weather team that reported live from locations along the predicted path of severe weather and possible tornadoes.

The news team was on call 24-7 and no breaking news events in the broadcast coverage area went uncovered. The news staff included Don Phelps, Angie Wilson, Jennifer Reid, Jim McDade, Jimmy Carter, Henry Schmitt, and the legendary Robert Charles. Charles is fondly remembered for his news closer borrowed from the poetic quatrain of Omar Khayyám, “The Moving Finger writes; and, having writ, moves on!”.

In January 1979, John Reed (Prater) left the midday shift to take over Y-102. It was under the guidance of Reed that Y-102-FM not only became the highest rated station in the Montgomery market during the April–May 1979 sweeps, Radio and Records magazine announced that Y-102 had the highest market share of any FM station in the nation. Those ratings were released during the summer of 1979, and it was not long after that when plans to move the Top 40 WHHY-AM programming to Y-102 in August 1979.

The on-air lineup chosen by Reed at Y-102 included Phil “Fish” Horton, Reid Spann, James Spann, Steve Johnson, and Bob Underwood.

In the early 1980s, the FM became the focus station of the pair. The FM was changed to CHR. The AM format was changed to adult contemporary. During the 1990s Holt/Robinson broadcasting began to have money problems. Longtime morning show host Larry Stevens exited to rival Colonial Broadcasting. The format was shifted to "New Rock" and known as "Live 101.9". In May 1993, Holt-Robinson Communications Corporation was placed into receivership. Thomas M. Duddy was approved by the Federal Communications Commission (FCC) as receiver on June 21, 1993. In May 1995, receiver Thomas M. Duddy made a deal to sell this station to McDonald Investment Company, Inc. The deal was approved by the FCC on July 3, 1995, and the transaction was consummated on September 15, 1995. McDonald in turn sold it to Cumulus Broadcasting. The FM station's format was changed to country music by McDonald then back to CHR by Cumulus. The AM had several formats, including late 1970s AC with Larry King overnights and oldies. Cumulus Broadcasting changed the format of the AM to talk ("News Radio 1440") and ended the heritage call letters WHHY.

The station was reassigned the heritage WHHY-FM call letters by the FCC on January 22, 1999.

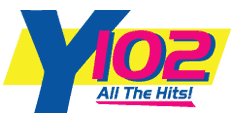
Logo under previous slogan
