= WMSP =

- Montgomery, Alabama; United States
- Frequency: 740 kHz
- Branding: Jox 740

Programming
- Format: Sports
- Affiliations: Westwood One Sports; Atlanta Braves Radio Network

Ownership
- Owner: Cumulus Media; (Cumulus Licensing LLC)
- Sister stations: WHHY-FM; WLWI-FM; WMXS; WXFX

History
- First air date: November 24, 1953
- Former call signs: WBAM (1952–1985); WLWI (1985–1995)
- Call sign meaning: Montgomery Sports

Technical information
- Licensing authority: FCC
- Facility ID: 12316
- Class: B
- Power: 10,000 watts (day); 233 watts (night)
- Transmitter coordinates: 32°25′18″N 86°09′51″W
- Repeater: 95.1 WXFX-HD2 (Prattville)

Links
- Public license information: Public file; LMS
- Webcast: Listen live; Listen live (via iHeartRadio)
- Website: www.joxmontgomery.com

WMSP (740 kHz, "Jox 740") is a radio station licensed to serve Montgomery, Alabama, United States. The station is owned by Cumulus Media and the broadcast license is held by Cumulus Licensing LLC. Originally licensed in 1953 as WBAM, the station broadcast contemporary and country music before turning to sports talk under the WMSP callsign in 1995. The WMSP studios are located on the 3rd floor of The Colonial Financial Center in downtown Montgomery, and the transmitter tower is in Montgomery's northeast side.

== Programming ==
WMSP broadcasts a sports-talk format. The station is an affiliate of Westwood One Sports. In addition to sports talk programming, WMSP airs Atlanta Braves baseball, both Alabama Crimson Tide football games and Auburn Tigers football games as well as select daytime baseball games of the Southern League's Montgomery Biscuits.

== History ==
=== WBAM, The Big BAM ===
This station first began operations on November 24, 1953 as a daytime-only 50,000-watt AM station broadcasting on 740 kHz as WBAM. Owned and operated by the Deep South Broadcasting Company, WBAM broadcast area covered most of Alabama and parts of Georgia and Florida. "The Big BAM" aired a variety of music formats over the years, including Top 40 during the late-1960s and early-1970s, but by 1973 had settled on a country music format. As a daytimer, WBAM had to cease broadcasting each night at sunset and the station played "Dixie" as a sign-off.

WBAM became known as "The Big BAM" or "The Voice of the Deep South", and is legendary. Disc jockeys associated with WBAM's Top 40 heyday include Bill J. Moody, now the sales manager for WDJR in Dothan, Bobby Brennan, Dan Brennan (Dan's Dusty Discs), Coby Shubert and Joe Cook. Big BAM Shows of the late 1960s and early 1970s featured all the biggest artists of the day, including Paul Revere and the Raiders, Lou Christie, Iron Butterfly, The Carpenters, The Monkees (as a group and individually), Tommy Joyce and Bobby Heart, The Grass Roots, and many more. Ticket prices were never more expensive than $4.00.

Mornings were dedicated to farm and gospel music programming, with country and popular music played during the day.

In 1973, WBAM adopted a country music format. WBAM was sold to Colonial Broadcasting in 1985, and an era ended when the call letters changed to WMSP for sports radio programming.

On September 15, 2009 the building the original WBAM studios were located in was demolished.

In August 2025, WMSP rebranded as "Jox Montgomery".

=== Former programming and personalities ===
In the mid-1950s, the station was home to the "WBAM Deep South Jamboree" featuring live country and bluegrass acts such as Shorty Sullivan and his Green Valley Boys, Rebe Gosdin and his Sunny Valley Gang, Judy Jenkins, Jack Turner, and other rotating regulars.

Radio personality Johnny Gilbert began his broadcasting career at WBAM. Gilbert was killed in a helicopter accident while working as an airborne traffic reporter at KULF in Houston, Texas, on March 15, 1974. He was posthumously awarded the Steve Pieringer Award by the Texas Association of Broadcasters in 1974.

In the 1960s and early 1970s, the station sponsored a series of pop/rock concerts known as "Big BAM Shows" featuring acts ranging from Paul Revere and the Raiders, Lou Christie, and The Beach Boys to comedian Pat Paulsen.

Other notable former personalities included Bill J. Moody, Paul Simpkins, Mark Robbins, Gene Hocutt and Joe Cook.

=== Awards and honors ===
Paul Simpkins, an original WBAM on-air personality from the time of the station's launch in 1953 until the sale in 1984, received a number of honors during his more than three decades with the station. These include being named Sterling Magazine Personality of the Month and TV Radio Mirror Personality of the Month in 1967, 1968 and 1972. Simpkins was inducted into the Country Music DJ Hall of Fame in 1998.

Cyril Brennan, the general manager and program director of WBAM, was named the 1976 "Program Director of the Year for Country Music" by Billboard magazine's International Radio Programming Forum.

=== Former programming and personalities ===
In the mid-1950s, the station was home to the "WBAM Deep South Jamboree" featuring live country and bluegrass acts such as Shorty Sullivan and his Green Valley Boys, Rebe Gosdin and his Sunny Valley Gang, Judy Jenkins, Jack Turner, and other rotating regulars.

Radio personality Johnny Gilbert began his broadcasting career at WBAM. Gilbert was killed in a helicopter accident while working as an airborne traffic reporter at KULF in Houston, Texas, on March 15, 1974. He was posthumously awarded the Steve Pieringer Award by the Texas Association of Broadcasters in 1974.

In the 1960s and early 1970s, the station sponsored a series of pop/rock concerts known as "Big BAM Shows" featuring acts ranging from Paul Revere and the Raiders, Lou Christie, and The Beach Boys to comedian Pat Paulsen.

Cliff Ellis, award-winning college basketball coach and currently the head coach at Coastal Carolina University, was a musician in the mid-1960s and his group, The Villagers, had several regional hits in the Southeastern U.S. The group got their first big break when Ellis convinced WBAM disc jockey Bill Moody to play their first self-financed record, "Laugh It Off", on the air. The airplay led the band to a record deal with FAME Studios.

=== In popular culture ===
WBAM is name-checked with "This is country country on WBAM coming to you live, neighbor" in the poem "Pickup" by American poet Paul Allen.

Alabama author Paul Hemphill included references to WBAM in his 1979 novel Long Gone as the preferred radio station of the protagonist, Jamie Weeks. In 1987, Long Gone was made into a movie starring Dermot Mulroney by HBO Films.

=== Historical photos ===
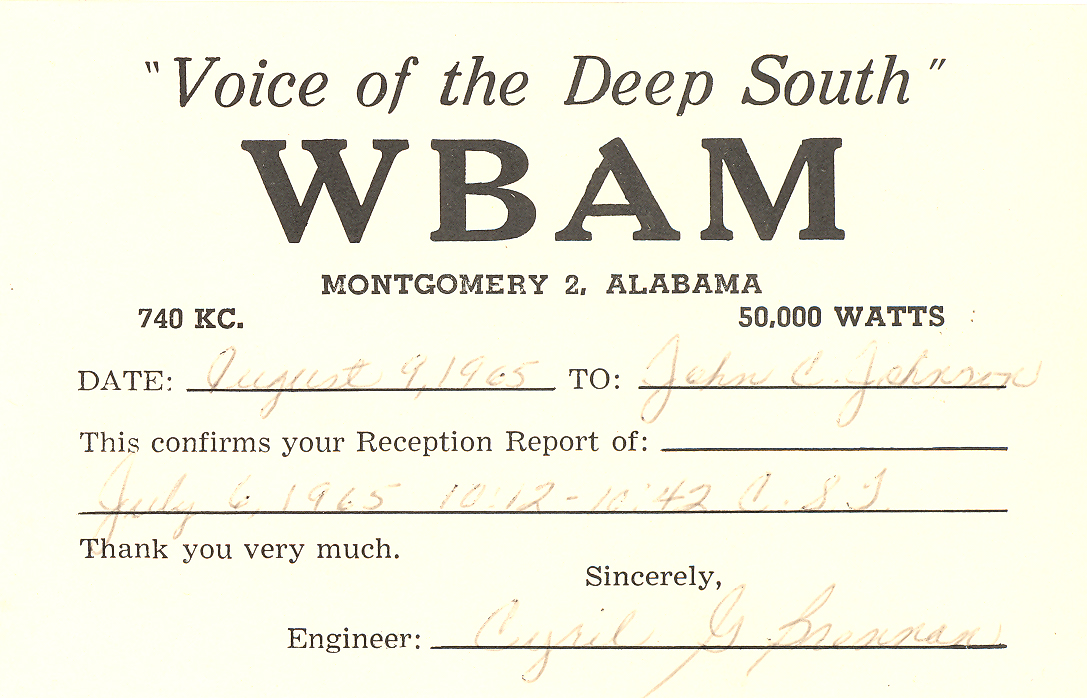
A card showing proof of DXing reception from Pensacola, Florida

=== Historical videos ===
TV and Radio personality Jimmy Carter has assembled a few videos featuring some photos, jingles, and air checks of WBAM in its heyday.

- WBAM Big Bam Shows
- Dan's Dusty Discs WBAM
- WBAM Pictures

=== As WLWI ===
After more than 30 years of ownership by the Brennan family, Deep South Broadcasting Company reached an agreement in October 1984 to sell this station to Colonial Broadcasting Company, Inc. The deal was approved by the Federal Communications Commission (FCC) on November 30, 1984, and the transaction was consummated on March 5, 1985. The new owners had the FCC change the station's call sign to WLWI on March 11, 1985.

In September 1994, Colonial Company, Inc., which owned station licensee Colonial Broadcasting Company, agreed to transfer control of the licensee to Robert E. Lowder. The deal was approved by the FCC on December 8, 1994, and the transaction was consummated on March 8, 1995. Less than one week later, Robert E. Lowder applied to the FCC to transfer control of the licensee company to Republic Corporation. The transfer was approved by the FCC on April 14, 1995, but the transaction was never consummated.

In February 1995, after more than 40 years as a 50,000-watt regional "blowtorch", WLWI applied to the FCC to decrease its daytime broadcast power to 10,000 watts. On a positive note however, the station would now be able to broadcast 24 hours a day for the first time. The station was granted a construction permit on April 20, 1995, and began licensed operation at the lower power on November 15, 1996.

=== As WMSP ===
This station's callsign was changed to WMSP on August 1, 1995, to reflect a new emphasis on sports talk programming. In January 1998, Robert E. Lowder reached an agreement to sell WMSP license holder Colonial Broadcasting Company, Inc., to Cumulus Holdings, Inc. The deal was approved by the FCC on March 10, 1998. In December 1998, after a number of internal ownership transfers of Colonial Broadcasting Company, the broadcast license for WMSP was transferred to Cumulus Licensing Corporation. The transfer was approved by the FCC on December 12, 1998, and the transaction was consummated on December 31, 1998.
