= WXFX =

- Prattville, Alabama; United States
- Broadcast area: Montgomery, Alabama
- Frequency: 95.1 MHz (HD Radio)
- Branding: 95.1 The Fox

Programming
- Format: Classic rock
- Subchannels: HD2: Simulcast of WMSP (sports); HD3: "95.1 The Vibe HD3" (classic hip hop); HD4: WAY-FM
- Affiliations: Premiere Networks; United Stations Radio Networks

Ownership
- Owner: Cumulus Media; (Cumulus Licensing LLC)
- Sister stations: WHHY-FM; WLWI-FM; WMSP; WMXS

History
- First air date: 1977 (as WQIM at 95.3)
- Former call signs: WQIM (1977–1989)
- Former frequencies: 95.3 MHz (1977–1989)
- Call sign meaning: "Fox"

Technical information
- Licensing authority: FCC
- Facility ID: 17479
- Class: C2
- ERP: 5,400 watts
- HAAT: 333.8 meters (1,095 ft)
- Transmitter coordinates: 32°24′13″N 86°11′47″W
- Translator: HD4: 102.3 W272CO (Montgomery)

Links
- Public license information: Public file; LMS
- Webcast: Listen live; HD2: Listen live
- Website: www.wxfx.com; HD3: www.951thevibe.com

WXFX (95.1 FM, "95.1 The Fox") is an American radio station licensed to serve the community of Prattville, Alabama. The station, established in 1977 as WQIM, is owned by Cumulus Media and the broadcast license is held by Cumulus Licensing LLC. The WXFX studios are located on the third floor of The Colonial Financial Center in downtown Montgomery, and the transmitter tower is in Montgomery's northeast side.

== Programming ==
WXFX broadcasts a classic rock music format to the Montgomery, Alabama, market. Notable on air personalities include Rick Hendrick, Kelley Stone, and "The Big Show" with John Boy and Billy.

WXFX also broadcasts digitally in HD Radio with its own programming on the HD1 channel, a sports radio simulcast of WMSP on HD2, and a classic hip hop format on HD3.

== History ==
This station received its original broadcast license from the Federal Communications Commission (FCC) in August 1977, signing on with a Top 40 music format broadcast with 3,000 watts of effective radiated power on an assigned frequency of 95.3 megahertz. Owned by Hagler Broadcasting, the new station was assigned the WQIM call sign by the FCC.

In October 1981, license holder Hagler Broadcasting, Inc., reached an agreement to sell this station to Downs Broadcasting, Inc. The deal was approved by the FCC on January 28, 1982, and the transaction was consummated on February 1, 1982. The new owners flipped the format to urban contemporary music and maintained it through the 1980s.

In November 1988, WQIM applied to the FCC for a construction permit to change frequencies from 95.3 to 95.1 MHz, change the antenna's height above average terrain to 150 meters (490 ft), and change class to C2. The FCC granted this permit on February 16, 1989, with a scheduled expiration date of August 16, 1990. To accompany the change in frequencies, the station's call sign was changed to WXFX on September 12, 1989. After completing and certifying the necessary engineering changes, the FCC granted the station a license to cover those changes on May 15, 1990. A format change also happened, once the upgraded signal signed on. The format was flipped to classic rock.

In April 1995, license holder Downs Broadcasting reached an agreement to sell this station to McDonald Investment Company, Inc., for $1.65 million. The deal was approved by the FCC on July 3, 1995, and the transaction was consummated on August 30, 1995. The new owners tweaked the station's music format to mainstream rock. In October 1996, license holder McDonald Investment Company, Inc., applied to the FCC to reorganize its Montgomery radio holdings into a new company called McDonald Media Group, Inc. The transfer was approved by the FCC on November 7, 1996, and the transaction was consummated on December 2, 1996.

In August 1998, Cumulus Media signed a local marketing agreement with McDonald Media Group to take over operations of its three Montgomery-area radio stations with an option to purchase the stations. In November 1999, license holder McDonald Media Group, Inc., filed an application to sell WXFX and multiple sister stations to Citation Limited Partnership. The deal was approved by the FCC on December 17, 1999, and the transaction was consummated on January 20, 2000. In August 2000, license holder Citation Limited Partnership applied to transfer this station to Cumulus Licensing Corporation as part of an internal corporate reorganization. The deal was approved by the FCC on March 12, 2001, and the transaction was consummated on May 15, 2001.
