= WALX =

- Orrville, Alabama; United States
- Broadcast area: Selma, Alabama
- Frequency: 100.9 MHz (HD Radio)
- Branding: ALEX-FM

Programming
- Format: Classic hits
- Subchannels: HD2: Classic country HD3: Urban gospel

Ownership
- Owner: Scott Communications, Inc.
- Sister stations: WJAM, WMRK-FM

History
- First air date: December 15, 1973
- Call sign meaning: Alexander Broadcasting

Technical information
- Licensing authority: FCC
- Facility ID: 950
- Class: C2
- ERP: 50,000 watts
- HAAT: 150 meters (490 ft)
- Transmitter coordinates: 32°21′40″N 86°52′28″W
- Translators: HD3: 96.3 W242BW (Selma); HD2: 101.5 W268BQ (Selma)

Links
- Public license information: Public file; LMS
- Website: walxradio.com

WALX (100.9 FM, "ALEX-FM") is a classic hits music formatted radio station licensed to Orrville, Alabama, and serving the Selma, Alabama, market. The station is owned by Scott Communications, Inc.

== Programming ==
WALX airs The Rick and Bubba Show Sunday-Friday mornings, Getting Outdoors with Big Daddy Lawler Saturday mornings, Todd Prater on mid-days, and The Paul Finebaum Network each weekday afternoon. On March 23, 2009, the station flipped from Top 40-oriented "Lazer 101" to a classic hits format branded as "ALEX-FM".

In addition to its usual music programming, WALX formerly broadcast the high school football games of Montgomery, Alabama's Saint James School starting with the 2008 season. These games had previously aired on WACV (1170 AM).

== Station relocation ==
On April 27, 2006, the station was granted a construction permit by the Federal Communications Commission to change its community of license from Selma to Orrville, Alabama. On February 10, 2009, the station was granted a license to cover for the change. Just over a week later, on February 18, 2009, the station applied to relocate again, this time to Valley Grande, Alabama.
