= WACV =

Coosada, Alabama; United States
- Broadcast area: Montgomery Metropolitan Area
- Frequency: 93.1 MHz
- Branding: News Talk 93.1

Programming
- Format: News/talk
- Affiliations: Premiere Networks

Ownership
- Owner: Bluewater Broadcasting Company, LLC; (Liberty Acquisitions 825, LLC)
- Sister stations: WBAM-FM, WGMP, WJWZ, WQKS-FM

History
- First air date: 2012 FM
- Former call signs: WGMP (2011–2012)

Technical information
- Licensing authority: FCC
- Facility ID: 189524
- Class: A
- ERP: 3,100 watts
- HAAT: 141.3 meters (463 feet)
- Transmitter coordinates: 32°28′41″N 86°24′28″W

Links
- Public license information: Public file; LMS
- Webcast: Listen Live
- Website: newstalk931.com

WACV (93.1 FM News Talk 93.1) is a news/talk formatted radio station that serves the Montgomery Metropolitan Area.

The station's broadcast license is held by Liberty Acquisitions 825, LLC, and the station is operated under a local marketing agreement by Bluewater Broadcasting Company, LLC. The station's studios are located on Wall St. in Midtown Montgomery, and the transmitter site is in Prattville, Alabama.

WACV also participates in the Montgomery rating survey by Arbitron (Market #150).

== History ==
While the 93.1 frequency is brand new, the News/Talk format and call sign have been around since November 1984 when WACV was "News Talk 1170, Montgomery's Talk Station".

The original lineup included Don Markwell, news from Bob Jackson, with updates from WAKA CBS 8. Locally originated programs, such as "Viewpoint", continued on "News Talk 107.9" with Dan Morris and Mark Montiel, and Greg Budell continued "Happy Hour". Nationally syndicated talk programming features Laura Ingraham, Glenn Beck, Rusty Humphries, Jerry Doyle, Roy Masters, and Neal Boortz.

The 1170 AM brand continued until April 2, 2009 when it moved to WMRK-FM (then WJAM-FM) as Montgomery's First FM News Talk Station. The branding changed to "News Talk 107.9 FM".

In May, 2011 Liberty Acquisitions 825, LLC won 93.1 Class A FM during an FCC auction with a winning bid of $987,000.

On August 13, 2012 the WACV call sign swapped with WGMP. On August 15, 2012, the station signed on at half-power, for program testing as required by the FCC. On August 31, 2012 the News Talk format moved from WMRK-FM on to WACV and was re-branded as "News Talk 93.1".

The LMA between Bluewater Broadcasting Company, LLC and Alexander Broadcasting terminated on September 1, 2012 and a new LMA between Liberty Acquisitions 825, LLC and Bluewater Broadcasting Company, LLC started.

WMRK-FM now broadcasts K-LOVE, a contemporary Christian format.

== Programming ==
The current weekday lineup includes Coast to Coast AM with George Noory, Greg Budell mornings and afternoons, News & Views with Joey, Straight Talk with Apryl Marie, The Health and Wealth Show with David Earnest, and Dave Ramsey. WACV also features local news updates from the Alabama News Network (CBS8 and ABC32), Rich Thomas Weather reports, and hourly national news updates from the Salem Radio Network.

== Technical information ==
WACV broadcasts with a Broadcast Electronics 5 kW STX LP transmitter at 3,100 watts effective radiated power into a Dielectric DRCM-2 directional antenna from a tower in Prattville, Alabama.
