= WQKS-FM =

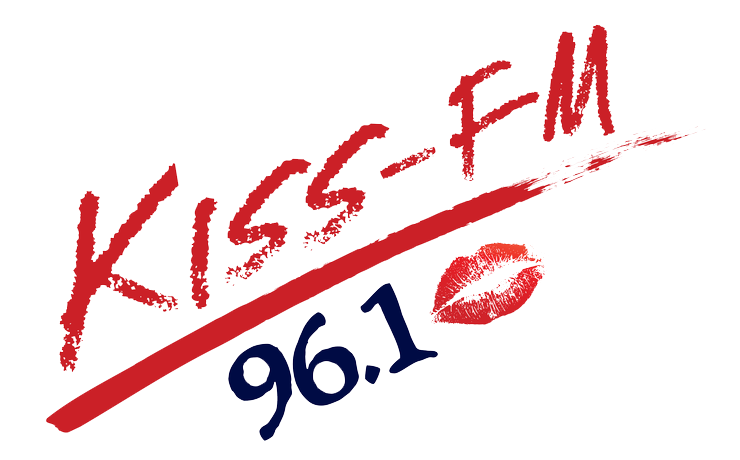
- Montgomery, Alabama; United States
- Frequency: 96.1 MHz (HD Radio)
- Branding: Kiss-FM 96.1

Programming
- Format: Classic hits
- Subchannels: HD2: Streamz 100 (Urban contemporary); HD3: 107.1 The Vault (Classic rock); HD4: 103.9 The Possum (Classic country)

Ownership
- Owner: Bluewater Broadcasting Company, LLC
- Sister stations: WACV, WGMP, WBAM-FM, WJWZ

History
- First air date: December 2, 1990
- Former call signs: WLNE-FM (1990–1995); WRWO (1995–1999)
- Call sign meaning: Works for both former branding (Q) and current branding (Kiss)

Technical information
- Licensing authority: FCC
- Facility ID: 43628
- Class: A
- ERP: 900 watts
- HAAT: 250 meters (820 ft)
- Transmitter coordinates: 32°22′03″N 86°15′42″W
- Translators: HD2: 100.5 W263BX (Montgomery); HD3: 107.1 W296AI (Montgomery); HD4: 103.9 W280EI (Montgomery)

Links
- Public license information: Public file; LMS
- Webcast: Listen Live; Listen live (HD2); Listen Live (HD3); Listen Live (HD4)
- Website: kiss961.com streamz100.com (HD2) thevault1071.com (HD3); 1039thepossum.com (HD4)

WQKS-FM (96.1 MHz), also known as Kiss-FM 96.1, is a United States classic hits formatted radio station that serves the Montgomery Metropolitan Area, licensed to Montgomery, Alabama. The station is locally owned and operated by Bluewater Broadcasting Company, LLC. The station's transmitter is located in Montgomery. The station's studios are located on Wall St. in Midtown Montgomery.

WQKS-FM also participates in Montgomery rating survey by Nielsen Audio (Market #157).

== Programming ==
WQKS-FM broadcasts a classic hits music format and features news and weather updates from CBS 8 WAKA, national news updates from Fox News Radio, and traffic from Montgomery Skywatch Traffic.

=== WQKS-HD2 ===
On August 17, 2011 WQKS-HD2 launched a soft AC format, branded as "Lite 100.5", using the frequency of FM translator W263BX in its branding. On December 26, 2014, 100.5/96.1 HD2 flipped to classic hip hop, with the old format and name of 107.1/96.1 HD, as "Yo! 100.5". On November 13, 2025, 100.5/96.1 HD2 changed their format to urban contemporary, branded as "Streamz 100".

=== WQKS-HD3 ===
On August 17, 2011 WQKS-HD3 launched a classic hip hop format branded as "Yo! 107.1", using the frequency of FM translator W296AI in its branding. On September 25, 2013, the station changed formats to album oriented rock as "107.1 The Vault". On September 17, 2015 the station flipped to Top 40/CHR as "Hits 107.1". On August 9, 2017 the station flipped back to classic rock, branded as "107.1 The Vault".

=== WQKS-HD4 ===
On June 5, 2013 WQKS-HD4 launched a classic country format branded as "103.9 The Possum", using the frequency of FM translator W280EI in its branding.

== History ==
WQKS-FM has featured several sets of call letters and various formats over the past two decades. This station received its original construction permit from the Federal Communications Commission on December 4, 1990. The new station was assigned the call letters WLNE-FM by the FCC on December 21, 1990. WLNE-FM received its license to cover from the FCC on February 1, 1991.

From its origins in the early 1990s, the station was created and owned by Al Stroh and the now-defunct Montgomery Broadcast Properties. This frequency began as WLNE-FM ("We're Light N Easy") with beautiful music and standards in 1991. Later, 96.1 moved towards Lite AC as "Lite FM 96".

In March 1995, the station switched to the popular "Arrow" (All Rock and Roll Oldies) format and changed the calls to WRWO. The station dropped oldies in 1997 and became known as "Kiss 96" with an urban contemporary format. The station debuted another new format in late 1998, this time all 1980s music with the slogan "The 80's Channel, Kiss 96.1". In June 1999, the call letters officially changed to WQKS-FM to match the "Kiss" branding.

WQKS-FM made yet another format tweak in early 2000 into "Rockin' hits of the 80's, 90's and 70's" with the slogan "Alice 96.1". Alice was a successful station for most of its eight years, particularly on weekends with its popular "Alice Shuffle" format—the musical predecessor of Q 96.1.

On August 26, 2008 WQKS-FM dropped its rockin' hits format for oldies, adopting the moniker "Q 96.1".

On July 2, 2010 WQKS-FM shifted their format from oldies to classic hits.

On March 9, 2016 WQKS-FM flipped to AC as "Kiss-FM 96.1".

== Ownership ==
In March 2004, Montgomery Broadcast Properties Ltd. (Allan Stroh, CEO) reached an agreement to sell this station to Bluewater Broadcasting LLC. The sale was part of a four-station deal valued at a reported $15.3 million. The deal was approved by the FCC on April 21, 2004, and the transaction was consummated on June 21, 2004. At the time of the sale, WQKS-FM was broadcasting a classic hits music format.

== Technical information ==
WQKS broadcasts in HD with a 2.5 kW Nautel transmitter into an Dielectric DCRM-2 non-directional antenna. The antenna is multi-station capable and also broadcasts FM translators W285AJ, W280EI and W263BX.

=== Translators ===
WQKS-FM's HD Radio subchannels are transmitted by individual broadcast translator stations in analog format, which also provide their numerical branding.

Broadcast translator for WQKS-HD2
Call sign	Frequency	City of license	FID	ERP (W)	Class	FCC info
W263BX	100.5 FM	Montgomery, Alabama	85917	80	D	LMS

Broadcast translator for WQKS-HD4
Call sign	Frequency	City of license	FID	ERP (W)	Class	FCC info
W280EI	103.9 FM	Montgomery, Alabama	150858	250	D	LMS

Broadcast translator for WQKS-HD3
Call sign	Frequency	City of license	FID	ERP (W)	Class	FCC info
W296AI	107.1 FM	Montgomery, Alabama	33501	99	D	LMS
