= WQCR =

- Alabaster, Alabama; United States
- Broadcast area: Birmingham, Alabama
- Frequency: 1500 kHz
- Branding: La Jefa

Programming
- Format: Spanish Adult Hits

Ownership
- Owner: Rivera Communications, LLC
- Sister stations: WAYE

History
- First air date: 1981
- Former call signs: WQMS (1981–1984); WGTT (1984–2000)

Technical information
- Licensing authority: FCC
- Facility ID: 72131
- Class: D
- Power: 2,300 watts (day); 1,200 watts (critical hours); 3 watts (night)
- Transmitter coordinates: 33°12′27″N 86°45′34″W

Links
- Public license information: Public file; LMS
- Webcast: Listen Live
- Website: lajefa983.com/home-page

WQCR (1500 AM, "La Jefa") is a radio station licensed to serve Alabaster, Alabama, United States. The station is owned by Rivera Communications, LLC.

WQCR broadcasts a Spanish adult hits music format to the Birmingham, Alabama, area. This station, WJHX, and WZGX comprise the "La 10 Q" radio network that covers central Alabama, north Alabama, and central Tennessee.

== History ==
This station received its original construction permit for a new 1,000 watt daytime-only AM station at 1500 kHz from the Federal Communications Commission on April 23, 1981. The new station was assigned the call letters WQMS by the FCC on July 27, 1981. WQMS received its license to cover from the FCC on October 30, 1981. The station initially broadcast an adult contemporary format and targeted Shelby County, but was not very successful competing against Birmingham stations such as WSGN, WAPI, WERC and, by 1983, WMJJ.

The station applied for new call letters and was assigned WGTT on December 1, 1984. In December 1987, Metrosouth Broadcasting, Inc., reached an agreement to sell this station to Fanning Broadcasting Company, Inc. The deal was approved by the FCC on January 27, 1988, and the transaction was consummated on February 1, 1988. At that time, the station changed formats and began playing Southern gospel music.

In March 1992, Fanning Broadcasting Company, Inc., contracted to sell this station to WGTT, Inc. The deal was approved by the FCC on April 21, 1992, and the transaction was consummated on May 7, 1992.

The station was assigned the current WQCR call letters on December 21, 2000. WQCR was granted a new construction permit to increase daytime broadcasting power to 2,300 watts, critical hours power to 1,200 watts, and add nighttime service at 3 watts. The FCC issued a license to cover the completed upgrade on March 6, 2003.

In November 2005, WGTT, Inc., reached an agreement to sell this station to Maria G. Esparza. The deal was approved by the FCC on December 29, 2005, and the transaction was consummated on February 10, 2006.
