= WXAL =

Simulcast of WZNJ Demopolis

Demopolis, Alabama; United States
- Frequency: 1400 kHz
- Branding: 106.5 The River

Programming
- Format: Defunct (was Urban contemporary–Urban oldies)
- Affiliations: The Steve Harvey Morning Show (Premiere Networks); The Touch (Westwood One)

Ownership
- Owner: Westburg Broadcasting Alabama, LLC
- Sister stations: WINL, WZNJ, WALQ

History
- First air date: January 1948; 78 years ago

Technical information
- Licensing authority: FCC
- Facility ID: 61425
- Class: C
- Power: 790 watts unlimited
- Transmitter coordinates: 32°30′8″N 87°49′7″W

Links
- Public license information: Public file; LMS
- Webcast: Listen live
- Website: www.znj1065.com

WXAL (1400 AM) was an American radio station licensed to serve Demopolis, Alabama. Since August 2011, the station has been owned by Westburg Broadcasting Alabama, LLC. It aired an urban contemporary and urban oldies music format, simulcasting sister station WZNJ. Much of the station's programming was previously derived from ESPN Radio.

The station was assigned the "WXAL" call sign by the Federal Communications Commission.

WXAL had served Demopolis for more than 60 years.

During most of the 1980s, WXAL played music and had a Top 40 format. It was owned by World War II veteran Mac Jordan. Its sister station, in the same building on Highway 80 East, was automated and played country music. The FM station's call letters were WNAN, for Jordan's wife Nan.

WXAL had live wire service from the Associated Press from 1981 to 1983.

DJs who were live on WXAL were responsible for maintaining/keeping an eye on the automation system at WNAN. The old WXAL building stood until the week of May 3, 2010, and was affectionately known by DJs as the "radio igloo" for its white color and shape.

== History ==
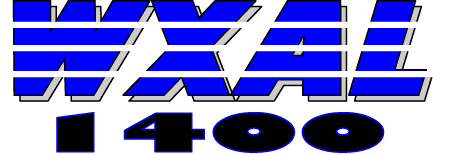
Former logo

WXAL began broadcasting in January 1948. It was owned by T.H. Gailliard, W.M. Jordan and W.P. Thielens.

The Federal Communications Commission cancelled the station’s license on January 8, 2024.
