= WJHX =

- Lexington, Alabama; United States
- Broadcast area: Huntsville, Alabama
- Frequency: 620 kHz

Programming
- Format: Defunct

Ownership
- Owner: Bar Broadcasting, Inc.
- Sister stations: WQCR, WZGX

History
- First air date: 1981
- Former call signs: WWLX (1981–1987); WKNI (1987–2000); WZNN (2000–2004)

Technical information
- Facility ID: 14051
- Class: D
- Power: 5,000 watts (day); 99 watts (night)
- Transmitter coordinates: 34°58′37″N 87°22′10″W

WJHX (620 AM) was an American radio station licensed to serve the community of Lexington, Alabama. The station was last owned by Bar Broadcasting, Inc.

Before it fell silent in July 2013, WJHX broadcast a Regional Mexican music format and Spanish language programming. WJHX, along with WIXI, and WZGX, comprised the "La Jefa" radio network covering central Alabama, north Alabama, and central Tennessee.

== Programming ==
WJHX broadcast a Spanish language Mexican Regional music format to the Huntsville, Alabama, area. The station was one of three in the area that broadcast in Spanish, along with WKAC in Athens, Alabama, which broadcast some weekend programming in Spanish, and WYAM in Hartselle, Alabama.

== History ==
In July 1983, WWLX owners Wright, Wright, & Sanders agreed to sell this station to Roger W. Wright. The deal was approved by the FCC on September 6, 1983, and the transaction was consummated on September 13, 1983.

In March 1986, Roger W. Wright worked out a deal to sell WWLX to Allen Carwile. The deal was approved by the FCC on April 17, 1986, and the transaction was consummated on June 4, 1986. On March 21, 1987, the station's call letters were changed by the Federal Communications Commission to WKNI.

In December 1987, Allen Carwile made a deal to sell WKNI to Country Boy Communications, Inc. The deal was approved by the FCC on January 20, 1988, but the transaction was never consummated and Carwile retained ownership of the station. In July 1988, Allen Carwile reached a new deal to sell this station to Doris Harrison. The deal was approved by the FCC on August 29, 1988, and the transaction was consummated on September 20, 1988.

In December 1990, Doris Harrison made a deal to sell this station to Creative Broadcasting Co., Inc. The deal was approved by the FCC on February 25, 1991, but the transaction was not consummated and Harrison retained ownership of the station. In November 1991, Doris Harrison contracted to sell this station to Country Boy Communications, Inc., who had attempted to purchase the station from its previous owner back in 1988. The deal was approved by the FCC on July 26, 1992, and the transaction was consummated on February 19, 1993.

In December 1995, Country Boy Communications, Inc., reached an agreement to sell this station to Pulaski Broadcasting, Inc. The deal was approved by the FCC on February 13, 1996, and the transaction was consummated on April 10, 1996. In August 1996, Pulaski Broadcasting, Inc., agreed to sell this station to Richard W. Dabney for a reported sale price of $125,000. The deal was approved by the FCC on September 30, 1996, and the transaction was consummated on November 22, 1996. The station was assigned new callsign WZNN on May 18, 2000.

In February 2002, Richard W. Dabney contracted to sell WZNN to Manuel Huerta for a reported sale price of $100,000. The deal was approved by the FCC on April 4, 2002, and the transaction was consummated on May 30, 2002. At the time of the sale, WZNN broadcast a sports radio format. The station changed call letters to WJHX on May 13, 2004.

In February 2005, Manuel Huerta reached an agreement to sell WJHX to Bar Broadcasting, Inc. The deal was approved by the FCC on April 21, 2005, and the transaction was consummated on December 30, 2005. After resolving issues with the previous licensee, the FCC granted new licensee Bar Broadcasting's application for license renewal on March 23, 2012.

Bar Broadcasting president Pedro Zamora reported to the FCC that his broadcast facility was vandalized on July 15, 2013, and both WJHX and sister station WZGX (1450 AM) were temporarily silent. On November 4, 2013, the FCC granted WJHX special temporary authority to remain silent. Under the terms of the Telecommunications Act of 1996, as a matter of law a radio station's broadcast license is subject to automatic forfeiture and cancellation if they fail to broadcast for one full year. On September 9, 2014, the FCC notified Bar Broadcasting that their failure to resume broadcasting had led the commission to cancel the station's license. The FCC deleted the WJHX call sign from its database on October 24, 2014.

== Controversy ==
In October 2008, the FCC settled with former station licensee Manuel Huerta after he had failed to file a timely license renewal in December 2003 and failed to properly maintain the station's public file. The fine, originally assessed at $16,000, was reduced to $12,800 citing Huerta's history of compliance with FCC regulations.
