= WKXN =

- Fort Deposit, Alabama; United States
- Broadcast area: Montgomery, Alabama
- Frequency: 95.7 MHz
- Branding: K95.7

Programming
- Format: Urban contemporary

Ownership
- Owner: Roscoe Miller; (Autaugaville Radio, Inc.)
- Sister stations: WALQ, WJWZ, WKXK, WXKD, WZKD

History
- First air date: July 18, 1977

Technical information
- Licensing authority: FCC
- Facility ID: 73194
- Class: A
- ERP: 4,000 watts
- HAAT: 69 meters (226 feet)
- Transmitter coordinates: 31°50′43″N 86°38′56″W

Links
- Public license information: Public file; LMS
- Webcast: Listen Live

WKXN (95.7 FM, "K95.7") is a radio station licensed to the community of Fort Deposit, Alabama, United States, and serving the Montgomery, Alabama, area. The station is owned by Roscoe Miller, through licensee Autaugaville Radio, Inc. It airs an urban contemporary music format. The station's programming is simulcast by sister station WKXK.

The station was assigned the WKXN call letters by the Federal Communications Commission for its initial launch in 1977.

In September 1994, original owners WKXN, Inc., made a deal to sell this station to Autaugaville Radio, Inc. The deal was approved by the FCC on November 17, 1994, and the transaction was consummated on November 23, 1994.

== Translators ==
WKXN previously broadcast into Montgomery via a translator, W300AN at 107.9. This ended when class C3 outlet WMRK-FM signed on at that frequency in April 2009. A change of frequency to 102.7 was later approved, and it became W274BG.
