= WALQ =

- Carrville, Alabama; United States
- Broadcast area: Montgomery, Alabama
- Frequency: 1130 kHz
- Branding: Radio Estrella Alabama

Programming
- Format: Regional Mexican
- Affiliations: Fútbol de Primera

Ownership
- Owner: Roscoe Miller; (Autaugaville Radio, Inc.)
- Sister stations: WJWZ, WKXK, WKXN, WOAB, WXKD, WZGX, WZKD

History
- First air date: June 30, 1979
- Former call signs: WACQ (1979–1985); WSFU (1985–1987); WACQ (1987–2012)

Technical information
- Licensing authority: FCC
- Facility ID: 68309
- Class: D
- Power: 25,000 watts (day); 1,000 watts (critical hours)
- Transmitter coordinates: 32°27′17″N 85°55′57″W
- Translator: 102.7 W274BG (Montgomery)

Links
- Public license information: Public file; LMS

WALQ (1130 AM) is an American radio station licensed to serve the community of Carrville, Alabama. The station, founded in 1979 as WACQ, is owned by Roscoe Miller, through licensee Autaugaville Radio, Inc. WALQ is the flagship station of the Radio Estrella Alabama network along with sister stations WZGX in Birmingham and WOAB in Dothan.

== Programming ==
Before falling silent in June 2012, the then-WACQ broadcast an oldies music format to the greater Montgomery, Alabama, area. Since 1993, WACQ had been the home of local morning show "What's Going On", with Pete Cottle and Fred Randall Hughey as co-hosts. Trivia contests, oldies music, and local news made up the program, which aired weekday mornings. On weekends, there was a Saturday morning show hosted by local band director Michael Bird and a Sunday morning gospel music show.

The station also aired a local newscast four times daily and network news every hour from the Alabama Radio Network and Citadel Media. Sports programming included the Alabama Crimson Tide Sports Network, Atlanta Braves baseball, and Reeltown Rebels high school football.

The bulk of this programming shifted to WBIL (580 AM) on June 28, 2012.

== History ==
=== Early days ===
In 1977, Hughey Broadcasting Company, Inc., applied to the U.S. Federal Communications Commission (FCC) for a construction permit for a new broadcast radio station. The FCC granted this permit on February 8, 1979. This new station would broadcast with 1,000 watts of power on a frequency of 1130 kilohertz, but only during daylight hours to protect KWKH in Shreveport, Louisiana, CKWX in Vancouver, British Columbia, and WBBR in New York City from skywave interference. The station was assigned call sign "WACQ". After construction and testing were completed, the station was granted its broadcast license on August 6, 1979.

In May 1984, Hughey Broadcasting Company, Inc., agreed to sell WACQ to Buck Helms Broadcasting. The FCC approved the sale on June 27, 1984, and the transaction was completed on November 15, 1984. In July 1985, control of Buck Helms Broadcasting was transferred from Thelma P. Helms to A.B. "Buck" Helms. The FCC approved the move on July 30, 1985. The licensee had the station's call sign changed to "WSFU" on August 26, 1985.

In December 1985, A.B. "Buck" Helms, doing business as Buck Helms Broadcasting, made a deal to transfer control of the radio station to original owner Fred Randall Hughey's Double H. Broadcasting, Inc. The FCC approved the assignment of license on May 6, 1986. Hughey had the FCC restore the original "WACQ" call sign on June 2, 1987.

=== 1990s ===
In June 1989, Double H Broadcasting, Inc., made a deal to sell WACQ to Richard P. Smith. The deal gained FCC acceptance on July 27, 1989, but the transaction was never completed. In November 1991, Double H Broadcasting transferred ownership of WACQ to Tiger Broadcasting Company, Inc. The FCC approved the deal on March 9, 1992, and the transaction was completed on March 26, 1992.

This ownership was short-lived as in May 1994, Tiger Broadcasting Company, Inc., contracted to transfer WACQ's broadcast license to Tuskegee Communications Company, Inc. The FCC approved the move on June 29, 1994, and it was completed on August 31, 1994. Just months later, in January 1995, Tuskegee Communications Company, Inc., applied to the FCC to transfer WACQ to a new company called WACQ, Inc. The deal was approved by the FCC on February 14, 1995, and the transaction occurred on April 14, 1995.

In June 1996, Tuskegee Communications Company, Inc., filed to transfer WACQ to Tiger Communications, Inc. The FCC approved the move on July 31, 1996, and the deal was completed on September 13, 1996. In January 1998, Tiger Communications, Inc., in turn filed an application to send the WACQ license to Hughey Communications, Inc. The move was approved by the FCC on March 9, 1998, and the transaction was completed on May 12, 1998.

=== 2000s ===
In October 1999, Hughey Communications, Inc., made a deal to sell the station to Progressive United Communications, Inc., of Heathrow, Florida. The deal gained FCC approval on December 10, 1999, and the transaction was completed on February 3, 2000.

In July 2006, Progressive United Communications, Inc., transferred WACQ back to Hughey Communications, Inc. The FCC approved the transfer on September 8, 2006, and the deal was completed on December 4, 2006. Hughey Communications agreed to pay Progressive United Communications $106,000 plus forgive $50,000 in debt in exchange for the return of the WACQ broadcast license and station assets. This deal came as settlement of a 2003 civil suit between Hughey Communications and Progressive United Communications.

In August 2006, Hughey Communications applied to the FCC to increase this class D station's daytime-only power from 1,000 to 25,000 watts. Whereas with the original 1,000 watt signal the station could operate at full power from sun-up to sunset, the new 25,000 watt power authorization means operating at sharply lower levels (1,000 watts) from sign-on until two hours after sunrise then again from two hours before sunset until sign-off to prevent skywave interference with KWKH, CKWX, and WBBR. The FCC granted a construction permit for this change on August 21, 2007, with an expiration date of August 21, 2010. With testing completed in October 2008, the station applied for a new broadcast license and this was granted on November 25, 2008.

=== 2010s ===
In 2006, WP Media Lending loaned Hughey Communications $225,000. This was rolled over into a "First Replacement Promissory Note" in March 2008, then a second note in November 2008, and a third in March 2009. The loan was declared in default in February 2010. In April 2011, Hughey Communications, Inc., filed an application with the FCC to transfer WACQ to Westburg Broadcasting Montgomery, LLC. The FCC approved the deal on May 24, 2011, and the transaction was completed on June 16, 2011. The transfer of ownership was in settlement of the defaulted loan from WP Media Lending to Hughey Communications that, as of December 31, 2010, had increased to $494.662.16 owed. This total included $402,527 in principal, plus unpaid interest, and legal fees.

Fred Randall Hughey, former owner, temporarily continued to operate WACQ under a joint operating agreement with the new owners. Under the terms of the deal, Hughey Communications retained the rights to the "WACQ" call sign and announced plans to relocate them and the station's current programming to another station, then licensed as WBIL, in which he held partial ownership.

Westburg Broadcasting Montgomery, LLC, principal David Westburg also owns Alabama radio stations WINL in Linden, and WXAL and WZNJ in Demopolis (all licensed to Westburg Broadcasting Alabama, LLC) plus stations in Colorado and New Mexico.

=== Falling silent ===
On October 20, 2011, Westburg Broadcasting Montgomery requested that the FCC grant the station special temporary authority to operate WACQ with reduced power. In support of the request, the licensee stated that it acquired the WACQ license as part of a foreclosure on the station and that the "current economic conditions combined with the less than successful operation of the station by the previous licensee" continued to require WACQ to either operate with reduced power or cease operation. This authority was granted on October 24, 2011. On March 9, 2012, Westburg Broadcasting Montgomery applied for an extension of the special temporary authority, citing the same economic conditions as in the original application. This was request approved by the FCC and is scheduled to expire on September 9, 2012.

As of June 29, 2012, the station is temporarily dark for financial reasons and seeking authorization from the U.S. Federal Communications Commission (FCC) to remain silent for up to one year. Under the terms of the Telecommunications Act of 1996, as a matter of law a radio station's broadcast license is subject to automatic forfeiture and cancellation if they fail to broadcast for one full year.

On July 19, 2012, the station's call sign was changed to WALQ.

On October 10, 2015, WALQ returned to the air with a country music format.

=== Present day ===
In October 2020, WALQ went silent.

On November 30, 2020, Westburg Broadcasting Montgomery sold WALQ to Augustus Foundation, Inc. for $40,000.

Three years later, in late 2023, after Augustus Foundation sold the radio station back to Hughey Communications, they sold WALQ to Roscoe Miller's Autaugaville Radio. Shortly after, WALQ flipped to Regional Mexican and formed the statewide Radio Estrella Alabama network with two other stations, WZGX in Birmingham and WOAB in Dothan.
