= WSMX =

WSMX may refer to:

- WSMX (AM), a radio station (1500 AM) licensed to serve Winston-Salem, North Carolina, United States
- WSMX-FM, a radio station (100.3 FM) licensed to serve Goshen, Alabama, United States
- WSMX-LP, a defunct radio station (98.3 FM) formerly licensed to serve Clanton, Alabama
