= Markwell =

Markwell is a surname. Notable people with the surname include:

- Diego Markwell (born 1980), Dutch baseball player
- Don Markwell, talk radio personality in Montgomery, Alabama
- Donald Markwell (born 1959), Australian social scientist and college president
- Kathleen Markwell (1896-1973), pianist, wife of Hiawatha Coleridge-Taylor
- Terry Markwell an American born actress, born in Phoenix, Arizona
