= WBAM-FM =

- Montgomery, Alabama; United States
- Frequency: 98.9 MHz
- Branding: Bama Country 98.9

Programming
- Format: Country
- Affiliations: Fox News Radio

Ownership
- Owner: Bluewater Broadcasting Company, LLC; (Bluewater Broadcasting Company, LLC)
- Sister stations: WACV, WGMP, WJWZ, WQKS-FM

History
- First air date: March 2, 1961
- Former call signs: WFMI (1961–1978)
- Call sign meaning: Alabama

Technical information
- Licensing authority: FCC
- Facility ID: 16379
- Class: C1
- ERP: 100,000 watts
- HAAT: 299 meters (981 ft)
- Transmitter coordinates: 31°58′28″N 86°11′31″W

Links
- Public license information: Public file; LMS
- Webcast: Listen live
- Website: bamacountry.com

WBAM-FM (98.9 FM, "Bama Country 98.9") is a country music formatted radio station that serves the Montgomery metropolitan area, licensed to Montgomery, Alabama. The station is locally owned and operated by Bluewater Broadcasting Company, LLC. The station's transmitter is located in the town of Grady, Alabama. The station's studios are located on Wall St. in Midtown Montgomery. WBAM also participates in Montgomery rating surveys and is monitored by Mediabase.

== History ==
On March 2, 1961, the 98.9 frequency was home to easy listening-formatted WFMI. The station was bought by the Brennan family on December 1978, and changed its call letters to WBAM-FM.

=== Pre-Bama Country ===
WBAM was also known as "Oldies 98"; and then "Star 98.9", a Top 40 formatted station, in the late-1990s and early-2000s.

=== The birth of Bama Country ===
In April 2004 John Garrett announced on air, "he wanted to play an Alan Jackson record instead". That's when Bama Country was born. WBAM-FM has held on to its heritage call letters while returning to its roots as a country music formatted radio station. The station is still imaged on-air (although not exclusively) as "The Big BAM in Montgomery".

During the first three years as "Bama Country" the station put on a series of concerts known as "The Bama Country Birthday Bash" with many of today's top country music artists.

== Bama Country Today ==
Since 2004, WBAM has broadcast a mainstream country format. The majority of the music played on WBAM tends to be newer and from more recent artists. Core artists include: Keith Urban, Brad Paisley, Toby Keith, Taylor Swift, Carrie Underwood, Lady Antebellum, Rascal Flatts, Jason Aldean, and more. Legendary artists and songs are reserved for a weekly show titled: Legends Saturday Night which is hosted by JR "Bubba" Cullpepper.

WBAM also features news and weather updates from CBS 8 WAKA, national news updates from Fox News Radio, and traffic from Montgomery Skywatch Traffic.

=== Current Staff and Programming ===
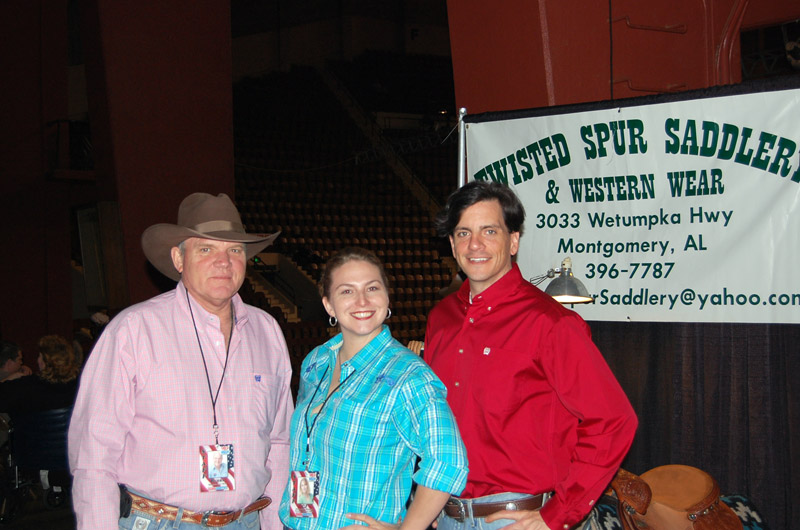
Announcer JR "Bubba" Cullpepper, CJ, and John Garrett live on location (2010)

Notable local programming on WBAM includes: John Garrett, Dr. Sam Faulk, and JR "Bubba" Culpepper. Other programs include: Legends Saturday Night, American Country Countdown with Kix Brooks, Bob Kingsley's Country Top 40 and Rise up Country. WBAM-FM is also a Fox News Radio affiliate.

=== Technical information ===
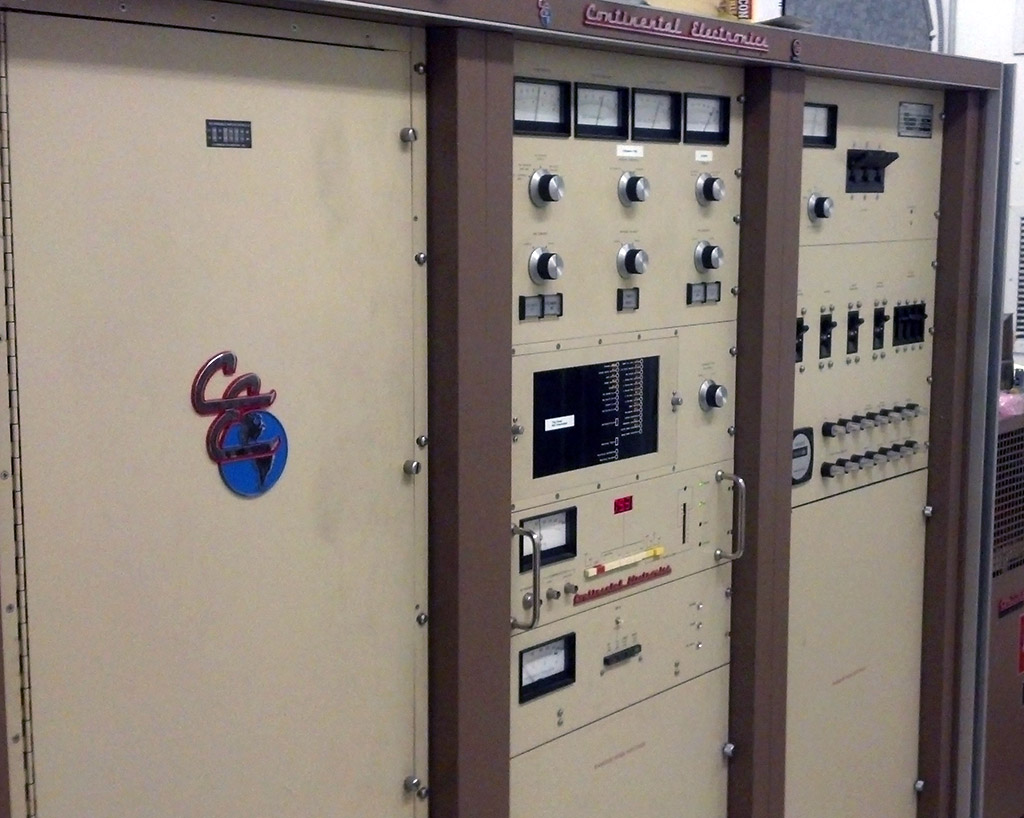
WBAM's Transmitter (2013)

For several years the WBAM-FM transmitter broadcast from the 1,100-foot (340 m) Montgomery Tower Partnership behind the Eastdale Mall in Montgomery, Alabama. The antenna is a shared panel which still broadcasts several other local FM radio stations.

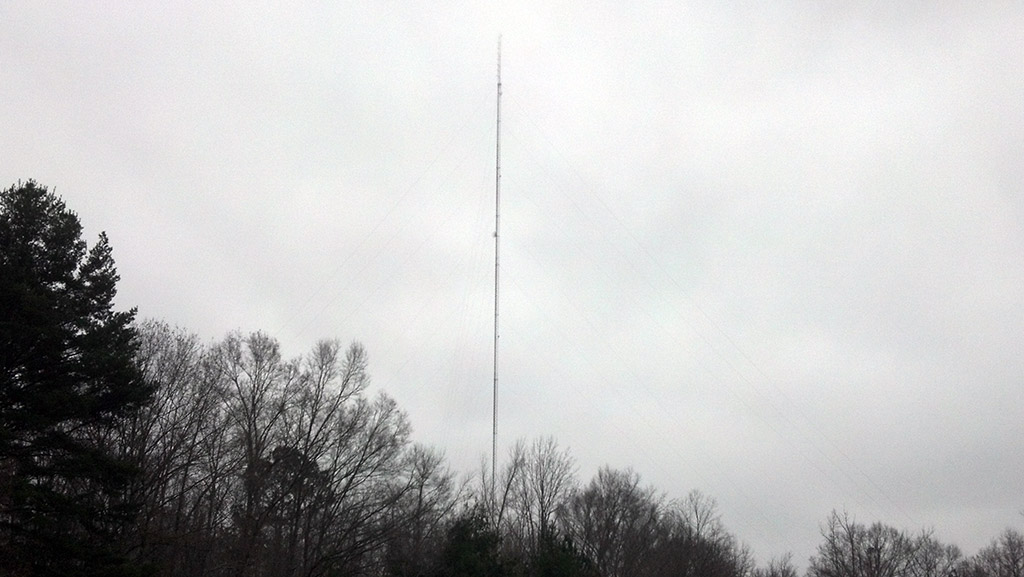
WBAM's Broadcast Tower (2013)

In the late 1990s Cox Communications wanted to move a station into the Birmingham, Alabama radio market. In order to meet Minimum Distance Separation Requirements set by the Federal Communications Commission (FCC), WBAM-FM had to first be re-located. The re-location was funded by Cox Communications and the new 1,049-foot (320 m) tower is located a few miles from the WSFA-TV tower in Grady, Alabama.

WBAM-FM broadcasts with a transmitter power output of 30.26 kW using a Continental Electronics transmitter into an 8-Bay Shively Labs Super-High-Power 6814 non-directional antenna.

WBAM-FM Longely-Rice Coverage Map

=== Coverage information ===
Because WBAM's antenna is nearly 1,400-foot (430 m) above sea level, it blankets Central and Southeast Alabama. WBAM can be heard in the Columbus, Georgia-Auburn, Alabama Combined Statistical Area, Alexander City Micropolitan Statistical Area, Dothan, Alabama metropolitan area and parts of the Florida Panhandle. WBAM is often received by many DXing enthusiasts, some as far away as Toms River, New Jersey.

=== Ownership ===
In March 2004, Deep South Broadcasting Co. (Bob Brennen, owner) reached an agreement to sell this station to Bluewater Broadcasting Company, LLC. The sale was part of a multi-company four-station deal valued at a reported $15.3 million. The deal was approved by the FCC on April 21, 2004, and the transaction was consummated on June 21, 2004. At the time of the sale, WBAM-FM was broadcasting a Top 40 format.

== Awards and honors ==
Paul Simpkins, an original WBAM on-air personality from the time of the station's launch in 1953 until the sale in 1984, received a number of honors during his more than three decades with the station. These include being named Sterling Magazine Personality of the Month and TV Radio Mirror Personality of the Month in 1967, 1968 and 1972. Simpkins was inducted into the Country Music DJ Hall of Fame in 1998.

Cyril Brennan, the general manager and program director of WBAM, was named the 1976 "Program Director of the Year for Country Music" by Billboard magazine's International Radio Programming Forum.

== Popular culture ==
WBAM is name-checked with "This is country country on WBAM coming to you live, neighbor" in the poem "Pickup" by American poet Paul Allen.

Alabama author Paul Hemphill included references to WBAM in his 1979 novel Long Gone as the preferred radio station of the protagonist, Jamie Weeks. In 1987, Long Gone was made into a movie starring Dermot Mulroney by HBO Films.

== History of call letters ==
The call letters WBAM were previously assigned to an FM station in New York City. That station's call letters were changed to WOR-FM June 13, 1948.
