= WJAM =

- Selma, Alabama; United States
- Frequency: 1340 kHz
- Branding: Jammin 94.7FM 1340 AM

Programming
- Format: Urban Adult Contemporary
- Affiliations: The Touch (Westwood One)

Ownership
- Owner: Scott Communications, Inc.; (Scott Communications, Inc.)
- Sister stations: WALX, WMRK-FM

History
- First air date: December 19, 1946
- Former call signs: WGWC (1946–1968); WAMA (1968–1977); WMRK (1978–2009)
- Call sign meaning: Jammin’

Technical information
- Licensing authority: FCC
- Facility ID: 947
- Class: C
- Power: 1,000 watts
- Transmitter coordinates: 32°25′31″N 86°59′47″W
- Translator: 94.7 W234DM (Selma)

Links
- Public license information: Public file; LMS

WJAM (1340 AM) is a radio station licensed to serve Selma, Alabama, United States. Originally launched in 1946, the station is currently owned by Scott Communications, Inc., and the WJAM broadcast license is held by Scott Communications, Inc.

== Programming ==
WJAM broadcasts an urban adult contemporary music format. Notable syndicated weeknight talk programming once included Larry King Live and The Jim Bohannon Show.

WJAM has broadcast Sunday morning services of the First Presbyterian Church of Selma for more than 40 years.

== History ==
This station first began regular broadcast operations on December 19, 1946, as a full-time 250 watt station licensed to serve Selma, Alabama. Original owner G.W. Covington Jr. had the station assigned the call letters WGWC after his own initials. Covington died in 1949 and his estate transferred the license for WGWC to Dallas Broadcasters Inc., owned by Oscar Covington.

Judge W.E. Farrar acquired Dallas Broadcasters Inc. on October 10, 1958. This ownership change would prove short-lived as on August 1, 1961, WGWC was acquired by Robert J. Martin.

In 1964 the station increased the strength of its daytime signal to 1,000 watts while maintaining a 250 watt nighttime signal. The station took on a new call sign in 1968 with a change to WAMA. The newly renamed WAMA changed hands again on February 1, 1969, when it was acquired by the Vogel-Hendrix Corporation.

In 1976 WAMA hit on hard times due to bad management and went off the air. The license was deleted. In 1977, a new station at 1340 was applied for by Thomas E. Alexander's Alexander Broadcasting Co., Inc. Now a sister station to WALX, the station was assigned new call letters WMRK by the Federal Communications Commission. WMRK went on the air in the spring of 1978 from the transmitter site and tower which had been used by WAMA. All new transmission equipment was used to put the station back on the air. At the same time a new studio/control room was built for WALX, WMRK inherited the old WALX studio/control room.

After the death of Thomas E. Alexander in April 1989, control of Alexander Broadcasting Co., Inc., was passed by his estate to his widow, Betty Hunt Alexander. The transfer was approved by the FCC on June 9, 1989, and the transaction was completed on June 20, 1989.

Betty Alexander hosted the morning show on WMRK from the time her husband acquired the station in 1975 until her death in November 2004. In March 2005, the estate of Betty Alexander filed with the FCC to take control of Alexander Broadcasting Co., Inc. The transfer of control was approved by the FCC on April 20, 2005, and completed on April 26, 2005. In November 2005, the estate applied to transfer control of the company to Paul Scott Alexander, a son of Betty Alexander. The transfer was approved by the FCC on December 30, 2005, and completed on January 3, 2006.

In January 2006, Alexander Broadcasting Co., Inc., agreed to transfer the broadcast license for WMRK to Scott Communications, Inc. The deal was approved by the FCC on January 27, 2006, and the transaction was consummated on January 28, 2006.

On March 23, 2009, WMRK swapped callsigns with FM sister station WJAM-FM to become WJAM and WMRK-FM, respectively.

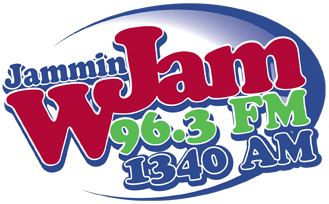
Logo while using the 96.3 translator

On March 27, 2009 WJAM changed their format from talk to urban adult contemporary.
