= WZGX =

Simulcasts WALQ 1130 Carrville
- Bessemer, Alabama; United States
- Broadcast area: Birmingham, Alabama
- Frequency: 1450 kHz
- Branding: Radio Estrella Alabama

Programming
- Format: Regional Mexican
- Affiliations: Fútbol de Primera

Ownership
- Owner: Roscoe Miller; (Autaugaville Radio, Inc.)
- Sister stations: WALQ, WOAB

History
- Former call signs: WBCO (1950–1958); WENN (1958–1959); WEZB (1959–1960); WYAM (1960–1980); WSMQ (1980–2004)

Technical information
- Licensing authority: FCC
- Facility ID: 4926
- Class: C
- Power: 1,000 watts (unlimited)
- Transmitter coordinates: 33°25′23.00″N 86°57′17.00″W
- Translator: 94.1 W231DE (Birmingham)

Links
- Public license information: Public file; LMS

WZGX (1450 AM) is an American radio station licensed to serve the community of Bessemer, Alabama. The station, founded in 1950 as WBCO, is owned by Roscoe Miller, through licensee Autaugaville Radio, Inc. It ceased broadcasting on July 15, 2013, but resumed broadcasting in December 2014, then fell silent again since March 25, 2019 and has since resumed broadcasting.

== Programming ==
Under Autaugaville Radio, WZGX broadcasts a Regional Mexican format simulcasting the statewide Spanish language radio network Radio Estrella Alabama along with their sister stations WALQ in Montgomery and WOAB in the Dothan area.

== History ==
Jess Lanier, then mayor of Bessemer, established this station in 1950 through his Bessemer Broadcasting Company. The original WBCO call sign stood for "Bessemer Cutoff", named for a quirk in Jefferson County government granting the city special status.

Lanier sold the Bessemer Broadcasting Company and WBCO to John M. McClendon in July 1958. The station's call sign was changed to WENN. McClendon sold the company and station to Gene Newman in July 1959. The call sign was changed to WEZB. In April 1960, the station was acquired by Trans-America Broadcasting Corporation, the format was changed to country music and the call sign to WYAM.

A company dubbed WYAM, Inc., and owned by Nesuhi Ertegon purchased the station in May 1969. WYAM was purchased by the Brandon Robison Broadcasting Corporation in October 1972. WYAM was sold to Mel Allen Broadcasting, Inc., in a deal that was consummated on January 1, 1976. On October 20, 1980, the station's call sign was changed to WSMQ.

In August 1982, station owner Mel Allen Broadcasting, Inc., reached a deal to transfer the broadcast license for WSMQ to C.S. Broadcasting, Inc. The FCC approved the deal on August 13, 1982, and the transaction was consummated on September 22, 1982. In March 1984, C.S. Broadcasting, Inc. agreed to transfer the station's license back to Mel Allen Broadcasting, Inc. The FCC approved the move on March 22, 1984, and the transaction was consummated on April 30, 1984.

In July 1988, Mel Allen Broadcasting, Inc., reached a deal to transfer the station's construction permit and broadcast license to Bessemer Radio, Inc. The FCC approved the deal on July 18, 1988, and the transaction was consummated on August 29, 1988. In March 1999, license holder Bessemer Radio, Inc., reached a deal to transfer the station's broadcast license to Powernomics Birmingham, LLC. The FCC approved the deal on March 15, 1999, but the transaction was never consummated.

On December 9, 2003, station owner Bessemer Radio, Inc., reached a deal to transfer the station's assets and broadcast license to Bar Broadcasting, Inc., for $350,000. The FCC approved the deal on December 15, 2003, and the transaction was eventually consummated on June 1, 2004. That same day, the station's call sign was changed from WSMQ to WZGX.

Under Bar Broadcasting ownership, WZGX broadcast a Regional Mexican music format to the greater Birmingham, Alabama, area. Along with former sister stations WJHX and WIXI, WZGX was part of the La Jefa Spanish language broadcasting network covering north and central Alabama.

=== Falling silent, then return to the air ===
Bar Broadcasting president Pedro Zamora reported to the FCC that his broadcast facility was vandalized on July 15, 2013, and both WZGX and sister station WJHX (620 AM) were temporarily silent. On November 4, 2013, the FCC granted WZGX special temporary authority to remain silent. Under the terms of the Telecommunications Act of 1996, as a matter of law a radio station's broadcast license is subject to automatic forfeiture and cancellation if they fail to broadcast for one full year. On September 9, 2014, the FCC notified Bar Broadcasting that their failure to resume broadcasting had led the Commission to cancel the station's license. The FCC deleted the WZGX call sign from its database on October 28, 2014. However, the station resumed broadcasting in December of the same year.

Effective November 29, 2017, Bar Broadcasting sold WZGX to Lyle Reynolds' Red Mountain Ventures, LLC for $200,000. On March 12, 2024, Red Mountain Ventures sold the station to Roscoe Miller’s Autaugaville Radio for $20,000, where it would become a simulcast station as part of a statewide Spanish language radio network, Radio Estrella Alabama, alongside WALQ in Montgomery and WOAB in Dothan.
