= WZNJ =

- Demopolis, Alabama; United States
- Frequency: 106.5 MHz
- Branding: 106.5 The River

Programming
- Format: Urban contemporary–Urban oldies
- Affiliations: The Steve Harvey Morning Show (Premiere Networks); The Touch (Westwood One)

Ownership
- Owner: Westburg Broadcasting Alabama, LLC
- Sister stations: WINL, WALQ

History
- First air date: 1975; 51 years ago
- Former call signs: WNAN (1975–1986)
- Call sign meaning: Nan Jordan (wife of the station's original owner)

Technical information
- Licensing authority: FCC
- Facility ID: 61424
- Class: C3
- ERP: 25,000 watts
- HAAT: 93 meters (305 ft)
- Transmitter coordinates: 32°30′08″N 87°49′07″W
- Repeater: 1400 WXAL (Demopolis)

Links
- Public license information: Public file; LMS
- Webcast: Listen live
- Website: www.znj1065.com

WZNJ (106.5 FM, The River) is an American radio station licensed to serve the community of Demopolis, Alabama. Since August 2011, the station has been owned by Westburg Broadcasting Alabama, LLC. It previously aired a classic hits music format branded as "The River". On June 3, 2015, it flipped to Urban Contemporary and Urban Oldies, under the same River branding. Syndicated programming includes The Steve Harvey Morning Show Monday-Saturday. The station was assigned the "WZNJ" call sign by the U.S. Federal Communications Commission (FCC) on August 4, 1986.
