= WOZK =

Simulcasts WZKD 950 Montgomery
- Ozark, Alabama; United States
- Broadcast area: Dothan, Alabama
- Frequency: 900 kHz
- Branding: The Big KD

Programming
- Format: Urban adult contemporary

Ownership
- Owner: Roscoe Miller; (Autaugaville Radio, Inc.)
- Sister stations: WOAB, WXKD, WZKD

History
- First air date: May 3, 1953
- Call sign meaning: W OZarK

Technical information
- Licensing authority: FCC
- Facility ID: 51092
- Class: D
- Power: 1,000 watts day 70 watts night
- Transmitter coordinates: 31°27′19″N 85°40′58″W
- Translator: 98.1 W251DE (Ozark)

Links
- Public license information: Public file; LMS

WOZK (900 AM) is a radio station licensed to serve Ozark, Alabama, United States. The station, which began broadcasting in 1953, is owned by Roscoe Miller, through licensee Autaugaville Radio, Inc.
