= Don Markwell =

Donald Markwell (January 29, 1936 – March 25, 2011) was a talk radio personality in Montgomery, Alabama. He was born in Central City, Kentucky, and began his radio career as a disc jockey in 1956 and died at his Montgomery home on March 25, 2011.

Don arrived in Montgomery, Alabama in March 1959 and took a job as an overnight DJ on WCOV radio. In 1967, Don created Alabama's first call-in talk radio show on WCOV, later moving to the now-defunct radio station WQTY-AM 1000, which originated from the Frank Leu Building in downtown Montgomery. Markwell also served as Vice President and General Manager of Colonial Broadcasting's WLWI-FM 92.3 for many years and built a formidable broadcast company consisting of many stations before returning to the talk radio format on the new WACV AM 1170 in 1986.

As VP/GM of Colonial Broadcasting, Don Markwell generated Arbitron ratings in the company's first 3 months of broadcasting never before seen in the Montgomery radio market. Markwell destroyed the ratings of self proclaimed market leader Larry Stephens, who, for several years, had been Montgomery's top disc jockey. After Markwell took over the helm of Colonial Broadcasting, Stephens was never able to match the success of Markwell and never fully recovered from the blow to his delicate ego.

After years of broadcast excellence, Don celebrated his fiftieth year in broadcasting on June 18, 2006. Don retired from radio on August 29, 2008, with a final sendoff show broadcast on WACV. Don died in his home from congenital heart failure at 4:45pm, March 25, 2011.

In 2018, Don was posthumously inducted into the Alabama Broadcasters Hall of Fame. That year, the ABA also created an award named for him, The “Don Markwell Sentinel”, which "recognizes excellence in reporting that highlights the importance of a free press and open government."

Don Markwell was known as a bibliophile as well as a mentor to those who loved the art of radio broadcasting. Markwell mentored some of the most award-winning DJs in the history of Montgomery radio.

Don always said he wanted to be remembered as “an old radio bum.”
