= WOAB =

Simulcasts WALQ 1130 Carrville
- Ozark, Alabama; United States
- Frequency: 104.9 MHz
- Branding: Radio Estrella Alabama

Programming
- Format: Regional Mexican
- Affiliations: Fútbol de Primera

Ownership
- Owner: Roscoe Miller; (Autaugaville Radio, Inc.)
- Sister stations: WALQ, WOZK, WZGX

History
- First air date: July 9, 1967
- Call sign meaning: Ozark AlaBama

Technical information
- Licensing authority: FCC
- Facility ID: 51095
- Class: A
- ERP: 6,000 watts
- HAAT: 82 meters (269 feet)
- Transmitter coordinates: 31°27′19″N 85°40′58″W

Links
- Public license information: Public file; LMS

WOAB (104.9 FM) is a radio station licensed to serve Ozark, Alabama, United States. The station, which first signed on in 1967, is owned by Roscoe Miller, through licensee Autaugaville Radio, Inc.

WOAB broadcasts a Regional Mexican format with the station, along with WZGX in Birmingham, Alabama simulcasting WALQ in Montgomery, Alabama as part of the Radio Estrella Alabama network.

== History ==
WOAB signed on the air on July 9, 1967, with 2,850 watts of effective radiated power on 104.9 MHz. Owned by the Ozark Broadcasting Company, this new FM station signed on as a separately-programmed sister station to WOZK (900 AM). The station aired a primarily country music format through the 1970s.

Effective July 7, 2021, Ozark Broadcasting sold WOAB, WOZK, and the construction permit for translator W252DV to Fred Dockins' Dockins Communications for $125,000.

On February 23, 2022 WOAB changed formats from oldies to country, branded as "Kickin' Country 104.9".

As of April 2024, following Dockins Commmunications' sale of the station to Roscoe Miller's Autaugaville Radio, WOAB flipped to Regional Mexican as a simulcast of WALQ in Montgomery and their statewide Radio Estrella Alabama network. WZGX in Birmingham would join the network later that same year.
