= WDXX =

- Selma, Alabama; United States
- Frequency: 100.1 MHz
- Branding: Dixie Country

Programming
- Format: Country
- Affiliations: Premiere Networks

Ownership
- Owner: Broadsouth Communications, Inc.
- Sister stations: WHBB, WINL

History
- First air date: October 17, 1965
- Former call signs: WHBB-FM (1965–1969); WTUN (1969–1989)
- Call sign meaning: Dixie X

Technical information
- Licensing authority: FCC
- Facility ID: 27455
- Class: C2
- ERP: 50,000 watts
- HAAT: 150 meters (490 ft)
- Transmitter coordinates: 32°22′54″N 86°56′37″W

Links
- Public license information: Public file; LMS
- Website: dixiecountry.net

WDXX (100.1 FM, "Dixie Country") is a radio station licensed to serve Selma, Alabama, United States. The station is owned by Broadsouth Communications, Inc. It airs a country music format and features programming from Premiere Radio Networks.

The station went on the air on October 17, 1965, as the first automated FM station in Alabama.

WHBB-FM changed its call letters to WTUN in 1969.

On August 26, 2012, WDXX changed their format from country to adult hits, branded as "Fuzion 100".

On October 7, 2013, WDXX changed their format back to country, branded as "Dixie Country".
