= WMRK-FM =

Radio station in Shorter, Alabama

- Shorter, Alabama; United States
- Broadcast area: Montgomery, Alabama
- Frequency: 107.9 MHz (HD Radio)

Programming
- Format: Contemporary Christian
- Subchannels: HD2: AFR Talk; HD3: Praise 96.5 (Black Gospel)
- Affiliations: K-Love

Ownership
- Owner: Educational Media Foundation; (Alexander Broadcasting Company, LLC)
- Sister stations: WALX, WJAM

History
- First air date: 1994
- Former call signs: WJAM-FM (1983–2009)
- Former frequencies: 97.3 MHz (1994–2004)
- Call sign meaning: named for Mark Alexander

Technical information
- Licensing authority: FCC
- Facility ID: 59383
- Class: C3
- ERP: 25,000 watts
- HAAT: 100 meters (330 ft)
- Transmitter coordinates: 32°21′09″N 86°03′06″W
- Translators: HD2: 92.7 W224CR (Montgomery); HD3: 96.5 W243CS (Montgomery)

Links
- Public license information: Public file; LMS
- Webcast: Listen Live afr.net (HD2); Praise 96.5 Webstream (HD3)
- Website: klove.com afr.net (HD2) praise965.com (HD3)

WMRK-FM (107.9 FM) is a radio station licensed to serve Shorter, Alabama, United States. The station is operated under a local marketing agreement by Educational Media Foundation (K-LOVE), with Alexander Broadcasting Company is the licensee.

WMRK-FM broadcasts a Contemporary Christian format serving the Montgomery, Alabama, market.

== History ==
This station received its original construction permit from the Federal Communications Commission on November 19, 1982. The new station was assigned the call letters WJAM-FM by the FCC on February 14, 1983. After more than a decade of extensions, renewals, transfers, and construction, WJAM-FM finally received its license to cover from the FCC on March 14, 1995.

In July 1986, Marion Communications, Inc., applied to the FCC to transfer the permit to build this station to Marion Radio, Inc. The deal was approved by the FCC on September 30, 1986, and the transaction was consummated on December 30, 1987.

In March 1994, Marion Radio, Inc., reached an agreement to sell the construction permit for this station to Scott Communications, Inc. The deal was approved by the FCC on October 13, 1994, and the transaction was consummated on October 17, 1994.

In March 2009, Scott Communications, Inc., applied to the FCC to transfer the broadcast license for WJAM-FM to Alexander Broadcasting Company. The application was approved by the FCC on March 23, 2009, and the transaction was consummated on April 2, 2009.

On July 21, 2008, WJAM-FM was granted a modified construction permit to change the station's city of license from Orrville, Alabama, to Shorter, Alabama; upgrade to a class C3 station with 25,000 watts of effective radiated power; and relocate the transmitter site east to 32°21'09"N, 86°03'06"W. The station received a license to cover these changes on May 8, 2009.

On March 23, 2009, WJAM-FM swapped callsigns with AM sister station WMRK to become WMRK-FM and WJAM, respectively.

Bluewater Broadcasting Company, LLC began broadcasting on WMRK-FM under a local marketing agreement as a simulcast of news/talk WACV (1170 AM) on April 2, 2009. The simulcast ended in November 2009 with news/talk programming shifting to the FM station and the AM station switching to an oldies music format. On September 1, 2012 WMRK-FM flipped to K-LOVE and the news talk programming went back to WACV.

In May 2015, EMF announced that they would be leasing the HD-2 of the station to the American Family Association of Tupelo, Mississippi, for $500 a month. It's unknown when the HD-2 is scheduled to go live, but the owners filed a digital notification for HD broadcasting in late July. Almost a year later, in June 2016, the station added an HD-3 carrying a gospel/praise format called "Praise 96.5", feeding a translator in town. (Taken from Alabama Broadcast Media Page) As of this update, AFR has yet to be heard on the HD-2 Channel. As of December 1, 2016 AFR Talk is now being heard on the HD-2 channel and is feeding the new 92.7 FM relay in Montgomery.

== Programming ==
WMRK-FM carries nationally syndicated programming from EMF Broadcasting's "K-Love" format. On their HD-3 and 96.5 FM Relay they carry Black Gospel under the name of Praise 96.5 FM. (The relay covers Montgomery) On their HD-2 and 92.7 FM Relay they carry AFR Talk. (The relay covers Montgomery)
