= WKXK =

Simulcasts WKXN 95.7 Fort Deposit
- Pine Hill, Alabama; United States
- Broadcast area: Black Belt Section of Alabama
- Frequency: 96.7 MHz
- Branding: K96.7

Programming
- Format: Urban contemporary (WKXN simulcast)

Ownership
- Owner: Roscoe Miller; (Autaugaville Radio, Inc.)
- Sister stations: WALQ, WJWZ, WKXN, WXKD, WZKD

History
- First air date: 1999
- Call sign meaning: Disambiguation of sister station WKXN

Technical information
- Licensing authority: FCC
- Facility ID: 76747
- Class: C2
- ERP: 41,000 watts
- HAAT: 163 meters (535 feet)
- Transmitter coordinates: 32°4′24″N 87°35′27″W

Links
- Public license information: Public file; LMS
- Webcast: Listen Live
- Website: thebigkd.com

WKXK (96.7 FM, "The Big KD") is a radio station licensed to serve Pine Hill, Alabama, United States. The station is owned by Autaugaville Radio, Inc.

It broadcasts an urban contemporary music format as a simulcast of sister station WKXN.

== History ==
This station received its original construction permit from the Federal Communications Commission on April 30, 1996. The new station was assigned the call letters WKXK by the FCC on April 1, 1998. WKXK received its license to cover from the FCC on January 8, 2001.
