= WHBB =

- Selma, Alabama; United States
- Frequency: 1490 kHz

Programming
- Format: Conservative talk and Gospel music

Ownership
- Owner: Broadsouth Communications, Inc.
- Sister stations: WDXX

History
- First air date: November 11, 1935
- Call sign meaning: Heart of the Black Belt

Technical information
- Licensing authority: FCC
- Facility ID: 27454
- Class: C
- Power: 1000 watts (unlimited)
- Transmitter coordinates: 32°26′02″N 87°00′40″W

Links
- Public license information: Public file; LMS

WHBB (1490 AM) is a radio station licensed to serve Selma, Alabama, United States. The station is owned by Broadsouth Communications, Inc. WHBB serves the greater Central Alabama region with a 1,000 watt signal at 1490 kHz.

== Programming ==
WHBB airs a variety format featuring a mix of news, talk and Gospel music. News coverage is delivered locally 12 times daily, and as hourly news updates from Fox News Radio.

== History ==
The station, assigned the WHBB call letters by the Federal Communications Commission, signed on November 11, 1935, with a 250 watt signal.

In July 1984, WHBB applied to increase its maximum broadcast power to 1,000 watts and relocate the transmitter to its current location. It received a construction permit from the FCC on November 9, 1984. WHBB received a license to cover the new signal strength from the FCC on January 31, 1985.

In September 1984, Talton Broadcasting Company reached an agreement to sell this station to Holder Communications Corporation. The deal was approved by the FCC on November 14, 1984, and the transaction was consummated on January 10, 1985.

In June 1992, Holder Communications Corporation completed a deal to sell WHBB to Broadsouth Communications, Inc. The deal was approved by the FCC on July 24, 1992, and the transaction was consummated on August 4, 1992.
