= WXKD =

Simulcasts WZKD 950 Montgomery
- Brantley, Alabama; United States
- Frequency: 920 kHz
- Branding: The Big KD

Programming
- Format: Urban adult contemporary

Ownership
- Owner: Roscoe Miller; (Autaugaville Radio, Inc.)
- Sister stations: WALQ, WJWZ, WKXK, WKXN, WOZK, WZKD

History
- First air date: 1982
- Former call signs: WYNI (1982–2007); WEZZ (2007–2020)

Technical information
- Licensing authority: FCC
- Facility ID: 40900
- Class: D
- Power: 450 watts (days only)
- Transmitter coordinates: 31°29′40″N 87°21′29″W
- Translator: 106.3 W292HL (Troy)

Links
- Public license information: Public file; LMS

WXKD (920 AM) is a radio station licensed to serve Brantley, Alabama, United States. The station is owned by Roscoe Miller, through licensee Autaugaville Radio, Inc. It airs an urban adult contemporary music format.

== History ==
This station received its original construction permit from the Federal Communications Commission (FCC) on October 28, 1982. The new station was assigned the call letters WYNI by the FCC on December 22, 1982. WYNI received its license to cover from the FCC on March 31, 1983.

In January 1993, Hub City Broadcasting Corp., then-recently acquired by Joe McKissick, reached an agreement to transfer the license for this station to McKissick Enterprises. The deal was approved by the FCC on February 24, 1993, and the transaction was consummated on April 9, 1993.

In August 1999, McKissick Enterprises contracted to sell WYNI to Walter J. Bowen's Southern Media Communications of Monroeville, Inc., for a reported $36,500. The deal was approved by the FCC on October 22, 1999, but the transaction was never consummated and the license stayed with McKissick Enterprises.

In February 2007, McKissick Enterprises reached a new agreement to sell this station to Brantley Broadcast Associates, LLC—again for a reported $36,500 in cash. This deal was approved by the FCC on April 30, 2007, and the transaction was consummated on June 6, 2007. The new owners had the callsign changed to WEZZ on July 5, 2007, as part of a swap between several co-owned radio stations.

On December 31, 2008, a petition for reconsideration of the license transfer authorization was filed by Tri-State Communications, Inc. As of February 18, 2009, that petition was awaiting action by the FCC.

== Silent ==
WEZZ went off the air on March 28, 2008, and ceased broadcasting "as the result of losing its tower site." In April 2008, Brantley Broadcast Associates notified the FCC that they had suspended operations and requested special temporary authority to remain silent. The station's application further states that it was "presently reviewing its options regarding obtaining a new site." In August 2008, the FCC granted the requested special temporary authority which was to expire on February 23, 2009.

== Construction permit ==
In 2004, then-owner Joe McKissick had applied to change the city of license for WYNI from Monroeville, Alabama to Harahan, Louisiana, and shift frequencies to 1190 kHz. In October 2007, the FCC dismissed the request due to the change in ownership of the existing license, which is not permitted by the 2004 frequency auction process.

In December 2008, WEZZ filed a new application with the FCC to move its broadcast transmitter, change its community of license to Brantley, Alabama, shift frequencies to 920 kHz, and decrease daytime power to 450 watts with a critical hours authorization for 450 watts as well. The relocated station would be a daytime-only station with no nighttime signal. This application was accepted for filing on December 18, 2008, and further authorization is pending. The move is part of a three-station shuffle with WAOQ in Brantley moving to Goshen, Alabama, and WGZZ in Dadeville moving to Waverly, Alabama.

On March 13, 2020, the station changed its call sign to WXKD. Effective October 9, 2020, Brantley Broadcast Associates sold WXKD and translator W292HL to Roscoe Miller's Autaugaville Radio, Inc. for $50,000.
