= WZKD =

- Montgomery, Alabama; United States
- Frequency: 950 kHz
- Branding: The Big KD

Programming
- Format: Urban adult contemporary

Ownership
- Owner: Roscoe Miller; (Autaugaville Radio, Inc.)
- Sister stations: WALQ, WJWZ, WKXK, WKXN, WOZK, WXKD

History
- First air date: May 8, 1953
- Former call signs: WRMA (1953–1977); WLSQ (1977–1987); WREZ (1987–1988); WSYA (1988–1995); WNZZ (1995–2016)
- Call sign meaning: WZ Killer Diller (Nickname Of The Station's Owner)

Technical information
- Licensing authority: FCC
- Facility ID: 12321
- Class: D
- Power: 1,000 watts day 45 watts night
- Transmitter coordinates: 32°25′17″N 86°09′52″W
- Translator: 94.1 W231DF (Montgomery)

Links
- Public license information: Public file; LMS
- Webcast: Listen Live
- Website: thebigkd.com

WZKD (950 AM) is a radio station licensed to serve Montgomery, Alabama, United States. The station, originally launched in 1953, is currently owned by Roscoe Miller and the broadcast license is held by Autaugaville Radio, Inc. The WZKD studios are located on the 3rd floor of The Colonial Financial Center in downtown Montgomery, and the transmitter tower is in Montgomery's northeast side.

== Programming ==
Until September 2, 2016, WZKD broadcast an adult standards music format. The beautiful music was only interrupted for news from WSFA-TV and Alabama Radio Network. This station also air Atlanta Braves games.

== History ==
This station began regular broadcast operation on May 8, 1953, licensed as WRMA. Owned by the Southland Broadcasting Company, WRMA began as a 1,000 watt daytime-only station broadcasting on 950 kHz. On December 1, 1957, WRMA was acquired by WRMA Broadcasting Company, Inc. William O. Jones, doing business as W.O. Jones, Inc., purchased WRMA in 1969. On March 24, 1977, the station was acquired by the Brien Broadcasting Corporation. The new owners had the station's callsign changed to WLSQ.

Brien Broadcasting Corporation owner Cleveland J. "Cleve" Brien died in April 1986. The station applied for a new callsign and was assigned WREZ on March 16, 1987.

On June 4, 1987, after clearing probate and other legal hurdles, an application was made to the FCC to transfer control of licensee Brien Broadcasting Corporation to the estate of Cleve J. Brien with Sara M. Brien serving as administratrix. The transfer was approved by the FCC on June 29, 1987. One day later, on June 5, 1987, the Brien Broadcasting Corporation announced an agreement to sell WREZ to Montgomery Broadcasting Limited Partnership. The deal was approved by the FCC on July 17, 1987.

This change would also prove short-lived as on August 4, 1987, the Montgomery Broadcasting Limited Partnership applied to transfer the broadcast license for WREZ to Don McCoy's U.S. Broadcasting Limited Partnership. The transfer was approved by the FCC on August 14, 1987, and the transaction was consummated on October 14, 1987. The new ownership had the FCC change the station's call letters to WSYA on September 14, 1988.

In October 1993, U.S. Broadcasting Limited Partnership contracted to sell this station to Colonial Broadcasting Company, Inc. The deal was approved by the FCC on December 28, 1993, and the transaction was consummated on January 31, 1994. In September 1994, Colonial Company, Inc., agreed to transfer control of station licensee Colonial Broadcasting Company, Inc., to Robert E. Lowder. The deal was approved by the FCC on December 8, 1994, and the transaction was consummated on March 8, 1995.

In March 1995, Robert E. Lowder agreed to transfer control of licensee Colonial Broadcasting Company, Inc., to Republic Corporation. The deal was approved by the FCC on April 4, 1995, but the transaction was never consummated and Lowder retained control of the licensee. In anticipation of the completed sale, the station had switched to the call sign WNZZ on April 17, 1995. In January 1998, Robert E. Lowder reached a new agreement to transfer control of the licensee to Cumulus Media through their Cumulus Holdings, Inc., subsidiary. The deal was approved by the FCC on March 10, 1998.

In a series of internal corporate moves, the license was transferred through several holding companies before winding up with Cumulus Licensing in December 1998. This final deal was approved by the FCC on December 12, 1998, and the transaction was consummated on December 31, 1998.

Cumulus Licensing announced in November 2007 that it would assign the licenses for 19 stations to a trust company, Stratus Radio, to comply with FCC ownership regulations. This trust was to be an independent trustee whose sole mission was to sell off the stations to new owners and, while the sales were pending, to run the stations independently of Cumulus Media. The deal was approved by the FCC on May 15, 2008, but the transfer application was dismissed at the request of Cumulus Licensing LLC.

On June 8, 2016, Joule Broadcasting announced that WNZZ would be sold to Shelby Broadcast Associates for $55,000.

On August 29, 2016, Joule Broadcasting closed on the sale of WNZZ to Shelby Broadcast Associates.

As of this update, Radio Insight is reporting: Shelby Broadcast Associates is spinning its recently acquired Silent 950 WNZZ and 94.1 W231DF Montgomery AL to Roscoe Miller’s Autaugaville Radio for $215,000.

In September 2016, WNZZ went silent.

The sale to Autaugaville Radio was made official at the start of November 2016. Around that time, the new owners reserved the WZKD calls. On December 15, 2016, WNZZ changed their call letters to WZKD.

The station was reported on air in mid-January 2017 airing "The Big Station" urban contemporary format heard on the company's two FM's south of town, WKXK/WKXN. (Taken from Alabama Broadcast Media Page)

Their recently acquired translator W231DF 94.1 FM is now on and filed for a license to cover on 2-28-2017. (Taken from fccdata.org)

In March 2017 WZKD switched from the "Big Station" simulcast to an urban adult contemporary format, branded as "KD 94.1". (Taken from Alabama Broadcast Media Page)
