= WGMP =

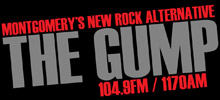
- Montgomery, Alabama; United States
- Frequency: 1170 kHz
- Branding: 104.9 The Gump

Programming
- Format: Alternative rock

Ownership
- Owner: Bluewater Broadcasting Company, LLC
- Sister stations: WACV; WBAM-FM; WJWZ; WQKS-FM

History
- First air date: August 5, 1948
- Former call signs: WJJJ (1948–1954); WCOV (1954–1984); WACV (1984–2012)
- Call sign meaning: "Gump", a take on the nickname for Montgomery

Technical information
- Licensing authority: FCC
- Facility ID: 43633
- Class: D
- Power: 10,000 watts day; 4 watts night
- Transmitter coordinates: 32°27′17.5″N 86°17′25.9″W
- Translator: 104.9 W285AJ (Montgomery)

Links
- Public license information: Public file; LMS
- Webcast: Listen live
- Website: 1049thegump.com

WGMP (1170 kHz, 104.9 The Gump) is an alternative rock formatted radio station that serves the Montgomery metropolitan area, in Alabama, United States, also broadcasting via a broadcast translator on the FM band at 104.9 MHz.

The station's "104.9 The Gump" branding features the frequency of its broadcast translator, W285AJ, rather than its licensed AM frequency. The station is locally owned and operated by Bluewater Broadcasting Company, LLC. The station's studios are located on Wall St. in Midtown Montgomery. The transmitter for WGMP is north of the city, while the translator's transmitter is in midtown near Greenwood Cemetery.

WGMP participates in Montgomery rating survey by Nielsen Audio and is monitored by Mediabase.

== History ==
The station first hit the airwaves on August 5, 1948, as WJJJ, owned by George William "Will" Covington Jr. (1170 AM is the second-oldest frequency in use in the Montgomery market, the oldest being 1440 kHz, which began as WSFA, later became WHHY, and finally WLWI.) It broadcast from studios in the Excelsior Hotel in downtown Montgomery, and was first affiliated with Mutual. In 1948, Covington changed the call letters to WCOV, naming it after himself. It would eventually spawn Montgomery's first television station, which still has the WCOV-TV call letters.

Covington died in 1949, and his family kept the station until selling it to Gay-Bell Corporation in 1964, earning a substantial return on their investment of 25 years earlier. The station changed its call letters to WACV in November 1984, after Gay-Bell sold it. As WACV, it adopted a talk radio format.

In March 2004, Montgomery Broadcast Properties Ltd. (Allan Stroh, CEO) reached an agreement to sell this station to Bluewater Broadcasting LLC. The sale was part of a four-station deal valued at a reported $15.3 million. The deal was approved by the FCC on April 21, 2004, and the transaction was completed on June 21, 2004. At the time of the sale, WACV was broadcasting a news/talk format.

In late March 2009, WACV began simulcasting on WJAM-FM as "News Talk 107.9 FM". On Thursday, April 2, 2009, the FM station changed its calls to WMRK-FM, and WACV became known as "News Talk 107.9, WMRK-FM". The original lineup included news from Bob Jackson, with updates from WAKA. Locally originated programs, such as "Viewpoint", continued on "News Talk 107.9" with Dan Morris and Mark Montiel, and Greg Budell continued "Happy Hour". Nationally syndicated talk programming features Laura Ingraham, Glenn Beck, Rusty Humphries, Jerry Doyle, Roy Masters, and Neal Boortz.

In November 2009, the news/talk programming was re-branded and moved to WMRK-FM as part as of a local marketing agreement with Alexander Communications. WACV changed formats to oldies music and branded itself as "Good Time Oldies WACV". This format was short-lived and on July 30, 2010, WACV changed its format again to alternative rock and re-branded itself as "104.9 The Gump".

On August 13, 2012, the station changed its call sign to WGMP.

This station was reported to be off the air in April 2017; it has been running on a special temporary authority antenna since December 2016 due to lightning damage to their daytime transmitter. As such, if they are on the air at all, they are only operating at 4 watts. On April 12, 2017, the station was granted a Federal Communications Commission construction permit to simplify their transmitter setup significantly, decreasing from 10 kW to 850 watts daytime and from a directional antenna to a non-directional antenna. Nighttime power will increase from 4 watts to 7 watts.

== Programming ==
WGMP plays mostly alternative rock, and plays many modern rock songs. Core artists include: Foo Fighters, The Black Keys, Green Day, Pearl Jam, Weezer, Red Hot Chili Peppers, Blink 182, Cake, Seether, Soundgarden, Jane's Addiction, Linkin Park, Neon Trees, Metallica, Garbage, The Offspring, Bush, and more. WGMP also features news and weather updates from WAKA, and traffic from Montgomery Skywatch Traffic.

There are no disc jockeys, but rather, non-stop music with limited breaks for commercials and station identifications.

== Technical information ==
WGMP broadcasts with a Continental Electronics transmitter at 10,000 watts (daytime) into a two-tower AM directional array. It powers down to 4 watts at night to protect KOTV in Tulsa and WWVA in Wheeling, West Virginia.

=== Translators ===
WGMP programming is also carried on a low-powered FM broadcast translator, mainly to improve the station's nighttime coverage. The AM transmitter must drop to four watts at sunset, rendering it barely listenable even in Montgomery.

Call sign	Frequency	City of license	FID	ERP (W)	Class	FCC info
W285AJ	104.9 FM	Montgomery, Alabama	33504	99	D	LMS
