= WAYE =

Radio station in Birmingham, Alabama

- Birmingham, Alabama; United States
- Frequency: 1220 kHz
- Branding: La Jefa 98.3

Programming
- Format: Spanish variety

Ownership
- Owner: Rivera Radio Media; (Rivera Communications, LLC)
- Sister stations: WQCR

History
- Former call signs: WEDR (1949–1960); WEZB (1960–1963); WAQY (1963–1972); WBUL (1972–1983); WTWG (1983–1984)

Technical information
- Licensing authority: FCC
- Facility ID: 5354
- Class: D
- Power: 1,000 watts day 75 watts night
- Transmitter coordinates: 33°28′37.40″N 86°53′0″W
- Translators: 93.1 W226CT (Leeds); 98.3 W252BE (Tarrant)

Links
- Public license information: Public file; LMS
- Webcast: Listen live
- Website: www.aquimandalajefa.com

WAYE (1220 AM) is a radio station broadcasting a Spanish variety format. Licensed to Birmingham, Alabama, United States, the station serves the Birmingham market. The station is currently owned by Dulce and Maria Rivera, through licensee Rivera Communications, LLC, and features programing from Westwood One.

The station signed on in 1949 using the callsign WEDR. The original president of the company that owned the station was J.L. Doss, who previously had owned WJLD, another Birmingham station. For much of the station's early history, it broadcast only during daytime hours. At least by 1960, the station changed its call letters to WEZB, taking the programming and intellectual property from another station in the Birmingham market.

In 1963 the station was sold and changed its call letters to WAQY and was known on the air as "Wacky 1220". It changed formats, becoming a Top 40 station and putting it in competition against three other stations that were established in the format: WSGN, WVOK, and WYDE. The station gained national notoriety by announcing a boycott of records by The Beatles after John Lennon made his comments that the Fab Four was more popular than Jesus Christ, but it was never a serious competitor to any of the more established Top 40 stations in the market. In 1970 the station dropped Top 40 music for country music, and in 1971 they adopted a format described as "for women only".

In 1972, the station changed its call letters to WBUL, and changed formats to become a soul music station known on the air as 1220 the Bull. This new format put it in competition against AM stations WENN and WJLD, as well as WENN-FM. The station retained this format for the remainder of the 1970s. In 1983 the station changed formats to Big Band music and standards, and changed its call letters to WTWG and was known as Stardust 1220.

The station was assigned the WAYE call letters by the Federal Communications Commission on October 16, 1984, and changed its format to MOR (middle-of-the-road) gospel music as "Way 1220 AM". The format was later changed to black gospel in 1987 upon the station's sale to Willis Broadcasting.

WAYE went silent in July 2010, but resumed broadcasting in early 2012. In August 2013, the station dropped its Black gospel format and became a Regional Mexican music station. In May 2014 the station began broadcasting on FM translator W252BE (98.3 FM), licensed to the Birmingham suburb of Tarrant.

On June 16, 2023, its simulcast on WQCR split from simulcasting with WAYE.
