= WIXI =

- Jasper, Alabama; United States
- Broadcast area: Birmingham, Alabama
- Frequency: 1360 kHz
- Branding: WIXI 1360 AM

Programming
- Format: Rhythmic Oldies; Blues; Gospel; Talk

Ownership
- Owner: Gary Richardson; (Richardson Broadcasting Corporation)
- Sister stations: WJLD

History
- First air date: November 2, 1946
- Former call signs: WWWB (1946–1988); WZPQ (1988–2005)

Technical information
- Licensing authority: FCC
- Facility ID: 60508
- Class: D
- Power: 12,000 watts day 42 watts night
- Transmitter coordinates: 33°49′12″N 87°16′26″W
- Translator: 103.3 W277DM (Jasper)

Links
- Public license information: Public file; LMS
- Website: http://www.wixi1360.com

WIXI (1360 AM) is a radio station licensed to serve the community of Jasper, Alabama, United States. The station, established in 1946 as WWWB, is currently owned and operated by Gary Richardson, through licensee Richardson Broadcasting Corporation.

== Programming ==
WIXI airs a mix of Rhythmic Oldies, Blues, Talk radio and Gospel to the greater Birmingham, Alabama, area.

== History ==
=== As WWWB ===
This station began licensed broadcasting with 250 watts of power on 1240 kHz on November 2, 1946, as WWWB. Under the ownership of Bankhead Broadcasting Company, Inc., WWWB was the first radio station licensed to Jasper, Alabama. The station's call letters were chosen to match the initials of Bankhead Broadcasting Company owner W.W. Bankhead.

In 1955, the station got a construction permit from the FCC that allowed then to move to the current 1360 kHz broadcast frequency and increase signal power to 1,000 watts.

In 1975, the station moved its studios to a house at 409 Ninth Avenue in Jasper that had been owned by auto dealer George Vines during the 1950s. According to station personnel, Vines' ghost haunted the station for most of the three decades it occupied the house.

In March 1986, Tri-W Broadcasting, Inc., reached an agreement to sell WWWB, to SIS Sound, Inc. The deal was approved by the Federal Communications Commission on June 4, 1986, and the transaction was consummated on October 28, 1986.

=== As WZPQ ===
The station, previously known as WWWB, was assigned new call letters WZPQ by the FCC on October 10, 1988.

On November 15, 1997, William A. Grant Jr., the owner of WZPQ license holder SIS Sound, Inc., died. In March 1998, control of the company passed involuntarily to his sons William A. Grant III and Walter B. Grant. The transfer of control was approved by the FCC on May 21, 1998, and the transaction was consummated on the same day.

In July 1999, SIS Sound, Inc., reached an agreement to sell WZPQ to James T. Lee for a reported sale price of $100,000. The deal was approved by the FCC on August 24, 1999, and the transaction was consummated on September 1, 1999.

=== As WIXI ===
The station was assigned the current WIXI call letters by the FCC on June 6, 2005.

In October 2006, James T. Lee reached an agreement to sell WIXI to Walker Broadcasting Inc. The deal was approved by the FCC on November 14, 2006, and the transaction was consummated on December 1, 2006.

In June 2008, Walker Broadcasting Inc. reached an agreement to transfer WIXI back to James T. Lee in exchange for the forgiveness of an unspecified debt. The deal was approved by the FCC on July 28, 2008, and the transaction was consummated on September 3, 2008.

On September 9, 2008, James T. Lee reached an agreement to sell WIXI to Snavely Broadcasting Company LLC (David Snavely, managing member) for a reported $199,500. The deal was approved by the FCC on October 27, 2008, and consummation of the transaction occurred December 9, 2008.

=== Power increase ===
In January 2010, acting on engineering data filed with the FCC, WIXI increased its daytime power to 12,000 watts. It began using the slogan, "Walker County's Most Powerful Radio Station." WIXI carried locally produced shows, "The People's Viewpoint," a politically oriented talk show, and "Talking Walker County," a Jasper-area current and civic variety show. These programs were produced by Bishop Media. The station acquired broadcast rights for the Auburn Tigers in 2010, and was the flagship station for the local Cordova Blue Devils.

The station was sold from Snavely Broadcasting to Rivera Broadcasting in November 2012, and dropped its longtime Classic Country format for its current programming in January 2013. The station was again sold, this time to Gary Richardson's Richardson Broadcasting Corporation, in exchange for WAYE; Rivera Broadcasting also included $275,000 in the transaction, which was consummated on April 11, 2014. After the sale was approved, the format changed from Regional Mexican to a mix of Rhythmic Oldies, Blues, Talk and Gospel.
