= WSMX-FM =

- Goshen, Alabama; United States
- Broadcast area: Troy, Alabama
- Frequency: 100.3 MHz
- Branding: Super Mix 100.3

Programming
- Format: Classic Country/Classic Hits

Ownership
- Owner: Christopher Johnson and Robert Williams; (J&W Communications LLC)

History
- First air date: 1999 (as WAOQ)
- Former call signs: WAOQ (1995–2016)
- Call sign meaning: W Super Mix

Technical information
- Licensing authority: FCC
- Facility ID: 825
- Class: A
- ERP: 6,000 watts
- HAAT: 86 meters
- Transmitter coordinates: 31°48′37″N 86°01′22″W

Links
- Public license information: Public file; LMS
- Website: supermix1003.com

WSMX-FM (100.3 FM) is a radio station licensed to serve Goshen, Alabama, United States. The station, which first began regular broadcasting in 1999, is owned by Christopher Johnson and Robert Williams, through licensee J&W Communications LLC.

== Programming ==
WSMX-FM broadcasts a hybrid classic country/classic hits music format. In addition to its usual music programming, WSMX-FM features news at the top of the hour, local community announcements on the half-hour, plus weather at the top and bottom of every hour. Notable programming includes a two-hour "Swap Shop" each weekday morning, two hours of Southern Gospel music on Family Gospel Time each weekday evening, plus a Sunday morning church service from First United Methodist of Luverne.

== History ==
This station received its original construction permit from the Federal Communications Commission on July 10, 1995. The new station was assigned the call letters WAOQ by the FCC on December 1, 1995. After several extensions, WAOQ received its license to cover from the FCC on March 21, 2000.

The station changed its call sign from WAOQ to WSMX-FM on July 7, 2016.

On August 26, 2016, this station did a tweak with their format. (Taken from their Facebook Page) A new sound is coming from 100.3FM . We are now Supermix 100.3FM WSMX. We play "All the hits you grew up with". A mix of your favorite country oldies and your favorite pop and rock & roll oldies.

== Construction permit ==
In December 2008, the station applied for a construction permit that would allow it to change its community of license from Brantley, Alabama to tiny Goshen, Alabama. The application was contingent upon a simultaneous application to allow WEZZ to move from Monroeville, Alabama, to Brantley and take over the WAOQ broadcast tower. In mid September 2016, this station signed on from their new facility in Goshen, Alabama, for which the license to operate was issued on September 19, 2016. (Taken from Alabama Broadcast Media Page)
