= Orrville, Alabama =

- Town
- Location of Orrville in Dallas County, Alabama.
- Coordinates: 32°18′24″N 87°14′55″W
- Country: United States
- State: Alabama
- County: Dallas

Area
  - Total: 1.03 sq mi (2.68 km^{2})
  - Land: 1.03 sq mi (2.68 km^{2})
  - Water: 0 sq mi (0.00 km^{2})
- Elevation: 194 ft (59 m)

Population (2020)
  - Total: 150
  - Density: 144.7/sq mi (55.87/km^{2})
- Time zone: UTC-6 (Central (CST))
  - Summer (DST): UTC-5 (CDT)
- ZIP code: 36767
- Area code: 334
- FIPS code: 01-57240
- GNIS feature ID: 2407056
- Website: orrville-al.com

Orrville is a town in Dallas County, Alabama, United States. At the 2020 census, the population was 150. According to the 1910 U.S. census, Orrville incorporated in 1908, though it was listed as an incorporated community prior to that.

== Geography ==
Orrville is located in western Dallas County. Alabama State Route 22 passes through the town, leading northeast 15 miles (24 km) to Selma, the county seat, and west 8 miles (13 km) to Safford.

According to the U.S. Census Bureau, Orrville has a total area of 1.0 square mile (2.7 km^{2}), all land.

== Demographics ==
Historical population
Census	Pop.	Note	%±
1880	270		—
1890	321		18.9%
1910	255		—
1920	341		33.7%
1930	394		15.5%
1940	416		5.6%
1950	416		0.0%
1960	422		1.4%
1970	362		−14.2%
1980	349		−3.6%
1990	234		−33.0%
2000	230		−1.7%
2010	204		−11.3%
2020	150		−26.5%
U.S. Decennial Census; 2013 Estimate

=== Racial and ethnic composition ===
Orrville town, Alabama – Racial and ethnic composition Note: the US Census treats Hispanic/Latino as an ethnic category. This table excludes Latinos from the racial categories and assigns them to a separate category. Hispanics/Latinos may be of any race.
Race / Ethnicity (NH = Non-Hispanic)	Pop 2000	Pop 2010	Pop 2020	% 2000	% 2010	% 2020
White alone (NH)	118	77	60	51.30%	37.75%	40.00%
Black or African American alone (NH)	110	127	76	47.83%	62.25%	50.67%
Native American or Alaska Native alone (NH)	0	0	2	0.00%	0.00%	1.33%
Asian alone (NH)	0	0	1	0.00%	0.00%	0.67%
Native Hawaiian or Pacific Islander alone (NH)	0	0	0	0.00%	0.00%	0.00%
Other race alone (NH)	0	0	0	0.00%	0.00%	0.00%
Mixed race or Multiracial (NH)	1	0	10	0.43%	0.00%	6.67%
Hispanic or Latino (any race)	1	0	1	0.43%	0.00%	0.67%
Total	230	204	150	100.00%	100.00%	100.00%

=== 2000 census ===
As of the census of 2000, there were 230 people, 105 households, and 59 families residing in the town. The population density was 222.5 inhabitants per square mile (85.9/km^{2}). There were 118 housing units at an average density of 114.2 per square mile (44.1/km^{2}). The racial makeup of the town was 51.30% White, 48.26% Black or African American, and 0.43% from two or more races. 0.43% of the population were Hispanic or Latino of any race.

There were 105 households, out of which 20.0% had children under the age of 18 living with them, 42.9% were married couples living together, 10.5% had a female householder with no husband present, and 42.9% were non-families. 41.9% of all households were made up of individuals, and 19.0% had someone living alone who was 65 years of age or older. The average household size was 2.19 and the average family size was 3.03.

In the town, the population was spread out, with 19.6% under the age of 18, 7.0% from 18 to 24, 26.1% from 25 to 44, 26.1% from 45 to 64, and 21.3% who were 65 years of age or older. The median age was 43 years. For every 100 females, there were 88.5 males. For every 100 females age 18 and over, there were 85.0 males.

The median income for a household in the town was $28,571, and the median income for a family was $31,719. Males had a median income of $29,583 versus $30,000 for females. The per capita income for the town was $15,418. About 9.9% of families and 15.7% of the population were below the poverty line, including none of those under the age of 18 and 22.2% of those 65 or over.

== Government ==
Orrville is an incorporated town, governed by a mayor/town council structure. Current mayor Louvenia Lumpkin was first elected in 2012, defeating incumbent mayor Gene McHugh; she was re-elected in 2016. Herman Majors is Orrville's Town Council President and its longest-serving town councilmember, first appointed in 1970 and re-elected every term since then. Other councilmembers elected or re-elected in 2016 include Jewell Williamson, William Lumpkin (husband of Mayor Louvenia Lumpkin), Jerry Phillips and Jim Brunson.

== Businesses ==
At the height of the expansion of the recreational boating industry, Orrville was home to Baker-Jewell Inc., a small manufacturing company which produced small fiberglass boats for the recreational market. They featured iconic styling of the late 1950s era, including automotive-type tailfins and seating.

Today a small factory in Orrville manufactures portable buildings.

Orrville Farmers Market opened in 2016 in the heart of town and sells locally grown farm-fresh produce, artisan foods, agricultural-based products and country-themed gifts. The market also serves hot breakfast and lunch six days a week, Monday through Saturday. Orrville Farmers Market gives local farmers the opportunity to develop a personal relationship with their customers and to cultivate consumer loyalty to the farmer who grows the produce and produces farm-fresh products.

== Notable person ==
- Jimmy "Orion" Ellis, singer

== Gallery ==
Below are photographs taken of structures in Orrville as part of the Historic American Buildings Survey:

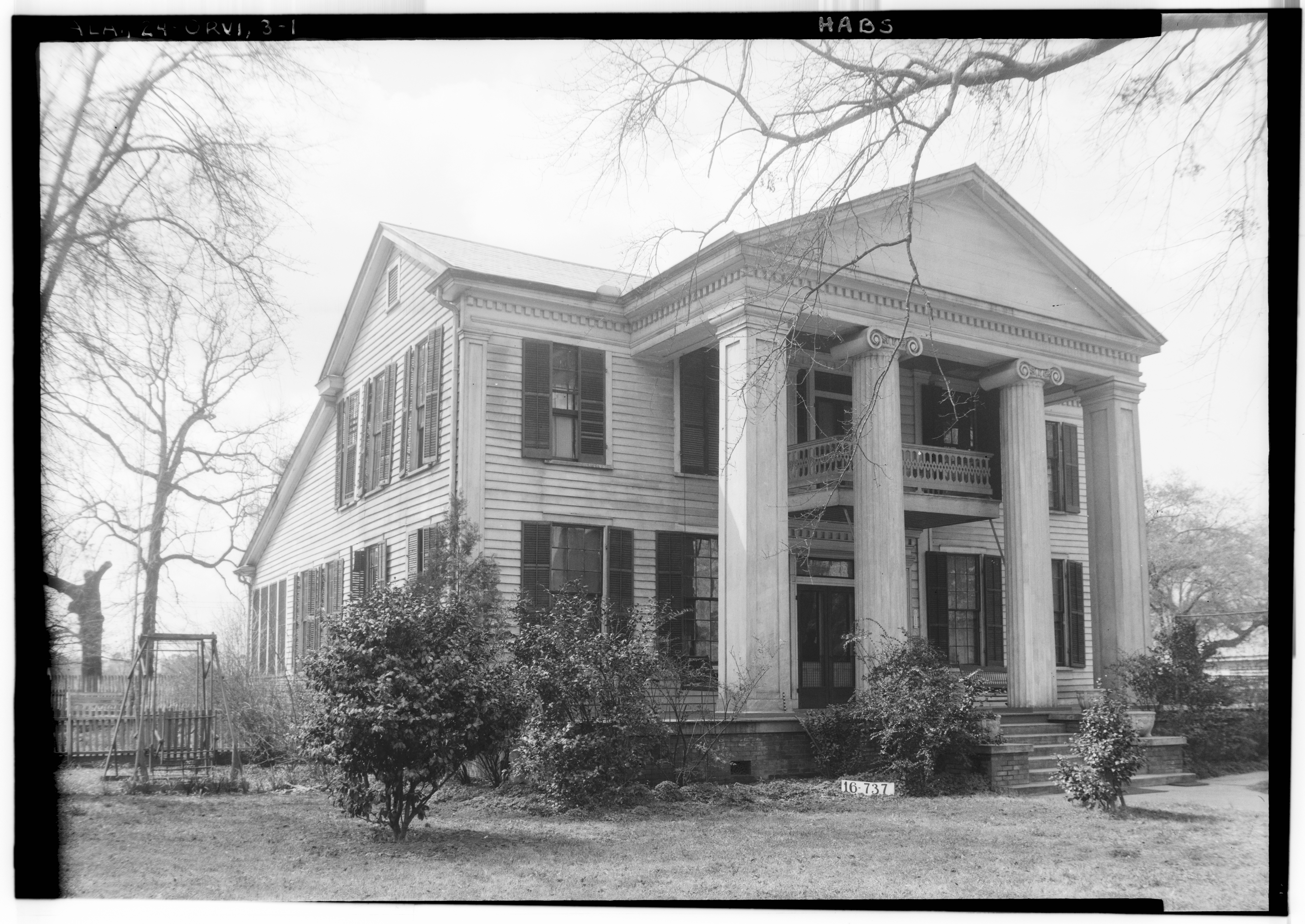
Ben Ellis Dunaway House

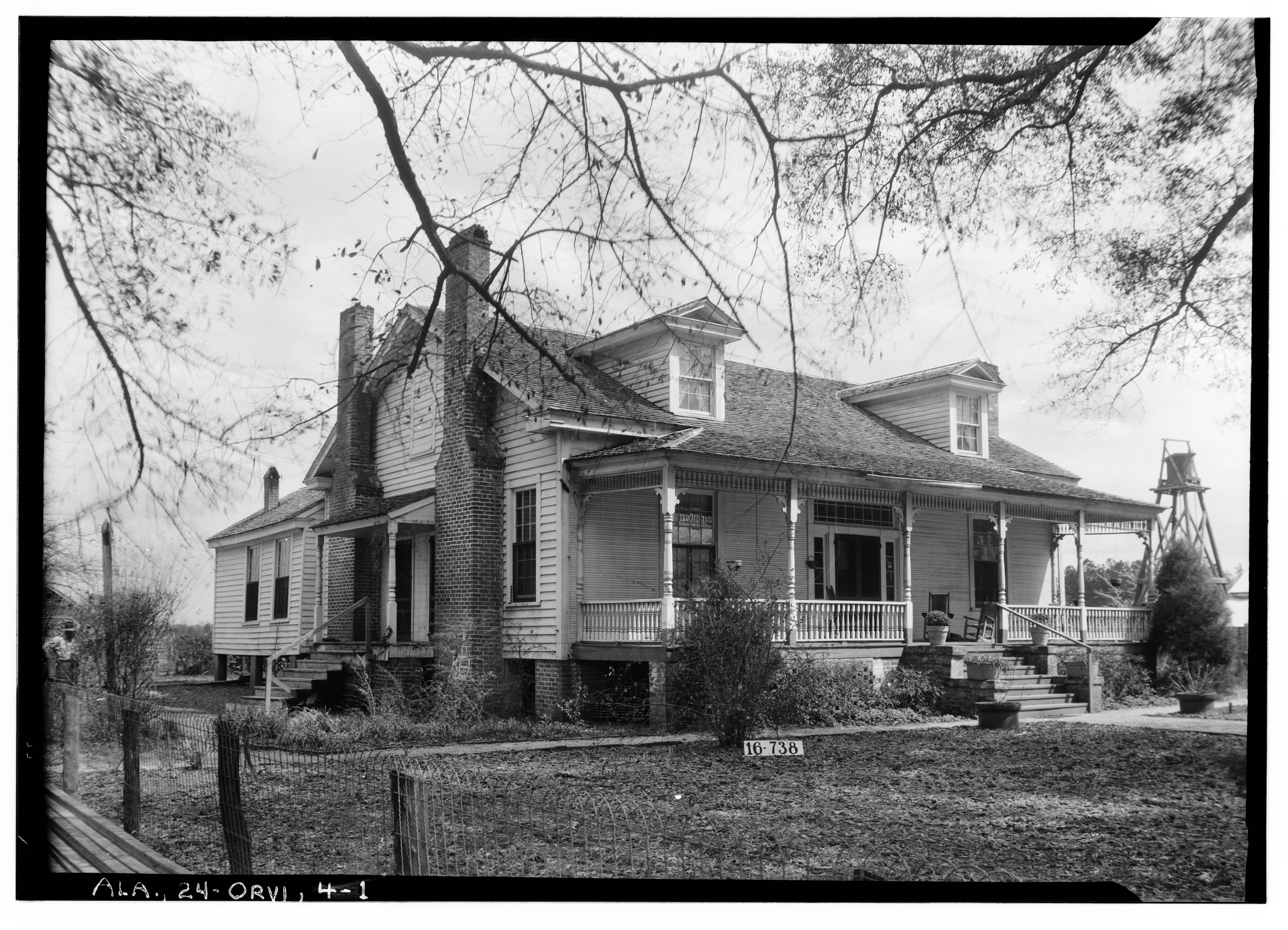
Craig-Wilson House

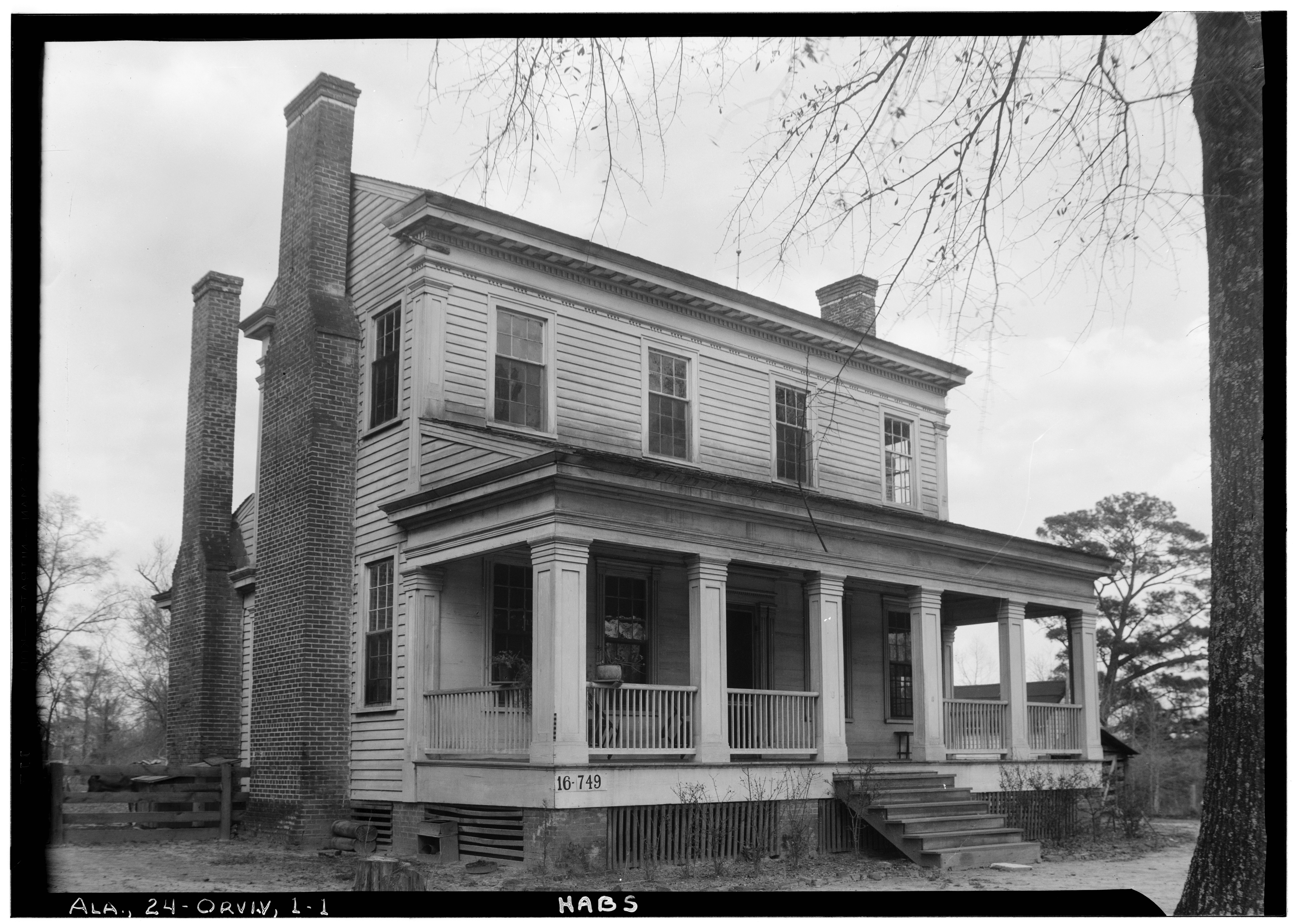
Bland House

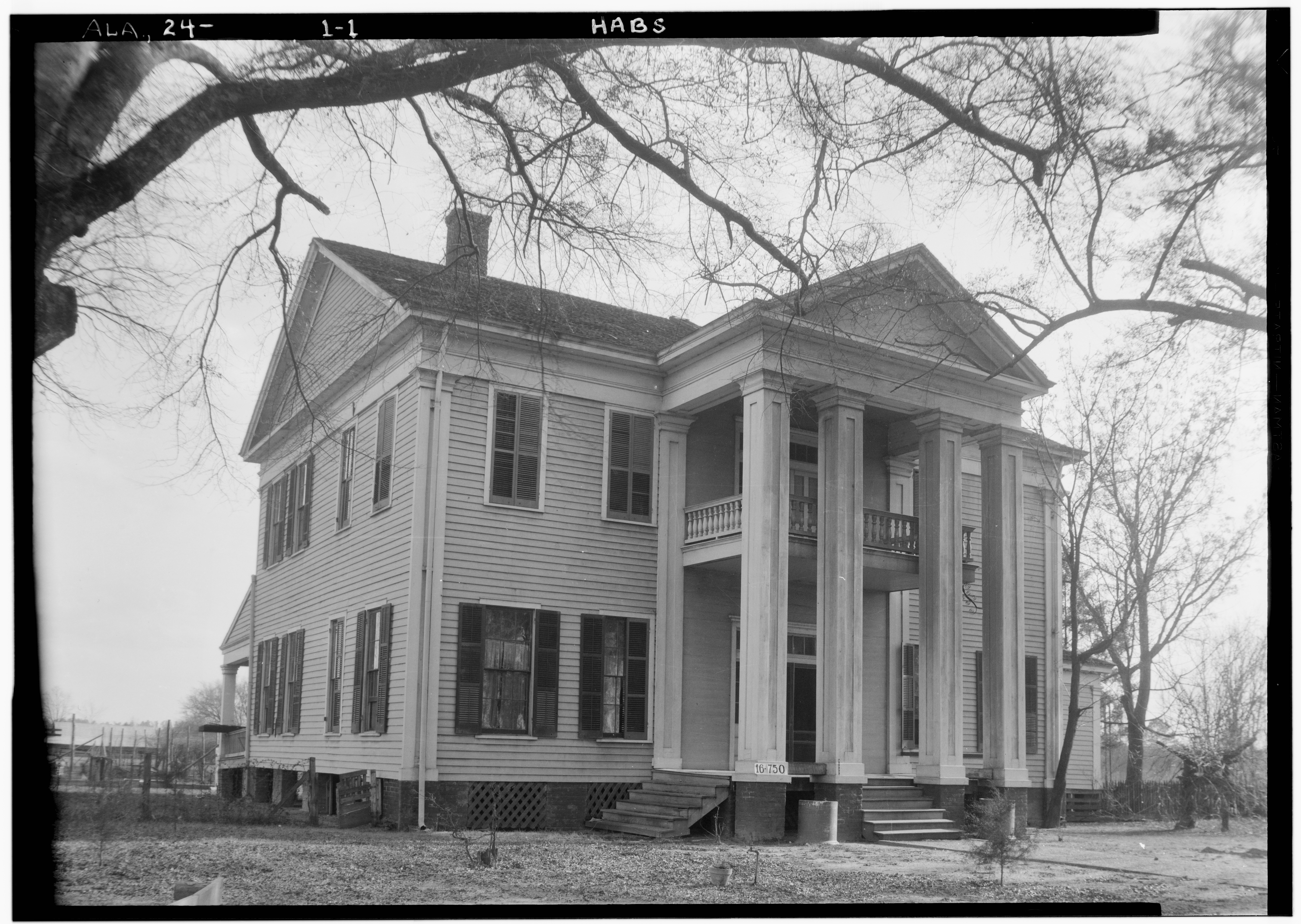
Cochran House

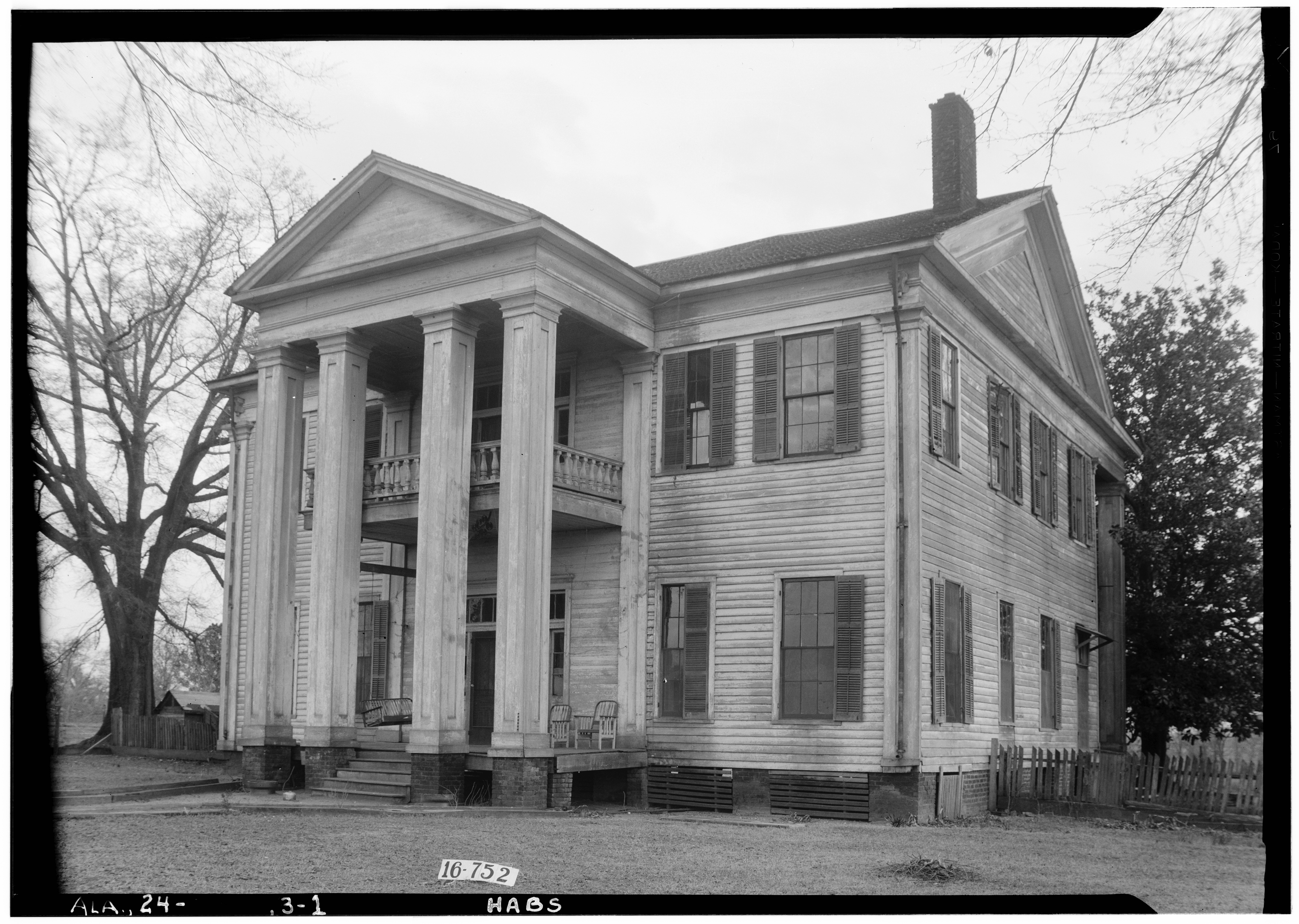
Lewis McMillan House

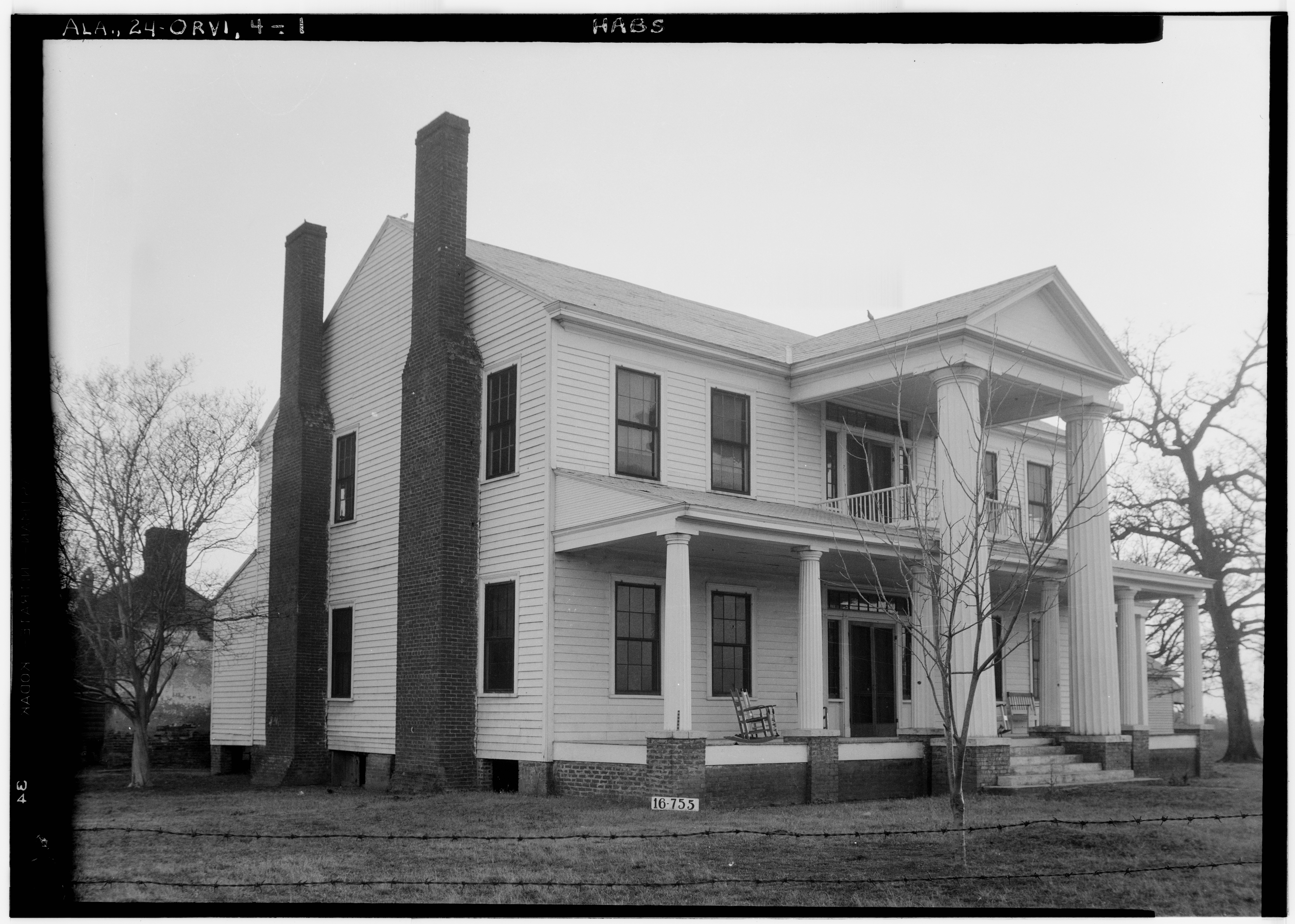
Kelley-Bland-Ward House

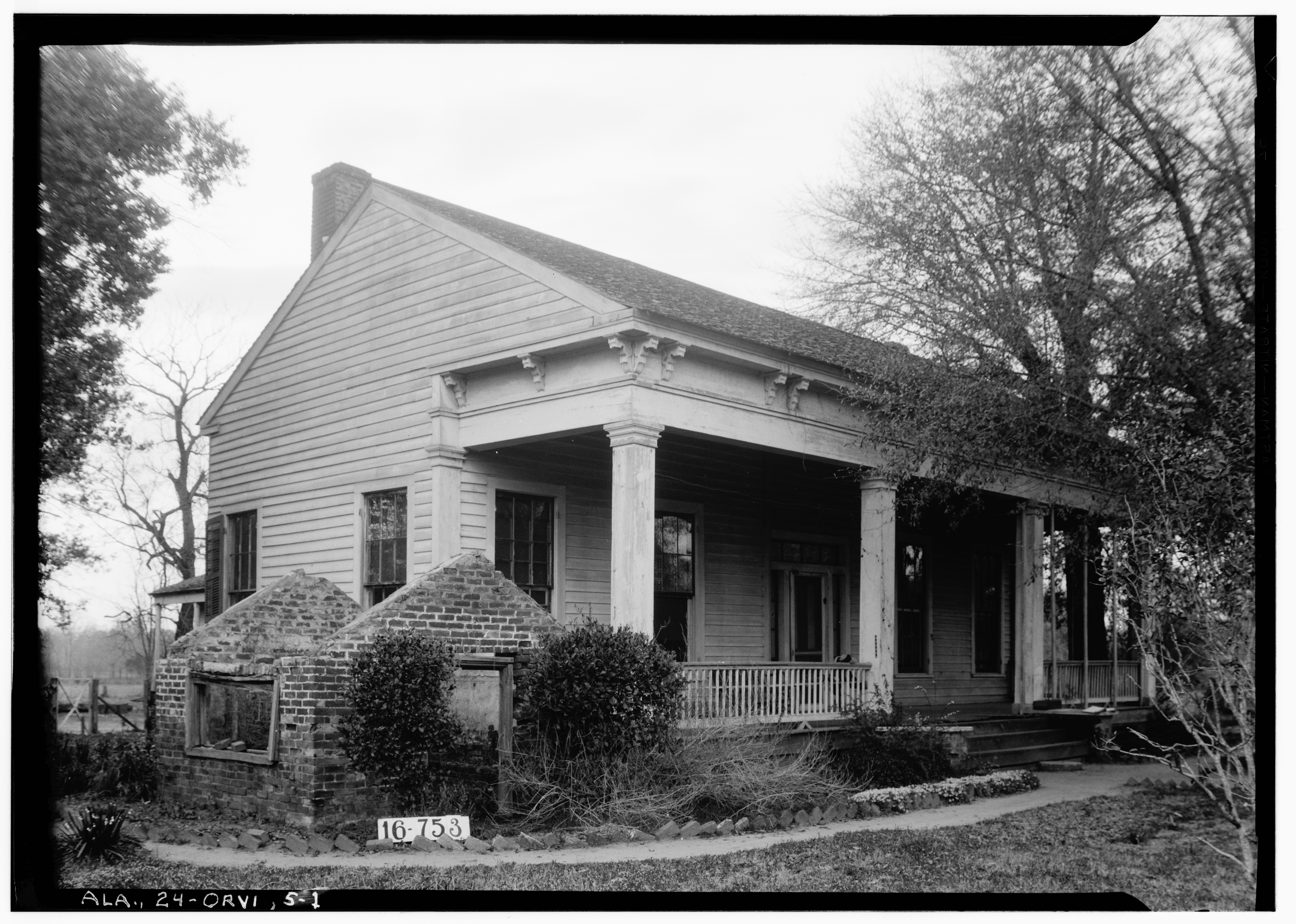
House on Molette property

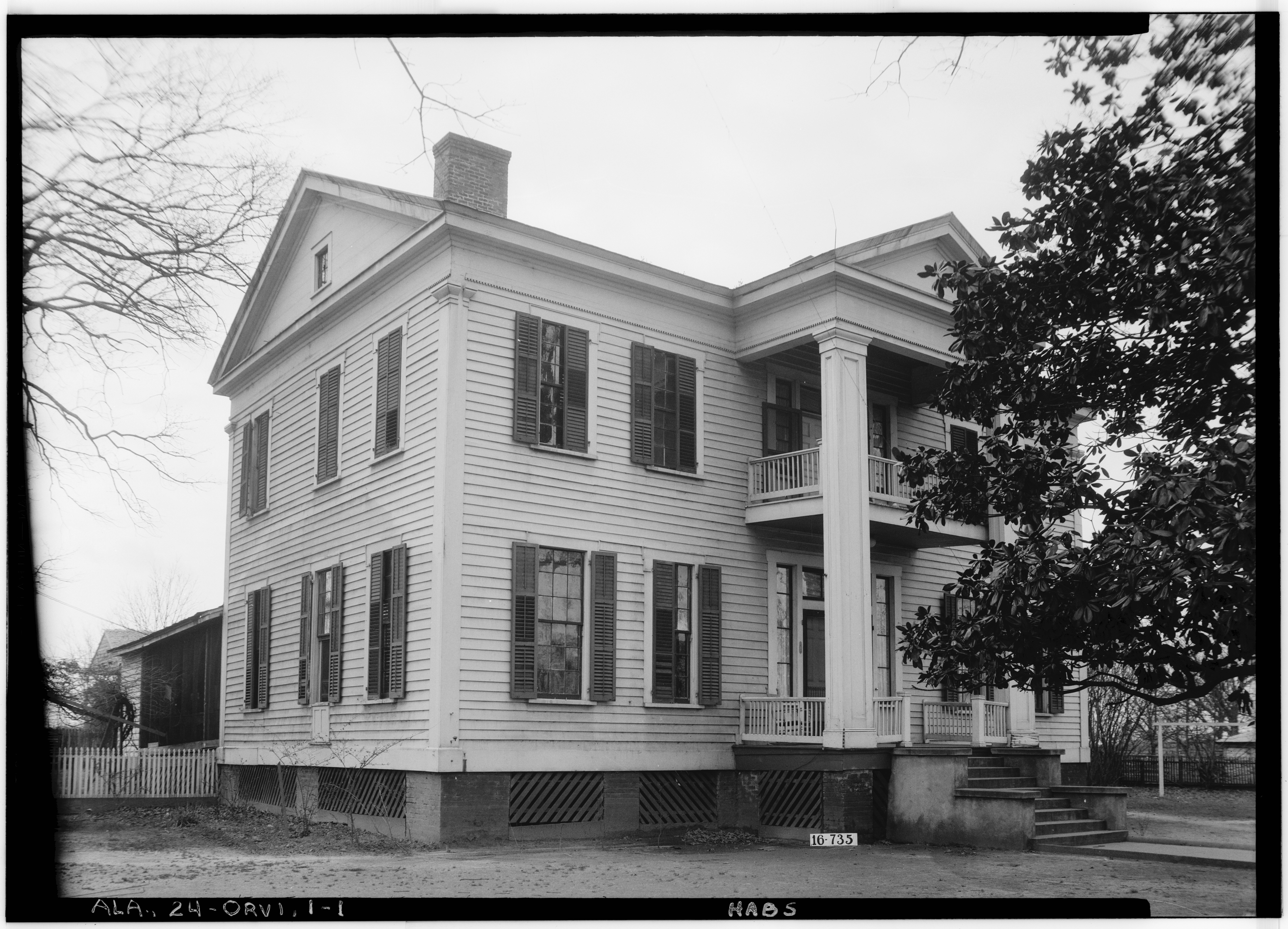
Smith-Sutton House

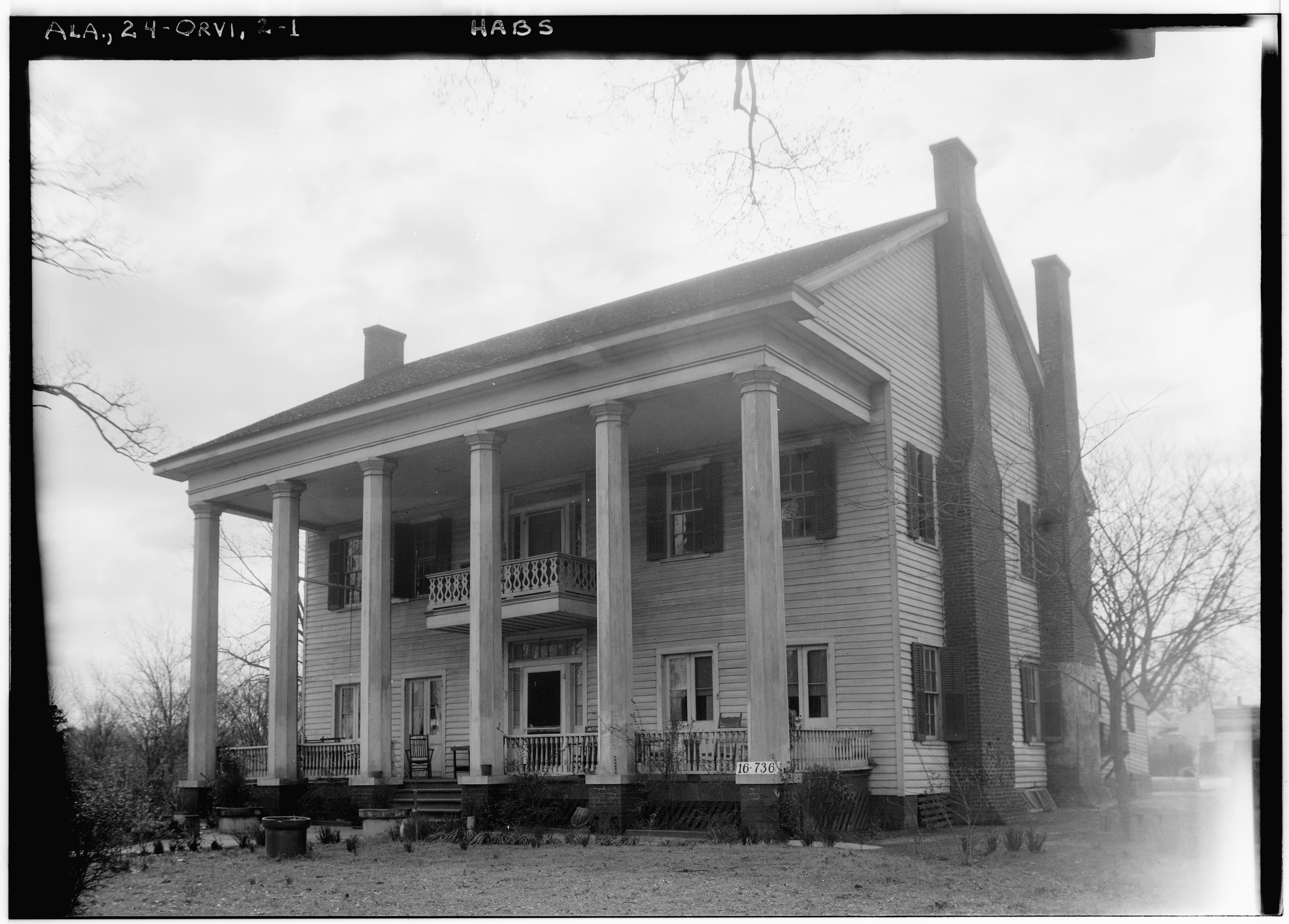
Mill-Albritton House
