= WINL =

- Linden, Alabama; United States
- Broadcast area: Demopolis, Alabama
- Frequency: 98.5 MHz
- Branding: Dixie Country

Programming
- Format: Country (WDXX simulcast)
- Affiliations: Cumulus Media Networks

Ownership
- Owner: Westburg Broadcasting Alabama, LLC
- Sister stations: WDXX, WZNJ

History
- Former call signs: WDAL (1986–1991)
- Former frequencies: 107.1 MHz (1986–1990)

Technical information
- Licensing authority: FCC
- Facility ID: 54538
- Class: C1
- ERP: 100,000 watts
- HAAT: 249 meters (817 ft)
- Transmitter coordinates: 32°07′34″N 87°44′02″W

Links
- Public license information: Public file; LMS
- Website: dixiecountry.net

WINL (98.5 FM, "Dixie Country") is an American radio station licensed to serve the community of Linden, Alabama. The station's broadcast license is held by Westburg Broadcasting Alabama, LLC.

WINL broadcasts a country music format to the greater Demopolis, Alabama, area. The format includes select programming from Cumulus Media Networks.

== History ==
This station received its original construction permit for a new station broadcasting with 3,000 watts of effective radiated power at 107.1 MHz from the Federal Communications Commission on August 6, 1986. The new station was assigned the call letters WDAL by the FCC on September 15, 1986. In November 1986, L. Lynn Henley reached an agreement to transfer this construction permit to Marengo County Broadcasting, Inc. The deal was approved by the FCC on April 7, 1987, and the transaction was consummated on April 29, 1987. WDAL received its license to cover from the FCC on August 17, 1988.

On September 13, 1989, the FCC granted the station a new construction permit to relocate to 98.5 MHz, increase power to 50,000 watts, and upgrade to class C2.

In August 1990, Marengo County Broadcasting, Inc., reached an agreement to sell this station to Radio Communicators, Inc. The deal was approved by the FCC on October 18, 1990, and the transaction was consummated on December 31, 1990.

On February 14, 1991, the FCC granted the station a construction permit allowing them to upgrade to class C1, increase power to 100,000 watts, and relocate their transmitter just over 20 kilometers southeast of their city of license, Linden, Alabama. The station was assigned current call letters WINL by the FCC on March 25, 1991.

In November 2000, Radio Communicators, Inc., reached an agreement to sell this station to West Alabama Communications, Inc. The deal was approved by the FCC on February 12, 2001, and the transaction was consummated on April 26, 2001.

In December 2005, West Alabama Communications, Inc., merged with Ross Communications, Inc., and as part of that merger West Alabama Communications agreed to transfer control of this station to the newly merged company, West Alabama Radio, Inc. The deal was approved by the FCC on January 19, 1997, and the transaction was consummated on March 23, 2007.

The station was acquired in 2011 by Westburg Broadcasting Alabama, LLC.

On October 7, 2013 WINL rebranded as "Dixie Country", simulcasting WDXX 100.1 FM Selma, Alabama.
