= WJWZ =

- Wetumpka, Alabama; United States
- Broadcast area: Montgomery, Alabama
- Frequency: 97.9 MHz
- RDS: @TopdogLaw Accidents Attorneys topdoglaw.com 97.9 jamz
- Branding: 97.9 Jamz

Programming
- Format: Urban Contemporary

Ownership
- Owner: Roscoe Miller; (Autaugaville Radio, Inc)
- Sister stations: WALQ, WKXK, WKXN, WXKD, WZKD

History
- First air date: 1998
- Former call signs: WICE (1997–1998)
- Call sign meaning: JamZ

Technical information
- Licensing authority: FCC
- Facility ID: 70356
- Class: A
- ERP: 3,700 watts
- HAAT: 92.3 meters (302 feet)
- Transmitter coordinates: 32°27′08″N 86°12′35″W

Links
- Public license information: Public file; LMS
- Webcast: Listen Live
- Website: 979jamz.com

WJWZ, also known as 97.9 Jamz, is an urban contemporary formatted radio station that serves the Montgomery Metropolitan Area, broadcasting on the FM band at a frequency of 97.9 MHz and licensed to Wetumpka, Alabama. The station is locally owned and operated by Autaugaville Radio, Inc , LLC. The station's transmitter is located in Montgomery. The station's studios are located on Wall St. in Midtown Montgomery.

Local on-air personalities include Michelle C, Doughboy, and Frank White. WJWZ also participates in Montgomery rating survey by Arbitron (Market #150) and is monitored by Mediabase. It is the home of Tom Joyner in the mornings as of October 2013, after crosstown urban WWMG dropped him for Steve Harvey. Joyner replaces Russ Parr after five years, whom in turn replaced Doug Banks on the station.

== History ==
Vision Communications, Ltd. received the original construction permit to build a new 3,700 watt FM station at 97.9 MHz from the Federal Communications Commission on May 28, 1996. This construction permit was transferred from Vision Communications, Ltd. to Vision Communications, Ltd. II in April 1997. The new station was assigned the call letters WICE by the FCC on July 7, 1997.

In April 1998, control of permit holder Vision Communications, Ltd. II was transferred from Philip L. Williams to Montgomery Broadcast Properties, Ltd. On April 4, 1998, the station applied to the FCC for program test authority which was finally granted on July 24, 1998. The station's call letters were changed to the current WJWZ on April 24, 1998. The transfer to Montgomery Broadcast Properties, Ltd., was approved by the FCC on June 19, 1998.

In August 1998, Vision Communications, Ltd. II applied to assign the permit outright to Montgomery Broadcast Properties, Ltd. The transfer was approved by the FCC on September 16, 1998 and the transaction was consummated on September 22, 1998.

WJWZ received its license to cover from the FCC on April 20, 1999.

In March 2004, Montgomery Broadcast Properties Ltd. (Allan Stroh, CEO) reached an agreement to sell this station to Bluewater Broadcasting LLC. The sale was part of a multi-company four-station deal valued at a reported $15.3 million. The deal was approved by the FCC on April 21, 2004, and the transaction was consummated on June 21, 2004. At the time of the sale, WJWZ was broadcasting a Hip hop format.

== Technical information ==
WJWZ broadcasts with a 5 kW Harris transmitter into a 2-Bay Shively Labs High-Power 6810 non-directional antenna. While the station is non-directional, it must protect to the northeast per FCC rules section 73.215 (contour protection).
