= WVNN =

WVNN may refer to:

- WVNN (AM), a radio station (770 AM) licensed to Athens, Alabama, United States
- WVNN-FM, a radio station (92.5 FM) licensed to Trinity, Alabama, United States
