= WAFN =

WAFN may refer to:

- WAFN (AM), a radio station (1310 AM) licensed to Priceville, Alabama, United States
- WAFN-FM, a radio station (92.7 FM) licensed to Arab, Alabama, United States
