= WYAM =

WYAM or Wyam may refer to:

- WYAM (AM), a radio station (890 AM) licensed to Hartselle, Alabama, United States
- WYAM-LD, a low-power television station (channel 28, virtual 51) licensed to Priceville, Alabama, United States
- Wyam, a sub tribe of the Tenino people in Oregon, U.S.
- a Chinookan and Sahaptian name for Celilo Falls
  - Celilo Falls, a tribal fishing area on the border between the U.S. states of Oregon and Washington
  - Celilo Village, Oregon, an unincorporated Native American community in Wasco County, Oregon, United States
