= WBHP (1230 AM) =

Huntsville, Alabama; United States
- Broadcast area: Madison County, Alabama
- Frequency: 1230 kHz

Ownership
- Owner: iHeartMedia, Inc.; (iHM Licenses, LLC)
- Sister stations: WDRM; WHOS; WQRV; WTAK-FM

History
- First air date: May 23, 1937
- Last air date: October 3, 2024
- Former frequencies: 1200 kHz (1937–1941)
- Call sign meaning: Wilton "Buster" H. Pollard (former owner)

Technical information
- Licensing authority: FCC
- Facility ID: 44025
- Class: C
- Power: 1,000 watts (unlimited)
- Transmitter coordinates: 34°43′9.3″N 86°35′42″W
- Translator: 102.5 W273CX (Huntsville)
- Repeater: 102.1 WDRM-HD2 (Decatur)

Links
- Public license information: Public file; LMS

WBHP (1230 AM) was a commercial radio station licensed to Huntsville, Alabama, United States, and served Madison County. Last owned by iHeartMedia, it aired a talk format as part of a simulcast with WHOS (800 AM) in nearby Decatur, FM translator W273CX at 102.5 MHz and on the second HD Radio channel of WDRM (102.1 FM). Its studios were located in Madison, Alabama, and its AM transmitter was located on Peoples Road near Interstate 565 in Madison, Alabama southwest of downtown Huntsville.

WBHP went on the air in 1937. It was the indirect successor to a previous station, WBHS, which operated from 1932 to 1935. WBHP was a country music station until 1997, when it began an all-news format. The station went off the air in 2024 after its tower collapsed; it did not return, and surrendered its license in 2025.

== History ==
The first construction permit for a station on 1200 kHz in Huntsville was issued in May 1931. It signed on the air on April 22, 1932, as WBHS, the first radio station in Huntsville. It was a service of The Hutchens Company, a hardware firm; the WBHS call sign stood "World's Best Hardware Store". The studios were in the Russel Erskine Hotel in downtown Huntsville. WBHS later moved to a building on Governor’s Drive.

During the Great Depression, WBHS ran into financial problems and went off the air in 1935. The Federal Communications Commission (FCC) reassigned the frequency and a new station went on the air on May 23, 1937, with the call letters WBHP. This call sign stemmed from longtime previous owner Wilton "Buster" Harvey Pollard. In 1941, due to the North American Regional Broadcasting Agreement, WBHP moved from 1200 kHz to 1230 kHz. WBHP went through several owners until its eventual acquisition by iHeartMedia, Inc. (formerly Clear Channel Communications).

From its early days until the November 1997 switch to an all-news format, WBHP broadcast country music. In the 1960s the country music station put its format aside for one hour each Sunday afternoon to air classical music. The program was called "The German Hour" and catered to Wernher von Braun’s German rocket scientists and their families. More than 1500 German scientists, engineers and technicians were brought to Huntsville to work on developing rockets as part of Operation Paperclip.

WBHP and WHOS were the flagship stations for the 1999-2000 final season of the Huntsville Channel Cats and for the short-lived Huntsville Tornado for the 2000-2001 hockey season. Both teams played their home games at the Von Braun Center and competed in the Central Hockey League. In 2018, WBHP launched FM translator W273CX (102.5 FM) to simulcast the station. In addition to its regularly scheduled talk programming, the station was an affiliate of the Auburn Tigers football radio network. It also carried Auburn Tigers men's basketball.

On October 3, 2024, a delivery truck clipped a guy wire and toppled the WBHP transmission tower on Governors Drive, taking the station off the air. It never returned; iHeartMedia returned the WBHP license to the FCC in February 2025, and it was cancelled on February 25, 2025. WBHP's programming would continue on WHOS, WDRM-HD2, and W273CX; on March 4, 2025, iHeartMedia filed to change WHOS's call sign to WBHP effective March 31.

== Awards and honors ==
As a country music-formatted station, WBHP on-air personality Dana Webb was nominated for and won a Country Music Association Award as "Small Market Broadcast Personality of the Year" in 1986.
