= WUMP =

- Madison, Alabama; United States
- Broadcast area: Huntsville metropolitan area
- Frequency: 730 kHz
- Branding: Jox Huntsville

Programming
- Format: Sports
- Affiliations: Westwood One Sports

Ownership
- Owner: Cumulus Media; (Cumulus Licensing LLC)
- Sister stations: WHRP, WVNN, WVNN-FM, WZYP

History
- First air date: 1983
- Former call signs: WABT (1982–1985); WDKT (1985–1991); WKMW (1991–1993); WBBI (1993–1995)
- Former frequencies: 1360 kHz (1983–1985)
- Call sign meaning: Umpire

Technical information
- Licensing authority: FCC
- Facility ID: 39590
- Class: D
- Power: 1,000 watts (day); 129 watts (night)
- Transmitter coordinates: 34°41′46″N 86°44′19″W
- Translator: 103.9 W280BA (Madison)

Links
- Public license information: Public file; LMS
- Webcast: Listen live Listen live via iHeart
- Website: umpsports.com

WUMP (730 AM, "Jox Huntsville") is a commercial radio station licensed to Madison, Alabama, United States, and serving the Huntsville metropolitan area. It is owned by Cumulus Media with studios on U.S. Route 72 in Athens and transmitter sited on Hughes Road in Madison. Programming is also heard on low-power FM translator W280BA at 103.9 MHz.

== History ==
=== Launch at 1360 AM ===
This station received its original construction permit for a 500-watt station broadcasting on 1360 kHz from the Federal Communications Commission on September 13, 1982. The new station was assigned the call letters WABT by the FCC. WABT received its license to cover from the FCC on June 19, 1983. The station aired a country music format to start with.

In June 1985, The Great American Broadcasting Corporation reached an agreement to sell WABT to Excelsior Broadcasting Corporation. The deal was approved by the FCC on July 19, 1985, and the transaction was consummated on January 22, 1986.

=== Move to 730 AM ===
The station had applied to the FCC in September 1983 to change frequencies from 1360 kHz to 730 kHz and increase power to 1,000 watts. In July 1985, after WJMW moved from 730 kHz to 770 kHz, the FCC issued a construction permit for the changes. The new owners had the FCC change the station's callsign to WDKT on December 26, 1985.

With new ownership, new call letters, a new frequency, and increased power in place, the station changed to an urban contemporary format branded as "D-73".

=== Financial problems ===
Facing increasing financial difficulties, in February 1989 the license for this station was involuntarily transferred from Excelsior Broadcasting Corporation to Excelsior Broadcasting Corporation, Debtor-In-Possession. The involuntary transfer was approved by the FCC on March 2, 1989. In April 1989, Vascular Diagnostic Labs bought out the previous shareholders of Excelsior Broadcasting Corporation, the licensee for this station. The transfer of control was approved by the FCC on July 13, 1989.

In August 1989, with the financial issues resolved and the previous shareholders bought out, Excelsior Broadcasting Corporation was dissolved and the license was involuntarily transferred to Vascular Diagnostic Labs owner Dr. Merlin Kelsick. The transfer was approved by the FCC on November 29, 1990.

=== News and talk ===
The call letters were changed to WBBI on August 19, 1991, after Dr. Merlin Kelsick completed a deal to sell the station to Phoenix Capital Corporation. The deal was approved by the FCC on September 12, 1991, and the transaction was consummated on September 17, 1991. The station then switched to a news/talk format.

The station's callsign was changed to WKMW on June 1, 1993. In June 1993, Phoenix Capital Corporation reached an agreement to sell WKMW to Madison Radio Company, Inc. The deal was approved by the FCC on July 19, 1993, and the transaction was consummated on October 28, 1993.

=== Sports radio ===
In May 1995, Madison Radio Company, Inc., reached an agreement to sell the station to Tennessee Valley Radio, Inc. The deal was approved by the FCC on July 31, 1995, and the transaction was consummated on October 3, 1995. The new owners had the FCC change the station's call letters to the current WUMP on October 6, 1995. The new call sign was chosen to match the station's new sports radio format and branding as "The Ump", an abbreviation of umpire.

=== Corporate ownership ===
The Dunnavant family of Athens owned the station from the early 1990s until agreeing to sell it to Cumulus Broadcasting in 2003. This ended a 55-year presence in the area by Athens Broadcasting, founded in 1948 by Homer Felix "Pap" Dunnavant.

On April 1, 2003, WUMP was sold by Athens Broadcasting Co. (William E. Dunnavant, president) to Cumulus Broadcasting Inc. as part of a four-station deal with a total sale price of $22 million in cash and Cumulus common stock. The acquisition of the stations was completed in July 2003. WUMP remains co-owned with former Dunnavant stations WVNN and WZYP, in addition to WHRP and WWFF-FM.

In August 2025, WUMP rebranded as "Jox Huntsville".

== Programming ==
=== Sports ===
The UMP currently is the home of The JOX Roundtable airing from 6 to 10 a.m. Following that is 3 Man Front from 10 a.m. to 2 p.m. The afternoon drive is anchored by Lockdown Coverage with Arky Shea and Jason Marks from 2 to 6 p.m. Weekend programming includes The Bullpen with Tony Mac and Tricky Ricky Fernandez on Saturdays from 9 to 11 a.m. Evening and most weekend programming is from Infinity Sports Network when not preempted by live sporting events.

The UMP has an affiliation with the Westwood One network. As such, WUMP airs all prime-time NFL games including Sunday Night Football, Monday Night Football, Thursday Night Football and the specialty prime-time games on Thanksgiving, Christmas, as well as Saturday games during December. These are in addition to the Sunday-afternoon doubleheader.

The UMP is an affiliate of the Alabama Crimson Tide network, carrying every football and basketball game, the baseball slate against SEC teams and in the postseason, and a selection of women's basketball games.

In 2018, The UMP became an affiliate of the Tennessee Titans of the NFL and of the Nashville Predators of the NHL.

Part of the UMP's affiliation with Westwood One allows the UMP to carry a large package of NCAA basketball games, the March Madness tournament, the NCAA Division I Men's Ice Hockey Tournament, the College World Series, the Women's College World Series and select NHL games, including the Winter Classic and the NHL Playoffs concluding with the Stanley Cup.

During the spring through the early fall, the UMP is the Huntsville-area station for Atlanta Braves baseball.

=== Network affiliation ===
The station is currently an affiliate of CBS Sports Radio. The station was an ESPN Radio affiliate in the late 1990s and early 2000s before losing it to then-rival WTKI (1450 AM) in late 2002. The affiliation returned to WUMP on February 6, 2007, after WTKI was sold and changed formats.

== Translators ==
WUMP's programming is also carried on an FM translator station for listeners who prefer the FM dial. WUMP programming first appeared on the FM signal on November 26, 2008.

Broadcast translator for WUMP
Call sign	Frequency	City of license	FID	ERP (W)	Class	FCC info
W280BA	103.9 FM	Madison, Alabama	65219	99	D	LMS
