= Brindley Mountain =

Mountain in Alabama, United States

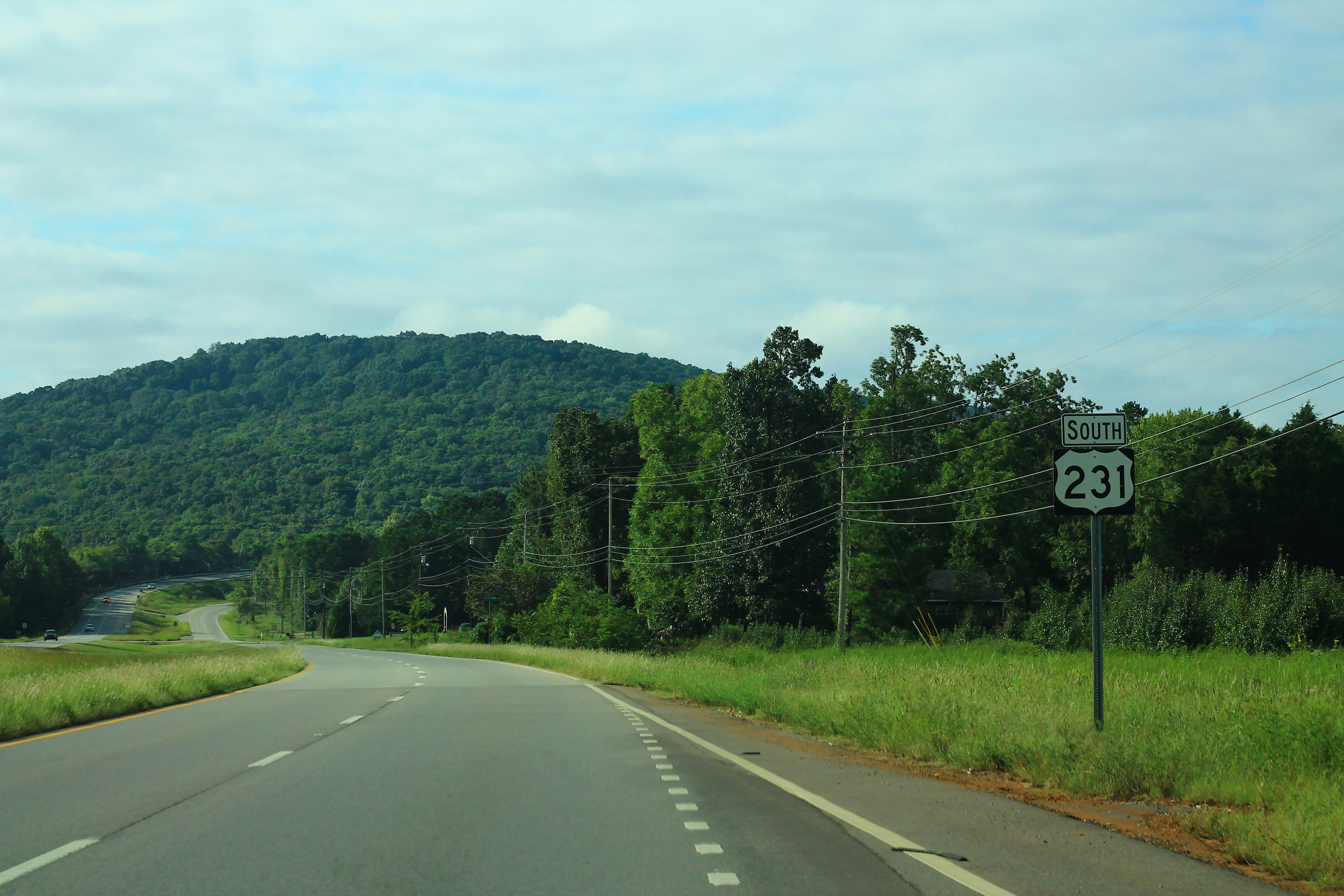
- Brindley Mountain from U.S. Route 231

Highest point
- Elevation: 1,322 ft (403 m)
- Listing: List of mountains of the United States
- Coordinates: 34°29′23″N 86°37′35″W

Geography
- Location within Alabama
- Location: Alabama, U.S.
- Topo map: USGS Center Grove

Brindley Mountain (or "Brindlee Mountain") is an isolated portion of the Appalachian Plateau in northern Alabama. It occupies significant portions of Cullman, Morgan, and Marshall Counties and extends into Winston and Lawrence counties. The plateau is formed by a sandstone cap-rock overlying limestone. The main mountain sits south of Lacey's Spring and houses communities such as Union Hill and Morgan City as well as parts of Union Grove and spans into Arab also. U.S. Route 231 runs over Brindley Mountain. The highest point of Brindley Mountain rests in Morgan City. A shale layer about 75–100 feet down from the top of the mountain created bluffs on all sides of the mountain, as well as caused road replacements to be necessary on Union Hill Rd / James Frazier Rd and US Hwy 231 immediately north of the Whitesburg Mountains. The shale layer is visible at the top of the quarry off of Union Hill Rd. The cement mixer on the side of Union Hill Rd originated in a wrecked vehicle on the original road alignment of Union Hill Rd, visible on older USGS 1:24000 topographical maps.

Several radio stations have broadcast towers located on Brindley Mountain. Those include WRSA, WTAK, WZZN, WAFN-FM, WRJL, and WRAB.
