= WIEZ =

WIEZ may refer to:

- WIEZ (AM), a radio station (1490 AM) licensed to serve Decatur, Alabama, United States
- WVES (FM), a radio station (101.5 FM) licensed to serve Chincoteague, Virginia, United States, which held the call sign WIEZ in 2017
- WLUI, a radio station (670 AM) licensed to serve Lewistown, Pennsylvania, United States, which held the call sign WIEZ from 1985 to 2017
