= WZYP =

- Athens, Alabama; United States
- Broadcast area: Huntsville, Alabama
- Frequency: 104.3 MHz
- Branding: 104.3 ZYP

Programming
- Format: Top 40 (CHR)
- Affiliations: United Stations Radio Networks; Westwood One

Ownership
- Owner: Cumulus Media; (Cumulus Licensing LLC)
- Sister stations: WHRP, WUMP, WVNN, WVNN-FM

History
- First air date: 1958 (as WJOF)
- Former call signs: WJOF (1958–1980)

Technical information
- Licensing authority: FCC
- Facility ID: 3083
- Class: C
- ERP: 100,000 watts
- HAAT: 340 meters (1,120 ft)
- Transmitter coordinates: 34°49′05″N 86°44′16″W

Links
- Public license information: Public file; LMS
- Webcast: Listen live
- Website: wzyp.com

WZYP (104.3 FM, "104.3 'ZYP") is a top 40 (CHR) music-formatted radio station licensed to serve Athens, Alabama, and broadcasting in the Huntsville, Alabama, area. The station is owned by Cumulus Media and formerly broadcast in HD. The broadcast signal can be heard throughout northern Alabama and much of southern central Tennessee. Its studios are in Athens and its transmitter is in Madison, Alabama.

== History ==
The radio station was founded by the Dunnavant family of Athens, Alabama (which remains its city of license), as WJOF. Prior to its 1978 format change to Top 40/CHR, WJOF featured a mixture of beautiful music and, at night, country music.

On June 10, 1980, the call letters were switched to the current WZYP. Through most of the 1980s, WZYP was northern Alabama's top-rated station, dethroned only by WDRM when WDRM's country experienced a resurgence in popularity among young people in the late 1980s and 1990s. Nonetheless, it has remained among the Huntsville market's most-listened-to stations through the mid-2000s.

== Ownership ==
On April 1, 2003, WZYP was sold by Athens Broadcasting Co. (William E. Dunnavant, president) to Cumulus Broadcasting Inc. as part of a four-station deal with a sale price of $22 million in cash and Cumulus common stock. The acquisition of the stations was completed in July 2003. WZYP remains co-owned with former Dunnavant stations WVNN and WUMP, in addition to WHRP and WWFF-FM. This ended a 55-year presence in the market by Athens Broadcasting, founded in 1948 by Homer Felix "Pap" Dunnavant.
