= WYAM (AM) =

Simulcasts WIEZ Decatur
- Hartselle, Alabama; United States
- Broadcast area: Huntsville, Alabama
- Frequency: 890 kHz
- Branding: 94.7 La Raza

Programming
- Format: Regional Mexican

Ownership
- Owner: Signal Mountain Broadcasting, LLC
- Sister stations: WYAM-LD

History
- First air date: October 1, 1956
- Former call signs: WHRT

Technical information
- Licensing authority: FCC
- Facility ID: 17352
- Class: D
- Power: 2,500 watts day
- Transmitter coordinates: 34°34′00″N 86°54′46″W

Links
- Public license information: Public file; LMS
- Website: 947laraza.com

WYAM (890 kHz) is a regional Mexican formatted AM radio station licensed to serve Hartselle, Alabama. The station primarily serves the Huntsville, Alabama, area. It is owned by Signal Mountain Broadcasting, LLC.

Due to FCC regulations, the station must sign-off at sunset to protect Chicago's WLS. The WYAM transmitter is located about 1 mile (2 km) south of the Tennessee River adjacent to I-65.

== Programming ==
The station is one of three in the area that broadcast in Spanish. The others are WKAC (1080 AM) in Athens (which broadcasts part-time in English) and WJHX (620 AM) in Lexington.

The station is also an affiliate of the American Family Radio network.

WYAM carried limited OSRN programming, and is a former affiliate of the now-defunct Outdoor Sports Radio Network.

WYAM also has a television department, WYAM TV51, which airs live programming and satellite programming from around the country, offers video editing services, and ad buys for commercials advertising.

== History ==
The station has previously aired Gospel music and Oldies formats. Until June 1, 1994, the station's call sign was WHRT.

Another station in the Huntsville market, WTAK-FM, was assigned the WYAM call letters from November 15, 1991 until July 6, 1993.

== Ownership ==
In September 1999, WYAM was sold to Priority Communications LLC (Danis L. Willingham and James D. Early, members) by WAJF Inc. (d/b/a Grass Roots American Inc.) for a reported sale price of $75,000. In September 2003, Priority Communications consummated its transfer of the WYAM license to Decatur Communications Properties LLC.

In 2022, the Wileys announced their intention to retire after selling WYAM radio and television, which were listed for $3.4 million. The stations were sold to Pelham, Alabama–based Signal Mountain Broadcasting in a deal that was completed on January 7, 2026.
