= WDPT =

WDPT may refer to:

- WDPT-LP, a low-power radio station (103.9 FM) licensed to serve Panama City, Florida, United States
- WIEZ (AM), a radio station (1490 AM) licensed to serve Decatur, Alabama, United States, known as WDPT from 2006 to 2009.
- WHIO-FM, a radio station (95.7 FM) licensed to serve Pleasant Hill, Ohio, United States, known as WDPT-FM from 2000 to 2006.
