= WRSA =

WRSA may refer to:

- WRSA-FM, a radio station (96.9 FM) licensed to Holly Pond, Alabama, United States
- WKAF (AM), a radio station (1420 AM) licensed to St. Albans, Vermont, United States, which held the call sign WRSA from 2002 to 2024
- WRSA (New York), a defunct radio station (1280 AM) in Saratoga Springs, New York, United States
- Western Returned Scholars Association, an organization in China
