= WLOR =

Radio station in Huntsville, Alabama

Currently silent
- Huntsville, Alabama; United States
- Broadcast area: Tennessee Valley
- Frequency: 1550 kHz

Ownership
- Owner: Southern Stone Communications, LLC
- Sister stations: WAHR, WRTT-FM

History
- First air date: November 1946
- Former call signs: WHBS (1946–1958); WAAY (1958–1989); WAAJ (1989–1993)
- Former frequencies: 1490 kHz (1946–1953)

Technical information
- Licensing authority: FCC
- Facility ID: 39508
- Class: D
- Power: 50,000 watts (day); 44 watts (night)
- Transmitter coordinates: 34°51′09″N 86°39′10″W
- Translator: 107.5 W298BZ (Huntsville)

Links
- Public license information: Public file; LMS

WLOR (1550 AM) is a radio station licensed to Huntsville, Alabama, United States, serving the greater Tennessee Valley area that is currently silent. WLOR is owned by Southern Stone Communications, LLC, with studios located off University Drive (U.S. 72) in Huntsville, and transmitter sited north of the city.

== History ==
=== Early days ===
Great American WAAY 1970s

The station originally started on November 10, 1946, as WHBS (Huntsville's Best Station") on 1490 AM (1,000 watts day/250 night), which was owned by The Huntsville Times. It later added an FM simulcast in 1948 on 95.1 FM, which was discontinued around 1955. The station moved to 1550 kHz, with an increase of daytime power to 5,000 watts/500 night, on November 4, 1952. (The 1490 frequency would later go to then-WAJF, later-WDPT and WEKI, now WIEZ a year later.) From 1958 to 1989, this station used the call letters WAAY as the Top 40-formatted AM sister station of WAAY-TV. The station went to 50,000 watts-daytime power in 1980 (the maximum output permitted for U.S. AM radio stations) and then operated from a separate daytime and nighttime site until 1991. WAAY also was the first station to broadcast in AM stereo in the Huntsville market in 1984, using the Kahn-Hazeltine stereo system. Both WAAY-AM-TV stations were owned and operated by Smith Broadcasting, a local family that has since divested its broadcasting interests.

=== Finding religion ===
'80s AM STEREO logo

When the AM station was sold, the new owners were required to change the callsign. They chose WAAJ in April 1989 to accompany the station's change to a Southern gospel music and religious format. This format and callsign ran until April 1993, when the station became WLOR. At around 1998, WLOR returned to the air with a black gospel format (daytime only, as the nighttime site had been demolished).

In March 2000, the station was purchased by STG Media LLC (Steven J. Shelton, president) for a reported sale price of $425,000. In November 2001, due to a proposed refinancing of the parent company, STG Media, LLC, applied to the FCC to transfer the licenses of WAHR, WLOR, and WRTT-FM to Black Crow Media Group subsidiary BCA Media, LLC. Just two days later, another application was filed to shift the licenses to BCA Radio, LLC. The FCC approved the moves on November 15, 2001, and the consummation of the transaction occurred on November 19, 2001. In July 2002 the station began the "Jammin' 1550" branding and in early 2002 nighttime operations resumed from the daytime site.

=== True Oldies ===
In June 2008, ABC's The Touch programming was replaced with ABC's True Oldies Channel format. This "true oldies" format was programmed by legendary disc jockey Scott Shannon.

An FM simulcast of WLOR started on May 1, 2009, on FM translator W251AC at 98.1 FM with a transmitter located on Drake Mountain. The station was re-branded as "Sunny 98". (The 98.1 translator was previously operated as a WQPR/WBUZ/WKDF translator on Capshaw Mountain.) The station would later drop the True Oldies format and shift to urban oldies.

In January 2010, Black Crow Media Group and its subsidiaries filed for Chapter 11 bankruptcy, seeking to reorganize rather than be broken up. Their filing with the FCC notified the Commission of the involuntary transfer of the license from BCA Radio, LLC, to an entity known as BCA Radio, LLC, Debtor-In-Possession.

In November 2011, Black Crow Media Group announced that it was reorganizing its radio holdings and consolidating the four subsidiaries acting as debtors in possession (including BCA Radio, LLC) into a new company named Southern Stone Communications, LLC. The FCC approved the transfer on December 19, 2011.

On February 1, 2017, at 10 a.m., WLOR began stunting with TV theme songs. At noon, WLOR changed its format to classic hip hop, branded as "98.1 The Beat". The first song on "The Beat" was "Empire State of Mind" by Jay-Z and Alicia Keys.

On December 2, 2019, WLOR dropped the classic hip hop format (which continues on W251AC/WAHR-HD2) and began stunting with Christmas music, branded as "The Christmas Star 107.5".

== Technical changes ==
On June 19, 2007, the station was granted a construction permit to downgrade from a class B to a class D station using a single-transmitter site and a nighttime power reduction from 500 watts to just 44 watts. The station was licensed to operate as a class D at reduced nighttime power on April 24, 2008.

On December 5, 2016, WLOR was granted a Federal Communications Commission construction permit to decrease daytime power to 28,000 watts, decrease nighttime power to 15 watts and change from two (day and night) three-tower directional patterns to a one-tower omnidirectional pattern.

== Translators ==
WLOR programming is also carried on an FM broadcast translator station to extend or improve the coverage area of the AM frequency.

Broadcast translator for WLOR
Call sign	Frequency	City of license	FID	ERP (W)	Class	FCC info
W298BZ	107.5 FM	Huntsville, Alabama	140190	250	D	LMS

== See also ==
List of radio stations in Alabama
