= WQRV =

Radio station in Huntsville, Alabama

- Meridianville, Alabama; United States
- Broadcast area: Huntsville metropolitan area
- Frequency: 100.3 MHz (HD Radio)
- Branding: 100.3 The River

Programming
- Format: Classic Hits
- Subchannels: HD2: Top 40 (CHR) "106.5 KISS-FM"; HD3: Alternative rock "ALT HSV"
- Affiliations: Premiere Networks

Ownership
- Owner: iHeartMedia, Inc.; (iHM Licenses, LLC)
- Sister stations: WDRM; WBHP; WTAK-FM

History
- First air date: May 2, 1962; 63 years ago (as WVNA-FM Tuscumbia)
- Former call signs: WVNA-FM (1962–2000); WLAY-FM (2000–2006)
- Call sign meaning: "River"

Technical information
- Licensing authority: FCC
- Facility ID: 19456
- Class: C2
- ERP: 8,500 watts
- HAAT: 299 meters (981 ft)
- Transmitter coordinates: 34°47′36.3″N 86°37′51″W
- Translator: HD2: 106.5 W293AH (Huntsville)

Links
- Public license information: Public file; LMS
- Webcast: Listen live (via iHeartRadio); HD2: Listen live (via iHeartRadio); HD3: Listen live (via iHeartRadio)
- Website: 1003theriver.iheart.com; HD2: 1065kissfm.iheart.com; HD3: althsv.iheart.com

WQRV (100.3 FM "100.3 The River") is a commercial radio station licensed to Meridianville, Alabama, and serving the Huntsville metropolitan area. It broadcasts a classic hits radio format and is owned by iHeartMedia. The studios are on Peoples Road near Interstate 565 in Madison, Alabama. On weekdays, WQRV carries two nationally syndicated programs: The Rick Burgess Show from WZZK-FM Birmingham in morning drive time and The Martha Quinn Show from Premiere Networks in middays.

WQRV has an effective radiated power (ERP) of 8,500 watts. The transmitter tower is off NW Juniper Drive in Huntsville. WQRV broadcasts using HD Radio technology. The HD2 subchannel has a Top 40 (CHR) format as "106.5 KISS-FM". That feeds an FM translator at 106.5 MHz. The HD3 subchannel plays alternative rock as "ALT HSV".

== History ==
On May 6, 1962, the station signed on the air. Its original call sign was WVNA-FM, the sister station to WVNA 1590 AM in Tuscumbia. At first, the two stations would simulcast their programming. But by the 1970s, WVNA-FM had an automated beautiful music format. It would play quarter-hour sweeps of mostly soft, instrumental music.

WLAY logo

WVNA-FM switched to country music and changed its call letters to WLAY-FM on March 30, 2000. This lasted until a 2006 when the station became known as "The River." The station was assigned the WQRV call letters by the Federal Communications Commission on March 10, 2006.

WQRV's format was flipped in April 2006, relocated from the former WWXQ (92.5 FM) and WXQW (94.1 FM), which Clear Channel Communications (the forerunner of iHeartMedia) had sold to Cumulus Media. Those stations were known collectively as "WXQ". The station frequency was transferred from Florence, Alabama, to the Huntsville radio market. The new city of license became Meridianville, a community north of Huntsville.

The station originally broadcast a more classic rock-based classic hits format under The River branding. Eventually, by the late 2000s, it had shifted to more mainstream classic hits of the 1960s, 1970s, and 1980s, while still mixing in some rock hits. The station now concentrates on the 1980s, 90s and 2000s in its playlist.

Rick and Bubba, a popular syndicated comedy and Southern-culture morning show, relocated to WQRV from crosstown rival WRTT-FM on January 2, 2008. In January 2025, Rick & Bubba changed its name to The Rick Burgess Show after Bill "Bubba" Bussey decided to step down from fulltime broadcasting.

== HD Radio ==
On November 9, 2012, WQRV-HD2 dropped its simulcast of sister station WBHP and began stunting with Christmas music for the holidays as "Christmas 106.5" (simulcast on translator W293AH). On December 26, WQRV-HD2 flipped to Top 40/CHR as "106.5 KISS FM", launching with 10,065 songs in a row played commercial-free. The first song on "106.5 KISS FM" was "Die Young" by Kesha.

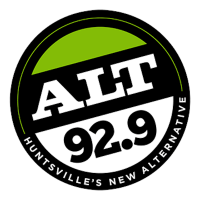
"Alt 92.9" logo

On September 13, 2018, after briefly stunting with baseball-related music as "Trash Pandas Radio", WQRV-HD3 launched an alternative rock format as Alt 92.9. It was carried on translator station W225AH.

On April 7, 2022, W225AH signed off and WQRV-HD3 rebranded as "ALT HSV".
