= WBHP =

- Decatur, Alabama; United States
- Broadcast area: Huntsville metropolitan area
- Frequency: 800 kHz
- Branding: News Radio 102.5

Programming
- Format: Talk radio
- Affiliations: Fox News Radio; Premiere Networks

Ownership
- Owner: iHeartMedia, Inc.; (iHM Licenses, LLC)
- Sister stations: WDRM; WQRV; WTAK-FM

History
- First air date: October 1948
- Former call signs: WHOS (1948–2025)
- Call sign meaning: Wilton "Buster" H. Pollard, former owner of WBHP (1230 AM)

Technical information
- Licensing authority: FCC
- Facility ID: 44023
- Class: D
- Power: 1,000 watts (day); 215 watts (night)
- Transmitter coordinates: 34°35′55.3″N 87°0′24″W
- Translator: 102.5 W273CX (Huntsville)
- Repeater: 102.1 WDRM-HD2 (Decatur)

Links
- Public license information: Public file; LMS
- Webcast: Listen live (via iHeartRadio)
- Website: wbhpam.iheart.com

WBHP (800 AM) is a commercial radio station licensed to Decatur, Alabama, United States, and serves Huntsville, northwest Alabama and south-central Tennessee. Owned by iHeartMedia, WBHP broadcasts a talk format with studios on Peoples Road near Interstate 565 in Madison, Alabama.

WBHP's transmitter is sited off 2nd Street SW at 14th Avenue SW in Decatur. The station is simulcast on an FM translator at 102.5 MHz in Huntsville, and on the second HD Radio channel of WDRM (102.1 FM).

== History ==
=== Early years ===
The station signed on the air in October 1948 as WHOS, a 1,000-watt daytime-only station broadcasting at 800 kHz. Originally owned by North Alabama Broadcasting, the station was randomly assigned the WHOS call letters by the Federal Communications Commission; they did not stand for anything in particular.

As a daytime-only station, WHOS could not broadcast at night. XEROK in Ciudad Juarez is the Class A station on the frequency and WHOS had to go off the air to avoid interference. WHOS ran a country music format for most of its first 40 years.

=== Financial problems ===
In February 1987, the broadcast license for WHOS was transferred from Dixie Broadcasting, Inc., to Dixie Broadcasting, Inc. as Debtor-In-Possession. The transfer was approved by the FCC on February 26, 1987. Dixie Broadcasting had filed bankruptcy in an effort to stave off an adverse civil lawsuit outcome regarding the contracted sale of WDRM to W.H. Pollard, Jr., the then-owner of WBHP (1230 AM) in Huntsville, Alabama.

In October 1988, the station, which had been airing a Southern Gospel music format, flipped to an all-Elvis Presley format. It used the advertising tagline "WHOS alive?". This novel format garnered the station national media attention, but failed to gain a local audience and lasted just six months, in effect a lengthy stunt. After the Elvis format ended, WHOS switched to a simulcast of WDRM and its country music format, which was by this time very successful and among North Alabama's top-rated stations.

In January 1992, a deal was reached for the broadcast license for WHOS to be transferred from Dixie Broadcasting, Inc. as Debtor-In-Possession back to Dixie Broadcasting, Inc. The deal was approved by the FCC on March 26, 1992, and the transaction was consummated on September 15, 1992.

=== Mountain Lakes Broadcasting ===
In December 1991, Dixie Broadcasting, Inc., reached an agreement to merge ownership of this station with the ownership of WBHP to a new company named Mountain Lakes Broadcasting, Inc., pending the resolution of Dixie's legal difficulties. In October 1993, with Dixie Broadcasting back in good financial standing and the legal issues settled by the appeals courts, the merger moved forward. The deal was approved by the FCC on November 3, 1993, and the transaction was consummated on November 11, 1993.

In November 1996, J. Mack Bramlett, W.H. Pollard Jr., and Trust B Under The Will Of W.H. Pollard Sr. reached an agreement to transfer control of Mountain Lakes Broadcasting, licensee of this station as well as WDRM and WBHP, to Osborn Communications Corporation. The deal was approved by the FCC on January 29, 1997. By May 1997, the three stations were part of the Capstar group, which was also in the process of acquiring WWXQ, WXQW, and WTAK-FM. In November 1997, WHOS and WBHP dropped their shared country music format for an all-news format featuring CNN Radio 24 hours a day.

Capstar and Chancellor Media announced in August 1998 that they would merge (Hicks, Muse, Tate & Furst was a major shareholder in both companies); upon the merger's completion in July 1999, the combined company was named AMFM Inc. In September 1998, Mountain Lakes Broadcasting, LLC, filed to transfer the WHOS license to Ameron Broadcasting Corporation. The transfer was approved by the FCC on October 2, 1998, and the transaction was consummated on November 5, 1998. In February 1999, Ameron filed to transfer the station to Capstar Royalty II Corporation. This was approved by the FCC on March 2, 1999, and the transaction was consummated on March 5, 1999.

=== Clear Channel ownership ===
AMFM was acquired by Clear Channel Communications (forerunner to iHeartMedia) in a deal announced on October 4, 1999, and completed in August 2000. The five Huntsville stations affected in the merger were a small part of the larger $16.6 billion transaction.

WHOS's simulcast with WBHP ended in 2024, after that station's tower collapsed; WBHP's programming would continue on WHOS, WDRM-HD2, and FM translator W273CX (102.5 FM). The WBHP license was surrendered in February 2025; on March 4, iHeartMedia filed to change WHOS's call sign to WBHP effective March 31.

== Former on-air staff ==
Notable former WHOS on-air staff included George Rose, who, along with his alter-ego "Cousin Josh" character, hosted "The Cousin Josh Jam-O-Ree" on several North Alabama radio stations in a career that began in 1948 and ended with his death in 2006.

== Programming ==
Weekdays on WBHP begin with Alabama's Morning News with JT, based at co-owned WERC-FM in Birmingham. The rest of the weekday schedule is made up of nationally syndicated talk shows, mostly from co-owned Premiere Networks: The Glenn Beck Radio Program, The Sean Hannity Show, The Michael Berry Show, The Jesse Kelly Show, Our American Stories with Lee Habeeb and Coast to Coast AM with George Noory.

Weekends feature shows on money, health, technology, travel and religion. Weekend syndicated programs include Rudy Maxa World Travel, The Weekend with Michael Brown, Armstrong & Getty, Rich DeMuro on Tech, The Ben Ferguson Show and Sunday Night with Bill Cunningham. Most hours begin with an update from Fox News Radio.

In addition to its regularly scheduled talk programming, the station is an affiliate of the Auburn Tigers football radio network. It also carries Auburn Tigers men's basketball.

=== Former programming ===
WHOS and sister station WBHP were the broadcast flagships for the 1999-2000 final season of the Huntsville Channel Cats and for the short-lived Huntsville Tornado for the 2000-2001 hockey season. Both teams played their home games at the Von Braun Center and competed in the Central Hockey League.
