= WAHR =

Huntsville, Alabama; United States
- Broadcast area: Huntsville metropolitan area
- Frequency: 99.1 MHz (HD Radio)
- Branding: Star 99.1

Programming
- Format: Hot adult contemporary
- Subchannels: HD2: Urban contemporary

Ownership
- Owner: Southern Stone Communications, LLC
- Sister stations: WLOR, WRTT-FM

History
- First air date: July 28, 1959
- Call sign meaning: Arnold Hornbuckle's Records

Technical information
- Licensing authority: FCC
- Facility ID: 70501
- Class: C0
- ERP: 100,000 watts
- HAAT: 300 meters (980 ft)
- Transmitter coordinates: 34°47′53″N 86°38′24″W
- Translator: HD2: 98.1 W251AC (Capshaw)

Links
- Public license information: Public file; LMS
- Webcast: Listen live; Listen live (HD2)
- Website: www.mystar991.com; www.981thebeat.com (HD2)

WAHR (99.1 FM, "Star 99.1") is a commercial radio station licensed to Huntsville, Alabama, United States. It broadcasts a hot adult contemporary format, and is owned by Southern Stone Communications, LLC. WAHR's studios are off University Drive (U.S. 72) in Huntsville, and the transmitter is sited on NW Juniper Drive, north of the city. WAHR broadcasts in HD Radio: the HD2 subchannel carries an urban contemporary format known as "98.1 The Beat", which feeds low-power FM translator W251AC at 98.1 MHz in Capshaw.

== History ==
=== Arnold Hornbuckle ===
WAHR signed on the air on July 28, 1959. It was founded by Huntsville businessman Arnold Hornbuckle. WAHR was Alabama's first stand-alone FM radio station, without an AM companion. The call letters stand for 'Arnold Hornbuckle Records.' At the time of licensing, he owned Hornbuckle's Record Shop, also in Huntsville. Shortly after the station began broadcasting, Bill Lane became the station's manager and a minority shareholder. Lane retired in 1990.

From its founding, the station had its studios and offices in the Times Building on East Holmes Avenue, headquarters for The Huntsville Daily Times. In the early 1960s, a signature station phrase was "Broadcasting from the top of The Times Building." Some of the station's early program hosts were U.S. Army servicemen stationed at Redstone Arsenal. The station received a fan letter from noted aerospace engineer Dr. Wernher von Braun complimenting the station on its classical music programs. By the 1970s, the station had dropped fine arts programming in favor of what became known as adult contemporary music, which is roughly its present format. (Public radio station WLRH took over classical broadcasting to the area when it began in 1976.)

After nearly 40 years serving the Tennessee Valley, Hornbuckle retired, selling the station in July 1999. In 2009, Hornbuckle was inducted into the Alabama Broadcasters Association Hall of Fame. He died in 2012.

=== Black Crow Media ===
WAHR was acquired by Black Crow Media Group, whose other local radio stations include WRTT-FM and WLOR. In November 2001, due to a proposed refinancing of the parent company, license holder STG Media, LLC, applied to the FCC to transfer the licenses of WAHR, WLOR, and WRTT-FM to Black Crow Media Group subsidiary BCA Media, LLC. Just two days later, another application was filed to shift the licenses to BCA Radio, LLC. The FCC approved the moves on November 15, 2001, and the consummation of the transaction occurred on November 19, 2001.

In June 2009, the station transitioned from an adult contemporary music format to a Hot AC music mix. As of May 2013, though, the station had returned to its former mainstream AC format.

=== Chapter 11 ===
In January 2010, Black Crow Media Group and its subsidiaries filed for "Chapter 11" bankruptcy, seeking to reorganize rather than be broken up. A filing with the FCC notified the Commission of the involuntary transfer of the license from BCA Radio, LLC, to an entity known as BCA Radio, LLC, Debtor-In-Possession.

In November 2011, Black Crow Media Group announced that it was reorganizing its radio holdings and consolidating the four subsidiaries acting as debtors in possession (including BCA Radio, LLC) into a new company named Southern Stone Communications, LLC. The FCC approved the transfer on December 19, 2011.

== Awards ==
In November 2007, WAHR won the American Cancer Society's Mid-South Division award for best radio supporter for 2006-07. The station was cited for having "strongly supported" the ACS's Relay for Life, gala, golf tournament and other events sponsored by the national and local cancer organizations.
