= WRTT-FM =

- Huntsville, Alabama; United States
- Broadcast area: Tennessee Valley
- Frequency: 95.1 MHz
- Branding: Rocket 95.1

Programming
- Format: Active rock

Ownership
- Owner: Southern Stone Communications, LLC
- Sister stations: WAHR, WLOR

History
- First air date: October 6, 1960
- Former call signs: WNDA (1960–2000)
- Former frequencies: 92.9 MHz (1960–1964)
- Call sign meaning: Rocket

Technical information
- Licensing authority: FCC
- Facility ID: 71462
- Class: C2
- ERP: 13,500 watts
- HAAT: 277 meters (909 ft)
- Transmitter coordinates: 34°47′53″N 86°38′24″W

Links
- Public license information: Public file; LMS
- Webcast: Listen live
- Website: TheRocket951.com

WRTT-FM (95.1 FM, "Rocket 95.1") is a commercial radio station licensed to Huntsville, Alabama, and airing an active rock format. It is owned by the Black Crow Media Group with the license held by BCA Radio LLC. The studios are located off University Drive (U.S. Highway 72) in Huntsville.

WRTT-FM's transmitter is off NW Juniper Drive, northwest of Huntsville.

== History ==
=== WHBS-FM ===
The 95.1 frequency was home to the first FM radio station in Huntsville. WHBS-FM began broadcasting December 21, 1947. It mainly simulcast WHBS (1490 AM), which was owned by The Huntsville Times.

WHBS-AM moved to 1550 AM and increased power to 5,000 day/500 night watts in 1952. (It previously broadcast 1,000 day/250 night on 1490 AM.) Until 1956, the FM station broadcast from a transmitter near Bankhead Parkway/Tollgate Road with 10,000 watts. The station had about a 150-mile coverage area with a good antenna. The AM station was sold to Smith Broadcasting in 1958 and became WAAY radio (now WLOR, co-owned with WRTT-FM).

=== WNDA ===
On October 8, 1960, a new radio station, WNDA, began broadcasting with 3,100 watts of effective radiated power on a frequency of 92.9 megahertz. Under the ownership of Hughey Broadcasting Company, WNDA served Huntsville and surrounding communities with an easy listening music format. In 1964, the station moved to the current 95.1 MHz frequency.

On May 1, 1970, WNDA was purchased by the Wells Broadcasting Company and its format shifted from easy listening to Christian radio spirituals and teaching programs. The station was the first in northern Alabama to broadcast Contemporary Christian music, which eventually became WNDA's staple programming. This format was heard on WNDA for nearly 30 years. Also during much of that time, WNDA was the local home for the Texaco-sponsored Metropolitan Opera broadcasts on Saturday afternoons for years instead of public radio station 89.3 WLRH. (In most cities, the opera broadcasts were carried by a local non-commercial classical station.)

=== WRTT-FM ===
In January 2000, Wells Broadcasting Company, Inc. agreed to sell WNDA to STG Media, LLC. The FCC approved the deal on March 7, 2000, and the transaction was consummated on May 1, 2000, exactly 30 years to the day when Wells bought WNDA.

While the sale was in progress, the station's call sign was changed to "WRTT-FM". The station dropped its longtime Christian radio format. It flipped to classic rock, branded as "Rocket 95.1". It eventually evolved into a modern rock playlist.

=== Financial problems ===
In November 2001, due to a proposed refinancing of its parent company, STG Media applied to the Federal Communications Commission (FCC) to transfer the licenses of WAHR, WLOR, and WRTT-FM to Black Crow Media Group subsidiary BCA Media, LLC. Just two days later, another application was filed to shift the licenses to BCA Radio, LLC. The FCC approved the moves on November 15, 2001, and the consummation of the transaction occurred on November 19, 2001.

In January 2010, Black Crow Media Group and its subsidiaries filed for "Chapter 11" bankruptcy, seeking to reorganize rather than be broken up. Their filing with the FCC notified the commission of the involuntary transfer of the license from BCA Radio, LLC, to an entity known as BCA Radio, LLC, Debtor-In-Possession.

In November 2011, Black Crow Media Group announced that it was reorganizing its radio holdings and consolidating the four subsidiaries acting as debtors in possession (including BCA Radio, LLC) into a new company named Southern Stone Communications, LLC. The FCC approved the transfer on December 19, 2011.

The station received an FCC construction permit in 2016. It wanted to boost power from 12,000 watts to 13,500 watts. It remained at the same location and antenna height. A license to cover for this power boost was filed in February 2017.

== Programming ==
WRTT-FM focuses on harder-edged rock music, mostly released since 1990. Subgenres include mainstream rock, grunge rock, and heavy metal rock. More recently, Rocket 95.1 has begun to include classic rock titles, to widen its appeal to mature listeners.

The Rick and Bubba Show had been heard in morning drive time on WRTT-FM for seven years in the early 2000s. The program switched to 100.3 WQRV, owned by iHeartMedia, starting January 2, 2008. Rick and Bubba were replaced on Rocket 95.1 by local radio personalities Jerome "Fish" Fisher and Ken Harron. In 2010, the morning team changed to "Jimbo and Casio," who currently host the wake-up show.
