= WRAB =

- Arab, Alabama; United States
- Broadcast area: North Alabama
- Frequency: 1380 kHz

Programming
- Format: Classic country
- Affiliations: Fox News Radio

Ownership
- Owner: Fun Media Group; (Fun Media Group of Alabama LLC)

History
- First air date: 1961
- Call sign meaning: ARAB

Technical information
- Licensing authority: FCC
- Facility ID: 2552
- Class: D
- Power: 1,000 watts day 49 watts night
- Transmitter coordinates: 34°20′06″N 86°28′07″W
- Translator: 107.1 W296DM (Arab)

Links
- Public license information: Public file; LMS
- Webcast: Listen Live
- Website: wrabradio.com

WRAB (1380 AM) is a radio station licensed to serve Arab, Alabama, United States. The station is owned by Fun Media Group, through licensee Fun Media Group of Alabama LLC. WRAB is an affiliate of Fox News Radio. The most popular show on WRAB is "The Helping Hand Show", heard Monday through Saturday from 9:00-9:30am, hosted by Archie Anderson. It airs a classic country format. Southern Gospel music is also played on WRAB and was hosted by Rick Stover from November 2001 until June 2019, when Stover retired. WRAB was, for a short time, an affiliate of Rick and Bubba.

Some memorable names that have been on the air at WRAB: Archie Anderson, Bobby King, Tim Maze, Cousin Jake, Chris Hanson, Big Jim Nelson, Steve Lemons, Kerry Franklin, Ken Henderson and Rick Stover. For a period of time in the late 1980s and early 1990s, WRAB was the sister station of WAFN-FM, which at the time had the call sign of WCRQ. At the time both stations were owned by Kerry Rich.

WRAB's studios are located on Brindlee Mountain Parkway at the office of The Arab Tribune. The station's transmitter is located on State Route 69.

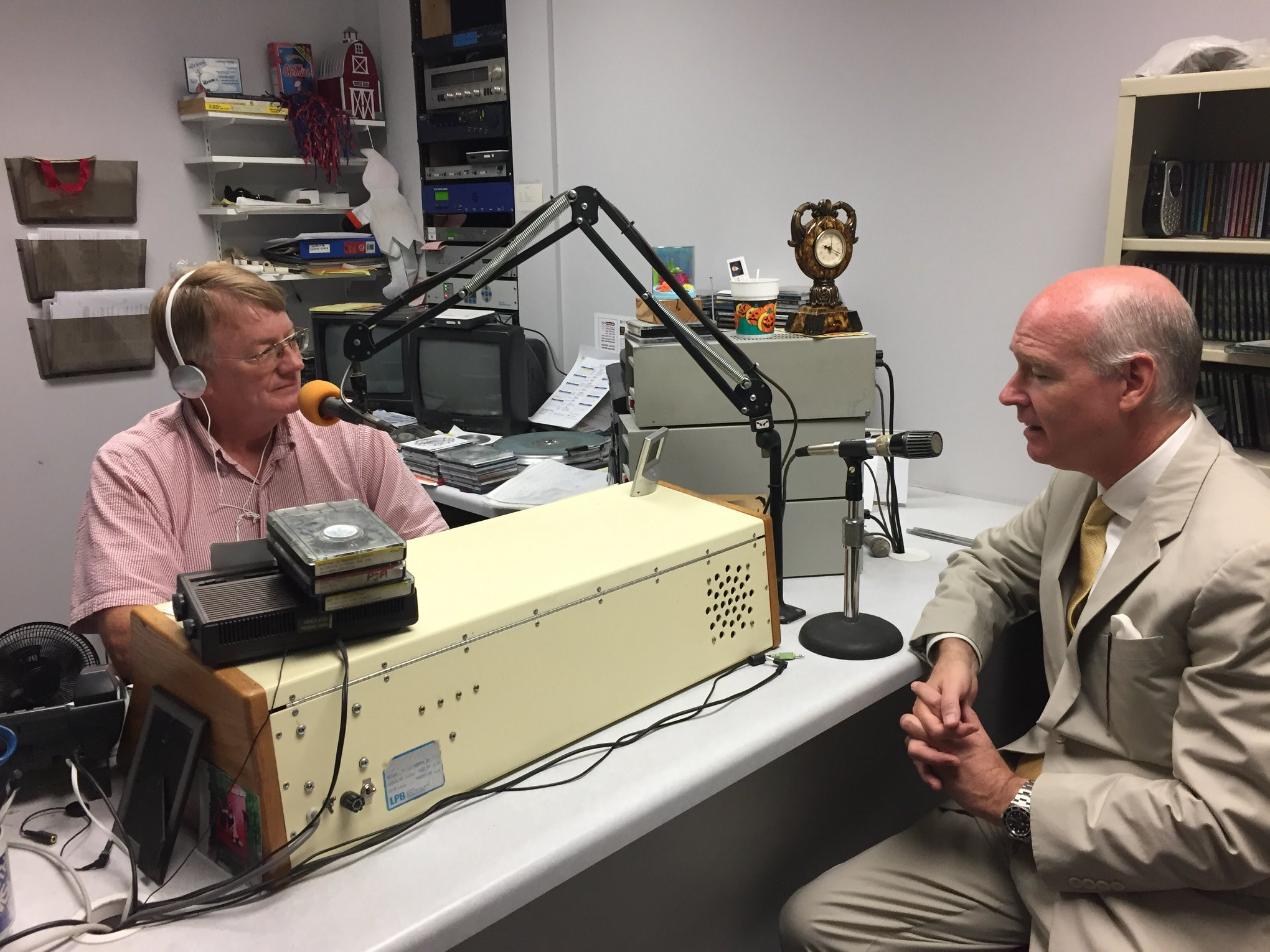
WRAB host Archie Anderson with Robert Aderholt in 2018

The station was assigned the WRAB call letters by the Federal Communications Commission. In August 2017, the FCC awarded WRAB an FM Translator license W296DM and assigned to 107.1 mHz. In March 2020, the translator went active with 250 watts power. The station also broadcasts online at wrabradio.com

In June 2020, Reed Broadcasting sold WRAB and its translator to Fun Media Group, owners of Fun 92.7 WAFN-FM, also located in Arab. This sale returns WRAB and WAFN under the same ownership as it was in the 1990s. In early July 2020, WRAB moved from the building housing The Arab Tribune and into the WAFN studios. The sale, at a price of $100,000, was consummated on August 4, 2020.
