= WVNN-FM =

- Trinity, Alabama; United States
- Broadcast area: Huntsville metropolitan area - North Alabama
- Frequency: 92.5 MHz
- Branding: NewsTalk 770 AM/92.5 FM WVNN

Programming
- Format: News/talk
- Affiliations: Westwood One Network; Premiere Networks; ABC News Radio

Ownership
- Owner: Cumulus Media; (Cumulus Licensing LLC)
- Sister stations: WHRP, WUMP, WVNN (AM), WZYP

History
- First air date: October 4, 1992 (as WAZK)
- Former call signs: WAZK (1992–1995); WMHX (3/1995-4/1995); WWXQ (1995–2006)
- Call sign meaning: W Valley's News Network

Technical information
- Licensing authority: FCC
- Facility ID: 25385
- Class: A
- ERP: 3,100 watts
- HAAT: 129 meters (424 feet)
- Transmitter coordinates: 34°42′36″N 87°04′54″W

Links
- Public license information: Public file; LMS
- Webcast: Listen live
- Website: wvnn.com

WVNN-FM (92.5 MHz) is a commercial radio station licensed to Trinity, Alabama. Owned by Cumulus Media, it airs a news/talk radio format. WVNN-FM simulcasts WVNN 770 AM, which is licensed to Athens, Alabama. The stations are branded as "NewsTalk 770 AM/92.5 FM WVNN". The studios and offices are in Athens.

== Broadcast Signal ==
WVNN-AM-FM primarily serve North Alabama, including the Huntsville metropolitan area. They can also be heard in the Florence/Muscle Shoals radio market. WVNN-FM's transmitter is off Nuclear Plant Road in Athens.

== Programming ==
=== News and Talk ===
WVNN-AM-FM features three Alabama-based shows on weekday mornings and afternoons, including "The Dale Jackson Show" (5:00 AM–9:00 AM), "The Yaffee Program" (9:00 AM–11:00 AM) and "Rightside Radio" (2:00 PM–5:00 PM). Nationally syndicated conservative talk shows are heard the rest of the day with Dan Bongino in middays, and at night Mark Levin, Ben Shapiro, Chris Plante and Red Eye Radio.

Weekends feature shows on money, health, religion and the syndicated Kim Komando show on technology, as well as repeats of weekday shows. Most hours begin with news from ABC News Radio.

=== Sports ===
WVNN-AM-FM formerly carried University of Alabama Crimson Tide football and Tennessee Titans football during the fall, and Alabama Vipers arena football games in the spring, as part of a simulcast with sister station, WUMP "SportsRadio 730/103.9, The UMP". Aside from occasional high school football games, or some spillover games from WUMP, WVNN-AM-FM currently offer no sports programming.

== History ==
The 92.5 spot on the FM dial in North Alabama was first the home of WHOS-FM, which signed on in 1951. It was originally licensed to Decatur and was owned by the North Alabama Broadcasting Company, along with AM 800 WHOS. WHOS-FM later moved to 102.1 and today is WDRM, playing country music and usually ranked #1 in the market.

On October 4, 1992, the 92.5 frequency returned to the air with a new broadcast tower and station, WAZK. It was owned by Radio 92, Inc. and aired a classic rock format. The new city of license is Trinity.

In 1994, the station was acquired by Griffith Broadcasting. In March 1995 the station went to a "Mix" adult contemporary format as WMHX. Two months later, in May 1995, the station became WWXQ, as a Top 40 outlet.

In 2000, Capstar Broadcasting acquired WWXQ. Capstar later merged into Clear Channel Communications. Clear Channel simulcast an oldies format on both 94.1 WXQW (now WHRP) and WWXQ. Later, Clear Channel moved that station to 100.3 FM, with the call sign WQRV. Clear Channel is now called iHeartMedia, Inc.

The station changed hands again in April 2006, as part of a two-station deal that also included WXQW. Cumulus Media, the current owner, paid $3.3 million for the two stations. 92.5 became WVNN-FM on April 6, 2006. WVNN-FM began simulcasting the talk programming on 770 WVNN. It primarily serves to improve WVNN's coverage at night. The AM signal must reduce its power to 250 watts at night in order to protect WABC in New York.
