= Kevin Miller (radio host) =

- Born: United States
- Occupation: Talk radio host

Kevin Miller is a conservative American talk radio host and political pundit who has been featured on various national news programs, including The Today Show, Leeza Gibbons, CNN, and MSNBC. Miller has also been featured in The Washington Post and The Baltimore Sun.

After graduating in 1993 with a degree in secondary education from the University of Akron, Miller taught social studies in the Akron public school system.

== Radio experience ==
Miller's first radio job was in Nashua, New Hampshire where he hosted "Miller in the Morning," a frequent stop for presidential candidates during the 1996 campaign. It was here that Pat Buchanan dubbed Miller as "the Pat Buchanan of New Hampshire." He was featured in the first issue of George magazine, founded by John F. Kennedy Jr.

Miller's success in New Hampshire captured the interest of management at Huntsville, Alabama's WVNN, who hired Miller to fill their afternoon slot. From there, Miller went on to WERC in Birmingham, Alabama where he hosted a show and served as program director. In Birmingham, Miller received national media attention for his coverage of the Shirley Henson road rage incident and the 16th Street Baptist Church bombing trials.

From 2003 to 2006, Miller was on the air at WPTF in Raleigh, North Carolina. His morning radio program covered the controversy surrounding the men's lacrosse team at Duke University over in Durham and he was a frequent guest of Headline News' Nancy Grace program early on during the investigative process. Miller has been a frequent guest on Hardball with Chris Matthews and the Nancy Grace Show on Headline News.

Miller later moved “Miller in the Morning” to SuperTalk 99.7 WTN in Nashville, Tennessee, from August 2006 to March 2007. Miller was a host on Pittsburgh's Newsradio 1020 KDKA from 12pm-3pm until January 2009.

In September 2009, Miller's show moved to 580 KIDO in Boise, Idaho where he is the host of the morning show from 5am-9am. In 2014, Miller was named the Medium Market Personality of the Year by the National Association of Broadcasters. While working at KIDO TalkRadio, Miller has taken his show to Iraq to support the deployment of Idaho Army National Guardsmen. He hand delivered over 2,000 handwritten letters from the Treasure Valley to Camp Victory. This was the host’s second trip to the Middle East in support of the troops. Upon returning from Iraq, he walked from Hailey, Idaho to Boise in seven days to raise awareness for veterans.
