= WTKI =

- Huntsville, Alabama; United States
- Broadcast area: Huntsville, Alabama
- Frequency: 1450 kHz
- Branding: Easy 105.3

Programming
- Format: Soft AC

Ownership
- Owner: Mike Brandt; (Southern Broadcasting, LLC)

History
- First air date: November 26, 1946
- Former call signs: WFUN (1946–1960); WFIX (1960–1990); WKGL (1990–1992); WHOH (2002)

Technical information
- Licensing authority: FCC
- Facility ID: 30965
- Class: C
- Power: 1,000 watts
- Transmitter coordinates: 34°43′30″N 86°36′15″W
- Translator: 105.3 W287DH (Huntsville)

Links
- Public license information: Public file; LMS

WTKI (1450 AM, "Easy 105.3") is a radio station licensed to serve Huntsville, Alabama, United States. The station is owned by Mike Brandt, through licensee Southern Broadcasting LLC, doing business as "Easy 105.3". Its studios are located in Madison and transmitter facility located just west of downtown Huntsville.

In November 2009, Focus Radio Communications began operating WTKI under a local marketing agreement, broadcasting a combined news/talk/sports format. Some programming is provided by Fox Sports Radio and Fox Business Network.

In 2010, the station broadcast 85 Southern League baseball games as the flagship station of the Huntsville Stars Radio Network. The network also included then-sister station WIEZ in Decatur, as well as WWIC in Scottsboro. The Stars discontinued play in Huntsville in 2015, moving to Biloxi, Mississippi as the Shuckers. They have since been replaced in the Huntsville market by the Rocket City Trash Pandas, another Southern League team.

== History ==
=== The beginning ===
This station signed on as WFUN on November 26, 1946, and was acquired by the Huntsville Broadcasting Company in May 1948. The station has served Huntsville since under several callsigns: WFUN, WFIX, WKGL, WHOH, and now WTKI.

WFIX in the 1970s was a full-service middle-of-the-road adult contemporary station, until the market upheaval of the 1980s when Arbitron expanded the survey area beyond Madison County and the FM stations began their rise to local market dominance, as was the case elsewhere in the country. Since the mid-1980s, the station has broadcast a number of formats, most notably talk radio, classic country, "relationship radio," and in 2002, it flipped to sports talk as "ESPN 1450". The station was the radio flagship of the Huntsville Stars minor league baseball radio network until the 2007 station ownership and format change. WTKI also broadcast games of the Huntsville Channel Cats of the Central Hockey League from the team's inception in 1995 through the penultimate 1998-1999 season.

=== Switch to WTKI ===
The station was assigned the WTKI call letters by the Federal Communications Commission on September 1, 1992. It has held those call letters since then except for an eight-month period in 2002 when it was a "relationship radio"-formatted, female-oriented talk station under the call sign of WHOH, the "Heart of Huntsville."

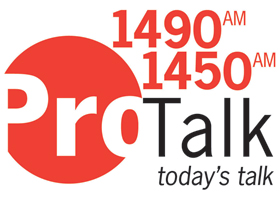
ProTalk logo (2006–2009)

In November 2006, Christian Voice of Central Ohio, Inc., headed by Dan Baughman, agreed to buy WTKI from Mountain Mist Media, LLC., headed by David Barnhardt, for a reported $475,000. As a result, the station flipped formats from sports talk to religious programming in early January 2007. The station, branded as "ProTalk 1450", was operated as a simulcast of sister station WDPT until both ceased operations and went temporarily silent on January 30, 2009, due to the late 2000s recession. Both stations returned to the air in early November 2009 broadcasting a mix of political talk and sports talk programming.

=== WTKI today ===
On December 23, 2009, Christian Voice of Central Ohio Inc. applied to the FCC to transfer the broadcast license for WTKI to FRC of Alabama LLC, doing business as "Focus Radio Communications." As of February 10, 2010, the Commission accepted the application for filing but took no further action. Focus Radio, which has contracted to provide programming for both WTKI and WEKI (the former WDPT) under a local marketing agreement since November 2009, would pay a total of $235,000 for the licenses and assets of both stations.

Focus Radio Communications sold WTKI and translators W243EP and W287DH to Mike Brandt's Southern Broadcasting, LLC effective January 31, 2023 for $700,000.

Mike Brandt has removed the long wire which ran from the studios (which used to carry the broadcasts) and is looking for a new transmitter site in or around Huntsville.
