= Union Grove, Alabama =

- Town
- Nickname: "The Grove"
- Location in Marshall County, Alabama
- Coordinates: 34°24′09″N 86°26′54″W
- Country: United States
- State: Alabama
- County: Marshall

Area
  - Total: 0.57 sq mi (1.47 km^{2})
  - Land: 0.56 sq mi (1.44 km^{2})
  - Water: 0.012 sq mi (0.03 km^{2})
- Elevation: 1,027 ft (313 m)

Population (2020)
  - Total: 67
  - Density: 120.5/sq mi (46.51/km^{2})
- Time zone: UTC-6 (Central (CST))
  - Summer (DST): UTC-5 (CDT)
- ZIP code: 35175
- Area code: 256
- FIPS code: 01-77784
- GNIS feature ID: 2406778

Union Grove is a town in Marshall County, Alabama, United States, and is included in the Huntsville-Decatur Combined Statistical Area. As of the 2020 census, the population of the town was 67, down from 77 at the 2010 census.

In the Civil War the Union troops camped there for some time after passing through Parches Cove. It became known thereafter as Union Grove.

== Geography ==
Union Grove is located in western Marshall County 7 miles (11 km) northeast of Arab and 5 miles (8 km) southwest of Guntersville Dam on the Tennessee River. Union Grove sits at an elevation of 1,027 feet (313 m) above sea level on the relatively flat top of Brindley Mountain, near the southwest end of the Appalachian Plateau.

Electricity service in Union Grove is provided through Arab Electric Cooperative, which comes through the Tennessee Valley Authority.

According to the U.S. Census Bureau, the town has a total area of 0.6 square miles (1.6 km^{2}), of which 0.01 square miles (0.03 km^{2}), or 1.77%, are water.

== Demographics ==
Historical population
| Census | Pop. | Note | %± |
|---|---|---|---|
| 1970 | 118 | | — |
| 1980 | 127 | | 7.6% |
| 1990 | 119 | | −6.3% |
| 2000 | 94 | | −21.0% |
| 2010 | 77 | | −18.1% |
| 2020 | 67 | | −13.0% |
U.S. Decennial Census

As of the census of 2000, there were 94 people, 38 households, and 28 families residing in the town. The population density was 165.5 inhabitants per square mile (63.9/km^{2}). There were 41 housing units at an average density of 72.2 per square mile (27.9/km^{2}). The racial makeup of the town was 97.87% White, 1.06% Native American and 1.06% Asian.

There were 38 households, out of which 31.6% had children under the age of 18 living with them, 60.5% were married couples living together, 7.9% had a female householder with no husband present, and 26.3% were non-families. 21.1% of all households were made up of individuals, and 13.2% had someone living alone who was 65 years of age or older. The average household size was 2.47 and the average family size was 2.89.

In the town, the population was spread out, with 21.3% under the age of 18, 6.4% from 18 to 24, 30.9% from 25 to 44, 22.3% from 45 to 64, and 19.1% who were 65 years of age or older. The median age was 41 years. For every 100 females, there were 108.9 males. For every 100 females age 18 and over, there were 100.0 males.

The median income for a household in the town was $36,250, and the median income for a family was $36,250. Males had a median income of $32,292 versus $19,375 for females. The per capita income for the town was $15,467. There were 15.4% of families and 9.8% of the population living below the poverty line, including no under eighteens and 20.0% of those over 64.

== Education ==
Union Grove is served by the Marshall County Schools. Most of its school age children go to Brindlee Mountain Primary from kindergarten through the 2nd grade, Brindlee Mountain Elementary from the 3rd through the 5th grade, then Brindlee Mountain Middle School from 6th to 8th and the Brindlee Mountain High School from the 9th through 12th grades. The original Primary School was damaged by an EF 2 tornado on January, 11, 2020, and has since been relocated to the High School in Guntersville.
