= WRSA-FM =

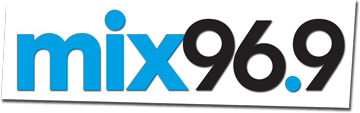
- Holly Pond, Alabama; United States
- Broadcast area: Huntsville metropolitan area; North Alabama
- Frequency: 96.9 MHz
- Branding: Mix 96.9

Programming
- Format: Adult contemporary

Ownership
- Owner: NCA, Inc.

History
- First air date: November 23, 1965
- Call sign meaning: Redstone Arsenal

Technical information
- Licensing authority: FCC
- Facility ID: 47907
- Class: C0
- ERP: 100,000 watts
- HAAT: 308 meters (1,010 ft)
- Transmitter coordinates: 34°29′23″N 86°37′38″W

Links
- Public license information: Public file; LMS
- Webcast: Listen live
- Website: mix969huntsville.com

WRSA-FM (96.9 FM, "Mix 96.9") is a commercial radio station licensed to Holly Pond, Alabama, United States, and serving the Huntsville metropolitan area and North Alabama. It airs an adult contemporary format. It is owned by NCA, Inc., with studios on Memorial Parkway SW (US 231) in Huntsville, a former bank.

The transmitter is off Telephone Tower Road in Union Hill, atop Brindlee Mountain.

== History ==
=== Overview ===
Before a gradual change in the late 1990s away from its longtime "Beautiful 97" image, WRSA-FM was one of the last remaining easy listening stations in the United States. It was founded and constructed in 1964 and early 1965 by Redstone Arsenal engineer Paul R. Nielsen. (The call letters refer to the Redstone Arsenal, a large U.S. Army base near Huntsville.) WRSA signed on the air on November 23, 1965. Its studios were originally in Decatur.

=== Beautiful 97 (1965–2001) ===
WRSA started off as "Beautiful 97," airing an easy listening format for some 36 years. It continued the genre long after it had disappeared from most U.S. radio markets by the 1980s. During the 1970s, the station was the local home of the weekly Saturday-afternoon broadcasts of the Metropolitan Opera, sponsored by Texaco. By the 1980s, that program moved to WNDA (now WRTT-FM).

WRSA played quarter hour sweeps of soft, mostly instrumental music with limited commercials and chatter. It advertised that it "served Northern Alabama from studios overlooking the beautiful Tennessee Valley."

=== Lite 96.9 (2001–2015) ===
While other stations had moved on from easy listening by the 1980s and 90s, WRSA continued to play a mix of instrumentals and soft vocals into the new century. It briefly called itself "Alabama's Big Easyl" But in 2001, the instrumentals were removed from the playlist. WRSA had made change to soft adult contemporary. It was rebranded as "Lite 96.9".

The soft AC sound continued for 14 years. The last song played on "Lite 96.9" was "I Will Remember You" by Sarah McLachlan. At that point, the tempo was picked up.

=== Mix 96.9 (2015–present) ===
On January 11, 2015, the station flipped to a mainstream adult contemporary sound, under the branding "Mix 96.9" and the slogan "The best variety of the 80s, 90s, & more!". The first song played on "Mix 96.9" was "Hit Me With Your Best Shot" By Pat Benatar. WRSA primarily plays AC songs from the 1980s through the present. Every year from November to December, "Mix 96.9" plays Christmas music until December 26.

== Personalities ==
Notable local on-air personalities on WRSA-FM include Abby Kay and Bill Taylor in morning drive time. Other DJs include midday host Stuart Langston and afternoon host Paul Tranquillo (Paul T).

Previous personalities since the "Mix 96.9" rebrand included Blair Davis, Jerome "Fish" Fisher, Bonny O'Brien, and traffic reporter Allen Moore.
