= WVNN (AM) =

- Athens, Alabama; United States
- Broadcast area: Huntsville metropolitan area
- Frequency: 770 kHz
- Branding: NewsTalk 770 AM/92.5 FM WVNN

Programming
- Format: News/talk
- Network: ABC News Radio
- Affiliations: Westwood One; Premiere Networks

Ownership
- Owner: Cumulus Media; (Cumulus Licensing LLC)
- Sister stations: WHRP, WUMP, WVNN-FM, WZYP

History
- First air date: 1948 (as WJMW at 1010)
- Former call signs: WJMW (1948–1988)
- Former frequencies: 1010 kHz (1948–1953); 730 kHz (1953–1984)
- Call sign meaning: W The Valley's News Network

Technical information
- Licensing authority: FCC
- Facility ID: 3084
- Class: D
- Power: 7,000 watts days only
- Transmitter coordinates: 34°45′2″N 86°47′58″W

Links
- Public license information: Public file; LMS
- Webcast: Listen live
- Website: wvnn.com

WVNN (770 kHz) is a commercial AM radio station licensed to Athens, Alabama, serving parts of North Alabama including Huntsville and Decatur. Owned by Cumulus Media, it airs a news/talk format. Programming on WVNN is simulcast on WVNN-FM 92.5 MHz, which is licensed to Trinity, Alabama. Collectively, the stations are branded as "NewsTalk 770 AM/92.5 FM WVNN." The studios and offices are on U.S. Route 72 East in Athens.

WVNN is a daytimer station, broadcasting with 7,000 watts non-directional, with its transmitter located off Lee Highway (U.S. Route 72) in Huntsville. Because AM 770 is a clear channel frequency reserved for 50,000-watt Class A WABC in New York City, WVNN must go off the air at night to avoid interference. It abandoned its limited night signal in 2020 and operates days only with pre-sunrise and post-sunset authorization (PSSA).

== Programming ==
=== News and Talk ===
WVNN-AM-FM feature Alabama-based shows on weekdays, including The Dale Jackson Show. Nationally syndicated conservative talk shows are heard the rest of the day with Dan Bongino in middays, and at night Mark Levin, Ben Shapiro, Chris Plante and Red Eye Radio.

Weekends feature shows on money, health, religion and the syndicated Kim Komando show on technology, as well as repeats of weekday shows. Most hours begin with an update from ABC News Radio.

=== Sports ===
WVNN-AM-FM formerly carried University of Alabama Crimson Tide football and Tennessee Titans football during the fall, and Alabama Vipers arena football games in the spring, as part of a simulcast with sister station, WUMP "SportsRadio 730/103.9, The UMP". Aside from occasional high school football games, or some spillover games from WUMP, WVNN-AM-FM currently offer no sports programming.

== History ==
=== WJMW and WKSR ===
WVNN is descended from two radio stations; one is WJMW, a daytimer that first signed on in 1948. WJMW's frequency was 1010 kHz. It transmitted with 250 watts and was required to go off the air at sunset. It was owned by the Athens Broadcasting Company, founded by Homer Felix "Pap" Dunnavant.

The other station was also a daytimer; WKSR went on the air in 1947, on 730 AM in Pulaski, Tennessee, a town about 30 miles north of Athens. It was owned by the Pulaski Broadcasting Company and was a Mutual Broadcasting System network affiliate.

=== Move to 730 and to 770 ===
In 1953, the Athens Broadcasting Company acquired the license for WJMW and got permission from the Federal Communications Commission (FCC) to move it to Athens, putting WJMW on the lower frequency (this would give the station greater range, since lower frequencies travel farther), & the power was increased to 500 watts. It remained a daytimer, because 730 kHz is a Mexican clear channel frequency. At the same time, WKSR moved to 1420 kHz, also in Pulaski, Tennessee.

The station made another move on the dial in the early 1980s, from 730 to 770 kHz. While WJMW had to now protect WABC in New York, it was more than 800 miles away. That was far enough for the FCC to allow the station to operate around the clock, with reduced power at night. The station switched its call sign to WVNN on September 26, 1988. It changed to a news/talk format, using news from ABC News Radio and talk shows from the ABC TalkRadio Network.

=== Cumulus ownership ===
WJMW was owned and operated by the Dunnavant family of Athens for 55 years prior to being sold to Cumulus Media as part of a four-station deal in 2003. The sale ended a 55-year presence in the market for Athens Broadcasting, founded in 1948 by Pap Dunnavant.

Cumulus also acquired several other Huntsville-area stations, WHRP, WUMP, WVNN-FM, WWFF-FM and WZYP.

=== Past programming ===
Notable former WVNN air personalities include George Rose who, along with his alter-ego "Cousin Josh" character, hosted The Cousin Josh Jamboree on several North Alabama radio stations in a career that began in 1948 at then-WJMW and ended at WKAC with his death in 2006.

Several well-known talk radio hosts spent early portions of their careers at WVNN, including Sean Hannity, Peter Thiele, Kevin Miller, Keith Larson, Darla Jaye, and Mike Church. Will Anderson hosted a show on WVNN until August 2007, then returned a few years later. Tim Knox hosted a show on WVNN until December 2007.
