= WDJL =

Huntsville, Alabama; United States
- Broadcast area: Huntsville-Athens-Decatur
- Frequency: 1000 kHz
- Branding: WDJL Gospel Explosions 1000 AM

Programming
- Format: Urban gospel with Christian talk and teaching

Ownership
- Owner: WDJL Gospel Explosions; (Dorothy Sandifer)

History
- First air date: October 1, 1968
- Former call signs: WVOV (1968–1981); WTAK (1981–1994)

Technical information
- Licensing authority: FCC
- Facility ID: 23088
- Class: D
- Power: 1,100 watts (days only)
- Transmitter coordinates: 34°46′47″N 86°39′16″W

Links
- Public license information: Public file; LMS
- Webcast: Listen live
- Website: wdjl1000am.net

WDJL (1000 AM, "Gospel Explosions") is a commercial radio station licensed to Huntsville, Alabama, United States, that serves the Huntsville-Athens-Decatur market during the daytime hours only. Owned by Dorothy Sandifer, doing business as WDJL Gospel Explosions, it broadcasts an urban gospel format with Christian talk and teaching shows. WDJL's transmitter and studios are on Stringfield Road NW near Blake Bottom Road in Huntsville.

== History ==
The station signed on the air on October 1, 1968. It was powered at 10,000 watts but was always a daytime only operation. It had a Top 40 format as WVOV. The call sign stood for the "Voice of the Valley." In 1979, the station flipped to a country music format before falling temporarily silent.

WTAK logo

In May 1981 the station returned as WTAK. It was branded as "The New WTAK 10 AM", with an Adult Contemporary music format and a morning team of Mike Sweeney and Gary Drake. Limited by the daytime-only restrictions, the station went through several owners. Formats included Oldies, Jazz Fusion and a mix of album rock and classic rock.

In 1987, the station changed to a fulltime AOR format which it later shared with then-sister station 106.1 WTAK-FM. After a transition period to establish the FM home of the format, and an April 1994 call sign change to WDJL, the AM station was sold off in 1995.

In October 1996, local insurance and real estate broker Keith Sharp acquired the station as part of a land deal. The station flipped to an oldies music format under the moniker "Gold 1000".

The station ran 10,000 watts of power in a directional pattern until 2006 when its towers and the land on which they were located were sold off. The station relocated to a single tower and a smaller lot size.

Former logo

The station was purchased by Dorothy Sandifer in 2008. The branding of the station was changed to "WDJL, Gospel Explosions, 1000 AM."
