= WTAK-FM =

- Hartselle, Alabama; United States
- Broadcast area: Huntsville, Alabama
- Frequency: 106.1 MHz (HD Radio)
- Branding: 106.1 WTAK

Programming
- Format: Classic rock
- Affiliations: Premiere Networks

Ownership
- Owner: iHeartMedia, Inc.; (iHM Licenses, LLC)
- Sister stations: WDRM; WBHP; WQRV

History
- First air date: 1991
- Former call signs: WYAM (1991–1993)

Technical information
- Licensing authority: FCC
- Facility ID: 25383
- Class: C3
- ERP: 5,400 watts
- HAAT: 221 meters (725 ft)
- Transmitter coordinates: 34°27′45.3″N 86°38′35.9″W

Links
- Public license information: Public file; LMS
- Webcast: Listen live (via iHeartRadio)
- Website: wtak.iheart.com

WTAK-FM (106.1 MHz) is a classic rock-formatted radio station licensed to Hartselle, Alabama, and owned by San Antonio–based iHeartMedia, Inc. It serves Huntsville, Alabama, and the central Tennessee Valley area. Its broadcast tower is located on Brindlee Mountain in Morgan County, Alabama, near the Union Hill community, and its studios are located on Peoples Road near Interstate 565 in Madison, Alabama.

In the 2000s, WTAK-FM was one of the top-rated radio stations in the Huntsville market.

== Personalities ==
The on-air staff currently consists of "Deano", Johnny Maze, and "BigRig", who appear each weekday. The station's morning show is the syndicated The John Boy and Billy Big Show.

== Programming ==
In addition to its regular music programming, WTAK-FM also carries The House of Hair with Dee Snider on Saturday nights. On Sunday mornings, Flashback, hosted by Matt Pinfield, airs.

== History ==
WTAK-FM was originally known by the call sign WYAM and went on the air around November 1991. WTAK (1000 AM, now WDJL) shifted its programming solely to the 106.1 FM signal in late 1993 after several months of simulcast. This station was assigned the WTAK-FM call letters by the Federal Communications Commission on July 6, 1993.
