= WAFN (AM) =

Simulcast of WAFN-FM Arab
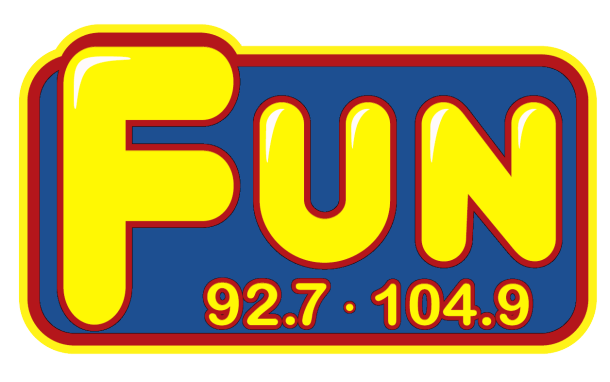
- Priceville, Alabama; United States
- Broadcast area: Huntsville, Alabama
- Frequency: 1310 kHz
- Branding: Fun Radio

Programming
- Format: Classic hits
- Affiliations: United Stations Radio Networks

Ownership
- Owner: Steve Sudbury and Louis Anzek; (Fun Radio Group of North Alabama, LLC)
- Sister stations: WAFN-FM

History
- First air date: December 2, 1986 (as WJRA)
- Former call signs: WJRA (1984–2001); WQAH (2001–2009); WKZD (2009–2021)

Technical information
- Licensing authority: FCC
- Facility ID: 290
- Class: D
- Power: 1,000 watts day; 33 watts night
- Transmitter coordinates: 34°32′32″N 86°54′14″W
- Translator: See § Translator

Links
- Public license information: Public file; LMS
- Webcast: Listen live
- Website: www.fun927.com

WAFN (1310 kHz) is a commercial AM radio station licensed to Priceville, Alabama, that serves Decatur and the western portion of the Huntsville radio market. The station is owned by Fun Radio Group of North Alabama, LLC, along with WAFN-FM 92.7 in Arab, Alabama. WAFN and WAFN-FM simulcast a classic hits radio format.

By day, WAFN broadcasts at 1,000 watts. To protect other stations on 1310 AM from interference, at night it reduces power to 33 watts. Programming is also heard on FM translator W285EN at 104.9 MHz.

== History ==
This station was granted its original construction permit by the Federal Communications Commission on December 19, 1983. The station was assigned the call letters WJRA from February 1984 until September 7, 2001, when it was assigned WQAH by the FCC. WJRA received its license to cover on December 2, 1986.

The station was assigned the call sign WKZD on February 2, 2009.

Effective October 31, 2021, Somerville Baptist Church sold WKZD and translator W285EN to Fun Radio Group of North Alabama for $85,000. Fun Radio changed the call sign to WAFN on November 10, 2021, simulcasting a classic hits format with co-owned WAFN-FM 92.7.

== Translator ==
WAFN also broadcasts on the following FM translator:

Broadcast translator for WAFN
Call sign	Frequency	City of license	FID	ERP (W)	FCC info
W285EN	104.9 FM	Priceville, Alabama	24898	250	LMS
