= Union Hill, Alabama =

- Unincorporated community
- Location within Alabama Location within the United States
- Coordinates: 34°28′25″N 86°37′19″W
- Country: United States
- State: Alabama
- County: Morgan
- Elevation: 1,270 ft (387 m)
- Time zone: UTC-6 (Central (CST))
  - Summer (DST): UTC-5 (CDT)
- Area code: 256

Union Hill, also known as Wolff, is an unincorporated community in the eastern portion of Morgan County, Alabama, United States. It is one of the highest points on Brindlee Mountain, part of the Appalachian Mountains. The area consists of Union Hill School (a K-8 school), Union Hill Senior Center and New Canaan Baptist Church. It also hosts Station #2 of the Brindlee Mountain Fire Department, as well as Lecroy's, a popular restaurant up the road from the school. The broadcast tower for radio station WRSA Lite 96.9 is also located in Union Hill. A post office operated under the name Wolff from 1899 to 1905.
