= WYAM-LD =

Television station in Priceville, Alabama

- Priceville–Decatur, Alabama; United States
- City: Priceville, Alabama
- Channels: Digital: 28 (UHF); Virtual: 51
- Branding: WYAM TV51

Programming
- Affiliations: 51.1: Independent; 51.2: Unknown; 51.3: Audio of WYAM (890 AM)

Ownership
- Owner: Signal Mountain Broadcasting, LLC
- Sister stations: WYAM

History
- Founded: 1994
- First air date: 1996
- Former call signs: W56DE (1994–1996); WYAM-LP (1996–2010)
- Former channel numbers: Analog: 56, 51 (UHF); Digital: 51 (UHF, 2010–2013); 15 (UHF, 2013–2020)

Technical information
- Licensing authority: FCC
- Facility ID: 17351
- Class: LD
- ERP: 12.2 kW
- HAAT: 57.2 m (188 ft)
- Transmitter coordinates: 34°34′0″N 86°54′46″W

Links
- Public license information: LMS

WYAM-LD (channel 51) is a low-power television station licensed to Priceville, Alabama, United States, serving the Decatur area. Owned by Signal Mountain Broadcasting, LLC, it is sister to WYAM (890 AM), a Spanish-language radio station in the area. The two outlets share studios on Central Parkway on Decatur's south side; WYAM-LD's transmitter is located on Deere Road southeast of the city.

== History ==
The station started on channel 56 in 1996. In 2000, the Wiley family purchased the station; it was added to the local Charter cable system, increasing its reach and making it available to cable households for the first time. Two years later, the station began broadcasting Decatur city council and Morgan County Commission meetings, which it continued to do through 2016. It also aired high school sports and a local talk show, Valley Happenings; the station had seven live programs, including one in Spanish, by 2004.

In 2022, the Wileys announced their intention to retire after selling WYAM radio and television, which were listed for $3.4 million. The stations were sold to Pelham, Alabama–based Signal Mountain Broadcasting in a deal that was completed on January 7, 2026.

== Subchannels ==
The station's signal is multiplexed:

Subchannels of WYAM-LD
Subchannel	Res.	Short name	Programming
51.1	720p	WYAM 51	Main WYAM-LD programming
51.2	480i		Unknown (Note: Formerly broadcast Azteca América, which folded on December 31, 2022.)
51.3	480i	WYAM 89	Audio of WYAM (890 AM)
