= WIEZ (AM) =

- Decatur, Alabama; United States
- Broadcast area: Huntsville metropolitan area
- Frequency: 1490 kHz
- Branding: 94.7 La Raza

Programming
- Language: Spanish
- Format: Regional Mexican

Ownership
- Owner: MKRadio1, LLC

History
- First air date: 1953 (as WAJF)
- Former call signs: WAJF (1953–2006); WDPT (2006–2009); WEKI (2009–2018)

Technical information
- Licensing authority: FCC
- Facility ID: 70707
- Class: C
- Power: 1,000 watts (unlimited)
- Translator: 94.7 W234DN (Decatur)
- Repeater: 890 WYAM (Hartselle)

Links
- Public license information: Public file; LMS
- Webcast: Listen live
- Website: 947laraza.com

WIEZ (1490 kHz) is an AM radio station licensed to Decatur, Alabama that serves the western Huntsville, Alabama, market. The station airs a Regional Mexican format.

WIEZ carries Austin High School football on Friday evenings during the fall.

== History ==
During the early 1960s to the early 1990s, WAJF was the call sign and the format was mostly Top 40. Its main competition during much of that time was WMSL (now WWTM), also in Decatur. There were several local legends that worked there, including Hamilton Masters, George "The Cardboard" Carden, "Bill and Dave", Thom Collins, and others. WAJF also carried the CBS Radio Mystery Theater each weeknight at midnight during the 1970s. With FM radio becoming more and more popular, AM stations began to suffer. The local talent moved on and advertising got virtually impossible to sell. Eventually, the station had only a handful of faithful sponsors, but not enough to maintain solvent operations.

Before switching to the current call sign, this station was known as WAJF. The station was assigned the WDPT call letters by the Federal Communications Commission on November 20, 2006. The 1490 frequency was re-allocated to Decatur after then-WHBS (later WAAY and WAAJ, Now WLOR)/Huntsville moved from to 1550 kHz in 1952.

In December 2002, the then-WAJF was sold to WAJF Inc. (Ira Littman, president) by Daniel L. Oppenheim for $150,000.

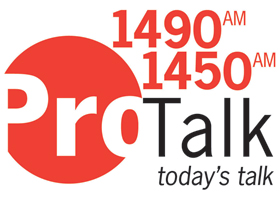
ProTalk logo (2007–2009)

In June 2007, WDPT was sold to Christian Voice of Central Ohio Inc. by WAJF Inc. (Troy Bryant, president) for a reported sale price of $167,500. The station, branded as "ProTalk 1490", was operated as a simulcast of sister station WTKI in Huntsville until both ceased operations and went temporarily silent on January 30, 2009, due to the late 2000s recession. Both stations returned to the air in November 2009 broadcasting a mix of talk radio and sports talk programming. The station's callsign was changed to WEKI on November 19, 2009, to better match its simulcast partner.

On December 23, 2009, Christian Voice of Central Ohio Inc. applied to the FCC to transfer the broadcast license for WEKI to FRC of Alabama LLC, doing business as "Focus Radio Communications" (Frederick Holland, managing member). The Commission approved this application on February 16, 2010, and the transaction was consummated April 30, 2010. Focus Radio, which provided programming for both WEKI and WTKI under a local marketing agreement from November 2009, paid a total of $235,000 for the licenses and assets of both stations. Upon commencement of the local marketing agreement with Focus Radio, WEKI was originally a simulcast of sister WTKI in Huntsville.

Also in 2009, WEKI began broadcasting on FM translator W234AD, Decatur, at 94.7 FM.

In 2010, WEKI broadcast at least 85 Southern League baseball games as a member of the Huntsville Stars Radio Network. The network also included sister station WTKI and WWIC in Scottsboro. The Stars discontinued play in 2015, when the team moved to Biloxi, Mississippi.

In 2011, WEKI separated from the WTKI simulcast, focusing on Decatur and the western part of the metro area - although the two stations carried much of the same programming throughout the week.

On March 8, 2018, WEKI changed its format from talk to oldies, branded as "94.7 Oldies Radio" under new WIEZ calls. Veteran DC programmer Chris Roth became the Program Director.

On March 4, 2019, an application was filed with the FCC to transfer ownership of WIEZ and the 94.7 translator (now W234DN) to MKRadio1, LLC (Joshua Bohn, managing member) for $131,500. Ownership transferred from Focus Radio to MKRadio1 on July 1, 2019. Accuweather forecasts and ABC News were added in October. The format shifted from oldies to soft oldies on October 25, 2019.

At 9:47 am on September 13, 2021, WIEZ began stunting with a loop of Tone Lōc's early 1989 rap hit "Wild Thing". At 5:15 pm on September 16, the station debuted a 1980s–1990s dance music format. The oldies format continues to air on WIEZ's website.

On September 24, 2021, WIEZ rebranded as "Wild 94.7".

On September 22, 2025, WIEZ changed their format from rhythmic contemporary to Regional Mexican, branded as "94.7 La Raza".

== Previous logos ==
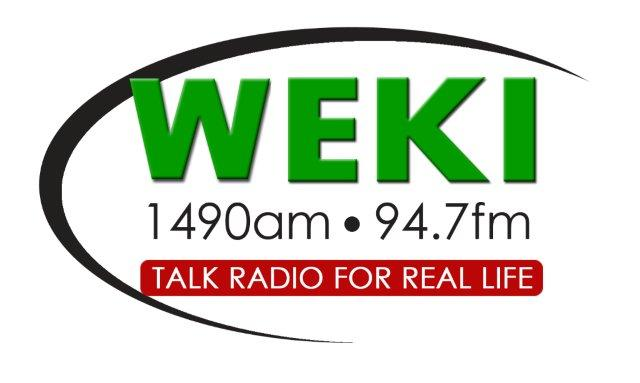
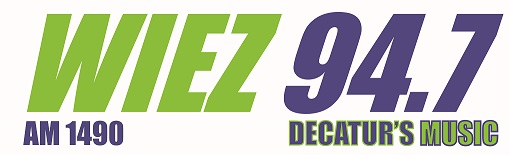
