= WKAC =

Athens, Alabama; United States
- Broadcast area: Huntsville, Alabama
- Frequency: 1080 kHz
- Branding: The Big 1080

Programming
- Format: Oldies, Classic hits, and Talk

Ownership
- Owner: Limestone Broadcasting Company, Inc.

History
- First air date: 1964
- Call sign meaning: We Keep Athens Connected

Technical information
- Licensing authority: FCC
- Facility ID: 37505
- Class: D
- Power: 5,000 watts (day); 2,500 watts (critical hours)
- Transmitter coordinates: 34°50′13″N 86°58′28″W

Links
- Public license information: Public file; LMS
- Webcast: Listen Live
- Website: wkac1080.com

WKAC (1080 AM, "The Big 1080") is a radio station in Athens, Alabama, United States, broadcasting on the 1080 kHz frequency. The station is owned by Limestone Broadcasting Company, Inc. It primarily serves the Huntsville, Alabama, market.

== Programming ==
The station plays a mix of local programming and classic hits. Weekday programming includes "Morning Drive with Ken Fox," "Sick Call" hosted by Jay Hudson, "The Classifieds," late mornings with "The Morning Show with Ken and Kirk," middays with Tim Lambert's "Goodtime Gold Midday Show," and afternoons with Kirk Harvey. "Sick Call" is a daily program that announces recent deaths and people in the hospital, a common practice among old-line small-town Southern radio stations; the show first aired in 1953 on WJMW. "The Classifieds," formerly known as "Swap 'n' Shop," is a live call-in tradio show for listing items or services for sale, another Southern radio tradition. The music is an oldies format, which airs throughout the broadcast day. Because of regulations imposed by the Federal Communications Commission to protect WKAC from interfering with signals from nighttime "clear channel" stations elsewhere in the country, WKAC is required to sign off before sunset.

Weekend programming includes a mix of music and local shows. Notable weekend shows include "Applebee's Tailgate Talk" on Saturday mornings. WKAC began internet streaming in 2011, which enables the station to continue programming in the evening and overnight hours after the terrestrial signal has to be turned off for the day.

In 2012, the station began to air Athens High School football on wkac1080.com with play-by-play announcer Greg Young alongside color commentator Coach Jerry Davis. Athens High School basketball games are also carried on wkac1080.com with play-by-play announcer Cale Abernathy and color commentator Coach Ron Oakley.

Fridays at 10 p.m. CT, the station carries on its streaming service the weekly syndicated Pink Floyd program "Floydian Slip."

== History ==
Notable former on-air personalities include George Rose who, along with his alter-ego "Cousin Josh" character, hosted "The Cousin Josh Jamboree" on several North Alabama radio stations in a career that began in 1948 at then-WJMW and ended at WKAC with his death in 2006. Popular Birmingham on-air personality Coyote J Calhoun was program director at WKAC for a short period in late 1972, working under the air name Jackson (Jack) Richards. The station broadcast blocks of Spanish-language programming from 2001 to 2012, reflecting significant immigration from Latin American countries to Limestone County during that period.
