= WHRP =

- Gurley, Alabama; United States
- Broadcast area: Huntsville, Alabama
- Frequency: 94.1 MHz
- Branding: 94.1 WHRP

Programming
- Format: Urban adult contemporary

Ownership
- Owner: Cumulus Media; (Cumulus Licensing LLC)
- Sister stations: WUMP, WVNN, WVNN-FM, WZYP

History
- First air date: 1996 (as WXQW)
- Former call signs: WDJU (3/1995-11/1995); WXQW (1995–2007)

Technical information
- Licensing authority: FCC
- Facility ID: 22264
- Class: A
- ERP: 710 watts
- HAAT: 288 meters (946 feet)
- Transmitter coordinates: 34°40′50″N 86°30′55″W

Links
- Public license information: Public file; LMS
- Webcast: Listen live
- Website: whrpfm.com

WHRP (94.1 FM) is a radio station licensed to serve Gurley, Alabama, United States. The station is owned by Cumulus Media and the license is held by Cumulus Licensing LLC. WHRP broadcasts an urban adult contemporary music format to the Huntsville, Alabama, market. Its transmitter is located southeast of downtown Huntsville, but its main studios are in Athens, Alabama.

== Programming ==
Notable personalities on WHRP include local weekday hosts Toni Terrell with the "At Work Network" mid-days, Big O (a.k.a. The Mayor of Soul) Saturday mornings with Classic Soul on "The Time Tunnel", and Huntsville radio veteran Kevin "The Nighthawk" Williams weekends. Notable syndicated hosts include Tom Joyner of The Tom Joyner Morning Show, Michael Baisden of The Michael Baisden Show and Keith Sweat of The Keith Sweat Hotel.

Notable former on-air personnel include Bobby Wonder, Nia Noelle and Ronnie Rio.

Former WXQW mid-day host Chuck Boozer, apparently local, was actually the evening host at WWMG-FM in Charlotte, North Carolina. Boozer recorded his WXQW air shift in about forty minutes on a computer in Charlotte as digital voice tracks for later playback on the air in Huntsville. This use of "voice tracking" is a practice common to many Clear Channel-owned radio stations, as then-WXQW was at that time.

== History ==
This station received its original construction permit from the Federal Communications Commission on January 19, 1995. The new station was assigned the call letters WDJU by the FCC on March 14, 1995.

In June 1995, control of permit holder Digesu Broadcasting, Inc., was transferred from Frank Digesu Sr. to R. Parker Griffith and Thomas H. Griffith. The transfer was approved by the FCC on August 9, 1995. In October 1995, Digesu Broadcasting, Inc., reached an agreement to sell this station to Griffith Broadcasting, Inc. The deal was approved by the FCC on November 30, 1995, and the transaction was consummated on the same day. The new owners had the FCC change the callsign for the station, still under construction, to WXQW on November 10, 1995.

WXQW received its license to cover from the FCC on June 3, 1996.

In June 1997, Griffith Broadcasting, Inc., reached an agreement to sell this station to Southern Star Communications, Inc. The deal was approved by the FCC on August 8, 1997, and the transaction was consummated on October 2, 1997. Southern Star Communications is a regional operating company of Capstar Broadcasting Corporation. On October 1, 1997, the station flipped formats from adult contemporary to oldies music.

In December 2005, Cumulus Media purchased this station (then known as WXQW) and sister station WWXQ (now WVNN) from the Capstar TX Limited Partnership division of Clear Channel Communications for a reported $3.3 million. On December 21, 2007, WXQW switched to the WHRP call letters of its sister station and that former WHRP was assigned new call letters WWFF-FM.

Several other unrelated stations have held the WHRP call letters over the years, including the current WQKR (1270 AM, Portland, Tennessee) which was known as WHRP from 1986 to 1990 and WRJR (670 AM, Claremont, Virginia) which was known as WHRP from 2000 to 2001.
