= WWIC =

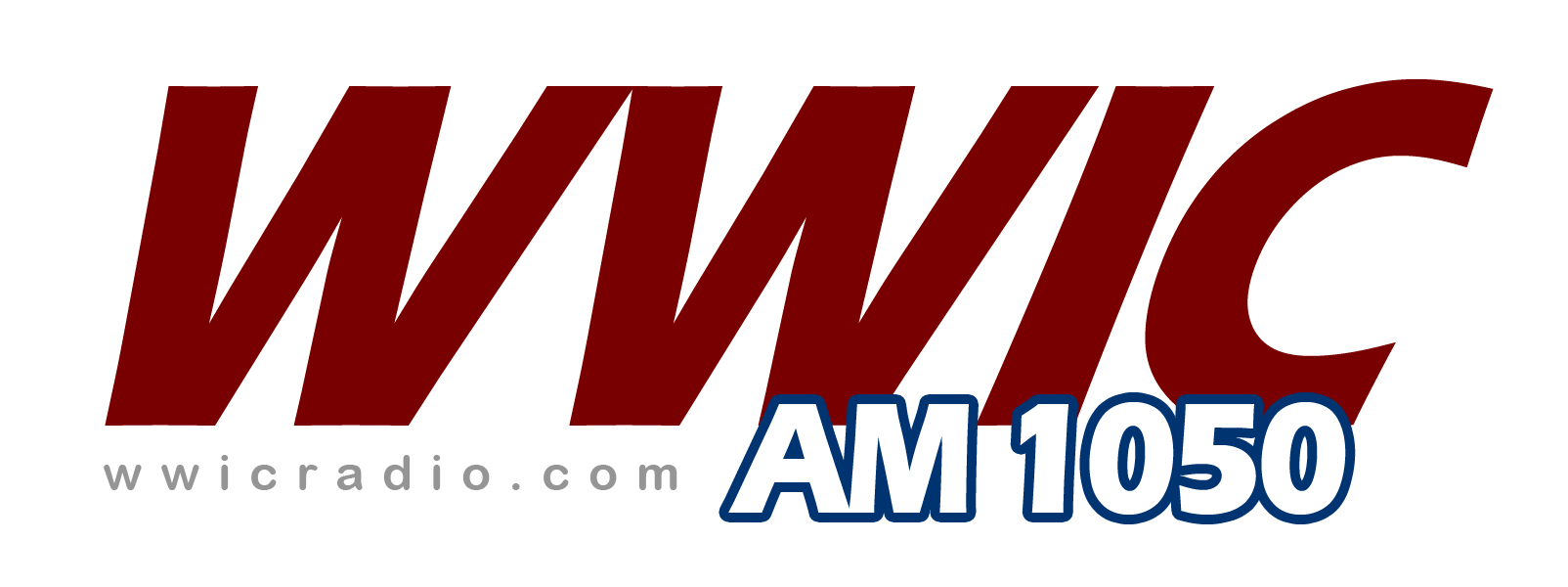
- Scottsboro, Alabama; United States
- Frequency: 1050 kHz
- Branding: 1050 WWIC

Programming
- Format: Classic country

Ownership
- Owner: Scottsboro Broadcasting Co.

History
- First air date: June 13, 1950
- Former call signs: WCRI (1950–1982)

Technical information
- Licensing authority: FCC
- Facility ID: 59421
- Class: D
- Power: 1,000 watts (day); 100 watts (night)
- Transmitter coordinates: 34°40′23″N 86°03′11″W
- Translator: 104.5 W283CM (Henagar)

Links
- Public license information: Public file; LMS
- Webcast: Listen live
- Website: wwicradio.com

WWIC (1050 AM, "Real Country 1050") is a radio station licensed to serve Scottsboro, Alabama. The station, established in 1950, is owned by Scottsboro Broadcasting Co.

== Formatting ==
WWIC airs a classic country music format featuring the "Real Country" satellite-delivered format from ABC Radio.

As of 2021, WWIC carries the following:

- MRN Radio Network
- Alabama Crimson Tide sports RollTide.com
- Tennessee Titans football
- Paul Finebaum's sports talk show
- Nashville Predators hockey
- CBS Sports Radio
- Slap Shot Radio
- Mike Huckabee's political commentary
- CBS News
- Atlanta Braves Radio Network (baseball)
- WWIC owner Greg Bell provides play-by-play coverage of Scottsboro High School Wildcats football and basketball.

The station streams via the internet and also has an app devoted to local weather coverage.

== History ==
The station was founded in 1950 as a 250-watt station broadcasting on 1050 kHz as WCRI, under the ownership of Pat M. Courington. The station was assigned the WWIC call sign by the Federal Communications Commission on February 4, 1982.

When the call sign was changed, it stood for the phrase "We Worship In Christ", to promote the gospel format that aired at the time.
