= WDRM =

Radio station in Decatur, Alabama

- Decatur, Alabama; United States
- Broadcast area: Huntsville, Alabama
- Frequency: 102.1 MHz (HD Radio)
- Branding: 102.1 WDRM

Programming
- Format: Country
- Subchannels: HD2: Simulcast of WHOS; HD3: WayFM Network
- Affiliations: Premiere Networks

Ownership
- Owner: iHeartMedia; (iHM Licenses, LLC)
- Sister stations: WBHP; WQRV; WTAK-FM

History
- First air date: 1951
- Former call signs: WHOS-FM (1951–1966); WDRM (1966–1982); WDRM-FM (1982–1986)
- Former frequencies: 92.5 MHz (1951–1959)
- Call sign meaning: Decatur Radio Market

Technical information
- Licensing authority: FCC
- Facility ID: 44024
- Class: C1
- ERP: 100,000 watts
- HAAT: 299 meters (981 ft)
- Transmitter coordinates: 34°47′36.3″N 86°37′51″W
- Translators: HD2: 102.5 W273CX (Huntsville); HD3: 99.5 W258AU (Chase)

Links
- Public license information: Public file; LMS
- Webcast: Listen live (via iHeartRadio)
- Website: wdrm.iheart.com

WDRM (102.1 FM) is an American radio station licensed to serve the community of Decatur, Alabama, and owned by San Antonio-based iHeartMedia. It serves the Huntsville, Alabama, area with a country music format. Its studios are located on Peoples Road near Interstate 565 in Madison, Alabama and its transmitter is located north of Huntsville.

WDRM has been consistently ranked by Arbitron as the most-listened to radio station in the Huntsville market for two decades. The weekday morning show, currently hosted by Brent "Dingo" Crank and Blair Maples, was top-rated in the Huntsville market for two decades until falling to #2 in the Summer 2008 ratings.

Except for a short period from 1982 to 1986 when it was officially "WDRM-FM" to accommodate a co-owned AM station being branded as "WDRM", this station has been assigned the WDRM call letters by the Federal Communications Commission since March 18, 1966.

WDRM simulcasts the audio of Huntsville-based television station WHNT-TV when severe weather threatens its listening area.

== History ==
WHOS-FM started in 1951 on 92.5 FM as a simulcast of WHOS (800 kHz), but aired 24 hours a day, unlike WHOS, which could only air in the daytime due to Federal Communications Commission restrictions to protect several U.S. stations that aired a nighttime "clear channel" signal on 800 AM. The station was later moved to 102.1 MHz in 1959.

WDRM was automated without live disc jockeys until the late 1960s. In 1967, WDRM began a popular evening program called "Nite Country" which featured a live DJ and phone-in requests. The first DJ on Nite Country was Tony Beason (1967–69). He was replaced in 1969 by Wayne Forsythe, whose program aired until 1971.

In the late 1970s and early 1980s, WDRM played a Top 40 and Album rock format; the station employed a youthful stable of on-air personalities during this era. Barry "The Nightcrawler" Cole, Doug "More Music" Micheals, and Thom Collins were a few of the disc jockeys on the station during that period. Comedic comments and an on-air attitude of "not following the rules" were very popular with younger listeners, most of whom had never heard hard rock on the radio before. The nearest stations to Decatur that played a hard rock format were in Birmingham, and they were very difficult to receive except on external FM antennas.

This type of broadcasting, however, was not conducive to selling advertising in a predominantly religious and conservative part of the country (and with relatively few affluent teenagers and young adults) like northern Alabama, and the station suffered financially as a result. This was because few businesses wanted anything to do with what some of them considered "sinful" programming.

For a brief time in the early 1980s, WDRM made another attempt at a country format, with little success due to the numerous AM outlets serving the Tennessee Valley at the time with that type of music, some of whom had played country for decades (one of those was WDRM's AM sister station, WHOS).

After that failure, WDRM decided to return to pop and rock in 1982, adopting what was then known as an "urban contemporary" sound. The station used the branding "Jam 102" and played a mix of Top 40, album rock, and urban. Major Logan was the program director at this time, creating the format and name. The station was beginning to attract attention and turn around after a long period of being unprofitable for the owner. On-air personalities during this period included Major Logan, Bill "BS In the Morning" Simon, Gary "Madman" Mattox, David "The Suntan Superman" Player and "Sir Charles". The main sales market at that time was limited to Decatur and had not branched out to the Huntsville area. Unfortunately, Decatur was not ready for that format, which proved more controversial than even the late 1970s rock era; much of that probably had to do with the station's obvious attempts to attract a biracial audience, something still distasteful to many local whites years after desegregation. As such, the jockeys got continuous anonymous threats and local "bad press".

After much discussion of the station's community relations problem, consideration of the rising popularity of mainstream country music among younger listeners, and falling ratings against market leader WZYP, station management decided to try a country format again in 1984, this time with an emphasis on current hits and a polished presentation. Collins and most of the other staff members were fired, a new program director was hired, and the station became successful, especially in the early 1990s when country listenership reached new heights all across the U.S. and it began selling advertising in the Huntsville area. From 1986 to 1996, WDRM had high ratings with the "Bob and Elaine Morning Show," which claimed the highest ratings of any station in the country, gaining a 32 share of the audience in the ratings in 1992.
