= WAFN-FM =

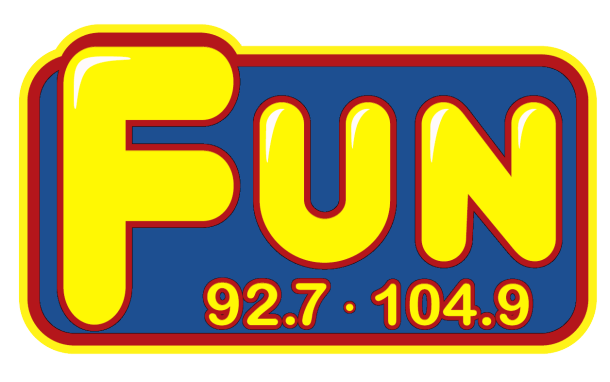
- Arab, Alabama; United States
- Frequency: 92.7 MHz
- Branding: Fun Radio

Programming
- Format: Classic hits
- Affiliations: United Stations Radio Networks

Ownership
- Owner: Fun Media Group, Inc.
- Sister stations: WAFN

History
- First air date: March 24, 1977
- Former call signs: WCRQ-FM (1977–1998); WAFN (1998–1999)
- Call sign meaning: Arab's Fun

Technical information
- Licensing authority: FCC
- Facility ID: 57439
- Class: A
- ERP: 1,150 watts
- HAAT: 202 meters (663 ft)
- Transmitter coordinates: 34°20′40″N 86°26′23″W
- Repeater: 1310 WAFN (Priceville))

Links
- Public license information: Public file; LMS
- Webcast: Listen live
- Website: www.fun927.com

WAFN-FM (92.7 FM) is an commercial radio station licensed to Arab, Alabama, United States. The station, established in 1977, is owned by Fun Media Group, Inc., broadcasts a classic hits format, and features programming from United Stations Radio Networks.

The station was originally WCRQ-FM, which had various formats. The call letters are currently used by a station in Calais, Maine. The station was assigned the WAFN-FM call letters by the Federal Communications Commission on September 9, 1999.

In addition to its usual music programming, WAFN-FM is an affiliate of the Tennessee Titans football radio network.
