= WWFF-FM =

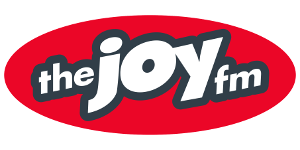
- New Market, Alabama; United States
- Broadcast area: Huntsville, Alabama
- Frequency: 93.3 MHz (HD Radio)
- Branding: The Joy FM

Programming
- Format: Contemporary Christian
- Subchannels: HD2: Contemporary worship music "Joy Worship"; HD3: Christian hip hop "LF Radio"

Ownership
- Owner: Radio Training Network

History
- First air date: July 1, 1962 (as WJIG-FM)
- Former call signs: WJIG-FM (1962–1973); WBGY-FM (1973–1986); WKQD (1986–1991); WHVK (1991–1995); WTZT (1/995-8/1995); WPZM (1995–2000); WXMR (2000–2002); WUSX (2002–2003); WHRP (2003–2007)
- Call sign meaning: Word of Faith and Forgiveness (Backronym for former Country format branded "The Wolf")

Technical information
- Licensing authority: FCC
- Facility ID: 65223
- Class: C1
- ERP: 14,500 watts
- HAAT: 278.5 meters (914 ft)
- Transmitter coordinates: 34°47′37″N 86°37′51″W

Links
- Public license information: Public file; LMS
- Webcast: Listen live
- Website: thejoyfm.com

WWFF-FM (93.3 MHz) is an American Christian radio station licensed to New Market, Alabama, and serving the Huntsville, Alabama, market. Owned by the Radio Training Network. its transmitter is located in Huntsville.

== History ==
The station started in 1962 as WJIG-FM in Tullahoma, Tennessee (simulcasting WJIG-AM), northeast of Huntsville. In 1987 as WKQD-FM, the transmitter was moved to Elora, Tennessee, near the Alabama state line, and the station began serving the Huntsville market. Its legal station ID at that time became "WKQD-FM, Tullahoma-Huntsville."

The station has sported various formats over the years, including disco (as "Boogie 93," WBGY-FM), CHR (as "The New Power 93 FM," WKQD), rock (as "93.3 The Ugly," WKQD), country (as "93.3 Huntsville's Country," WHVK; "93.3 The Twister," WTZT; "93.3 The Possum," WPZM; "US 93 FM," WUSX; and "93.3 The Wolf," WWFF-FM), and adult contemporary (as "Mix 93.3," WXMR). After an ownership change in 2003, it switched to a mainstream urban format (again branded "The All New Power 93.3"), originally playing Rap and R&B music as WHRP to compete with heritage urban station WEUP-FM. Over the course of several months in late 2005, the station gradually shifted from Hip Hop and R&B to Urban Adult Contemporary under the branding "93.3 WHRP, The Adult Mix."

On April 5, 2006, Cumulus acquired 94.1 WXQW, and it immediately began simulcasting WHRP. On December 21, 2007, 94.1 WXQW switched to the WHRP call letters, and 93.3 was assigned WWFF-FM.The new WHRP maintained the Urban AC format, and on January 12, 2008, WWFF-FM switched back to country, again branded as "The Wolf".

In 2008, the station's license was reassigned to New Market, Alabama, northeast of Huntsville, and the transmitter was again moved, this time to Drake Mountain in Huntsville. The 1,096-foot tower located one mile northwest of Elora that once broadcast the 93.3 MHz signal stood silent for many years with no antenna signal coming from it, still being owned by Cumulus Broadcasting, LLC of Atlanta, who acquired it from the Dunnavant family. The tall tower visible for miles was dismantled in 2022.

Following three-and-a-half years of poor ratings as a country outlet, on August 31, 2011, WWFF began stunting with a "wheel of formats" that consisted of classic country, oldies, CHR, smooth jazz, urban oldies, and urban AC, as well as news and local history trivia. It also included a tribute to Michael Jackson and snippets of Casey Kasem describing the then-new compact disc technology from a 1980s broadcast of his American Top 40 show. At exactly 9:33 AM on September 2, the station began airing its new format as "Journey 93-3", with a three-minute introduction, and a short promo by Randy Jackson, former bass player for the 1970s/1980s rock band Journey, followed by the group's 1981 song "Don't Stop Believin'". The format was promoted as a "journey" through 1980s and 1990s popular music, similar to other Journey-branded stations launched by Cumulus in Atlanta (W250BC) and Cincinnati (WNNF) earlier in the summer of 2011 (both have since changed formats).

WWFF-FM began airing all-Christmas music on November 16, 2012, at 5 p.m., still using the "Journey" moniker. It switched back to its 1980s/1990s hits format on December 26 at midnight.

On November 14, 2014, after stunting briefly with Christmas music, WWFF returned to country music under Cumulus's "Nash Icon" format, which focuses primarily on popular country music acts from the 1980s, 1990s and early 2000s.

On May 8, 2026, Cumulus announced it would sell WWFF, amongst other stations, to Radio Training Network for $2.45 million. The station flipped to their The Joy FM network of contemporary Christian music following the sale closure.

in September 2026, WWFF changed their format from country to contemporary Christian, branded as "The Joy FM".

== Ownership ==
The station was originally owned by Jerry Newton (the brother of famed Las Vegas entertainer Wayne Newton) and started circa 1973. In 1987, the station became WKQD and moved its transmitter to Elora, Tennessee, which would cover the original city of license (Tullahoma, Tennessee) along with the Huntsville area. The Dunnavant family LMAed the station in 1991 and eventually purchased the station outright. On April 1, 2003, the then-WUSX was sold by Athens Broadcasting Co. (William E. Dunnavant, president) to Cumulus Broadcasting, Inc. as part of a four-station deal with a total sale price of $22 million in cash and Cumulus common stock. The acquisition of the stations was completed in July 2003.
