= The Huntsville Times =

Daily newspaper in Huntsville, Alabama

- Type: Thrice Weekly newspaper
- Format: Broadsheet
- Owner(s): Advance Publications
- Editor-in-chief: Shelly Haskins
- Language: English
- Ceased publication: February 26, 2023
- Headquarters: 200 West Side Square, Huntsville, Alabama 35801
- Circulation: 57,073 Daily; 74,401 Sunday
- Price: Wed./Fri. $1; Sun./day after Thanksgiving Day $2
- Website: al.com

The Huntsville Times was a thrice-weekly newspaper published in Huntsville, Alabama. It also served the surrounding areas of north Alabama's Tennessee Valley region. The Times formerly operated as an afternoon paper, but moved to mornings years after The Huntsville News ceased publication. It was published by The Huntsville Times Company, Inc., a subsidiary of Advance Publications, Inc. The paper was first acquired by Advance's founder, Samuel Newhouse Sr., in 1955. The Times is a sister paper to two other Advance-owned publications within Alabama, The Birmingham News and the (Mobile) Press-Register.

On October 1, 2012, all three papers went from daily to thrice-weekly print schedules. All three are now published by an Advance subsidiary called Alabama Media Group.

On February 26, 2023, the Times and its sister newspapers ceased printed publication, with all of its content moving to the group's website, al.com.

The Times had the third highest circulation of any daily newspaper in the state until its 2012 schedule reduction.

Because Huntsville is the home to NASA's Marshall Space Flight Center and the Army's Redstone Arsenal, the Times maintained a special desk for science, aerospace and military matters.

The Times received many awards over the years from the Alabama Press Association, the Society for Professional Journalists and other trade groups.

== Print-edition cutbacks ==
On May 24, 2012, Advance Publications announced that its three Alabama newspapers would do away with their print editions on Mondays, Tuesdays, Thursdays and Saturdays. The move was a result of the continuing decline in advertising revenue and circulation for its traditional print products. The move placed increased emphasis on their website, al.com, and reorganized the Alabama properties into two companies: Alabama Media Group, the editorial side; and Advance Central Services Alabama, which will handle production, distribution and back-office services.

The company also announced that same day that The Times-Picayune of New Orleans, Louisiana, would undergo the same changes. The company has since made similar changes to what had been daily newspapers in both Syracuse, New York, and Harrisburg, Pennsylvania.

The final daily edition was published on September 30, 2012. The next day was the first time in more than a century that the city of Huntsville had been without a daily newspaper.

On November 3, 2022, Advance management announced that the Times, as well as its sister newspapers in Birmingham and Mobile, would discontinue its print edition and convert to an all-digital operation. The final print edition came on February 26, 2023.

Patrick McCauley, a native of Alexandria, Louisiana, was the longest-serving editor of the daily Huntsville Times, a post he filled from 1966 to 1994. A previous editor, Reese Thomas Amis (1888–1964), had mentored McCauley when he was a reporter at The Times from 1949 to 1954.
