= Troy University at Montgomery =

Satellite campus of Troy University in Alabama

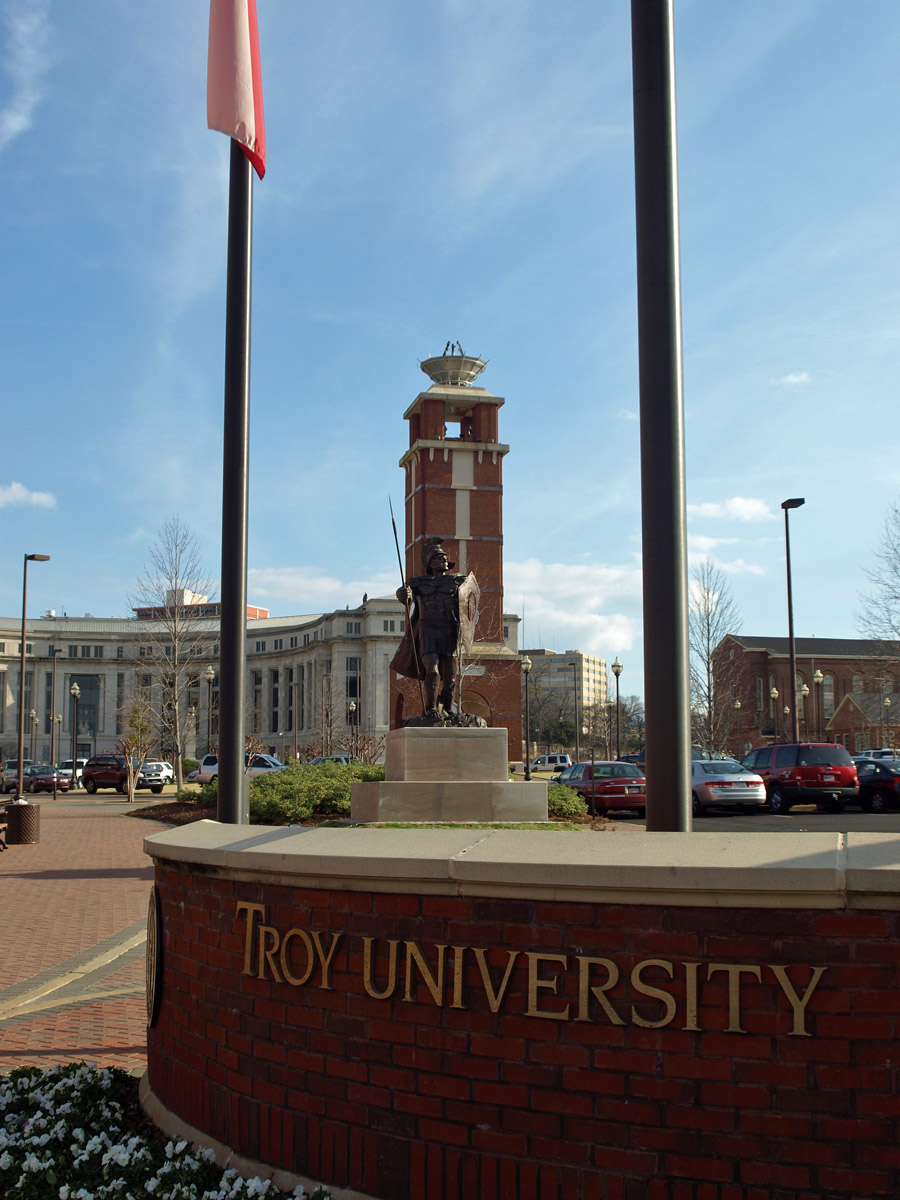
- The courtyard on Troy-Montgomery's campus
- Former name: Troy State University at Montgomery
- Type: Public university, Master's university
- Established: 1965; 61 years ago
- Affiliations: Troy University System
- Chancellor: Dr. Jack Hawkins, Jr.
- Vice-Chancellor: Dr. Dionne Rosser-Mims
- Dean: Jim Smith, M.S.
- Students: 774
- Undergraduates: 572
- Postgraduates: 195
- Other students: 7
- Location: Montgomery, Alabama, United States; 32°22′33″N 86°18′40″W
- Campus: Urban Downtown Montgomery campus
- Colors: cardinal, white and black
- Mascot: Trojan
- Website: https://www.troy.edu/montgomery
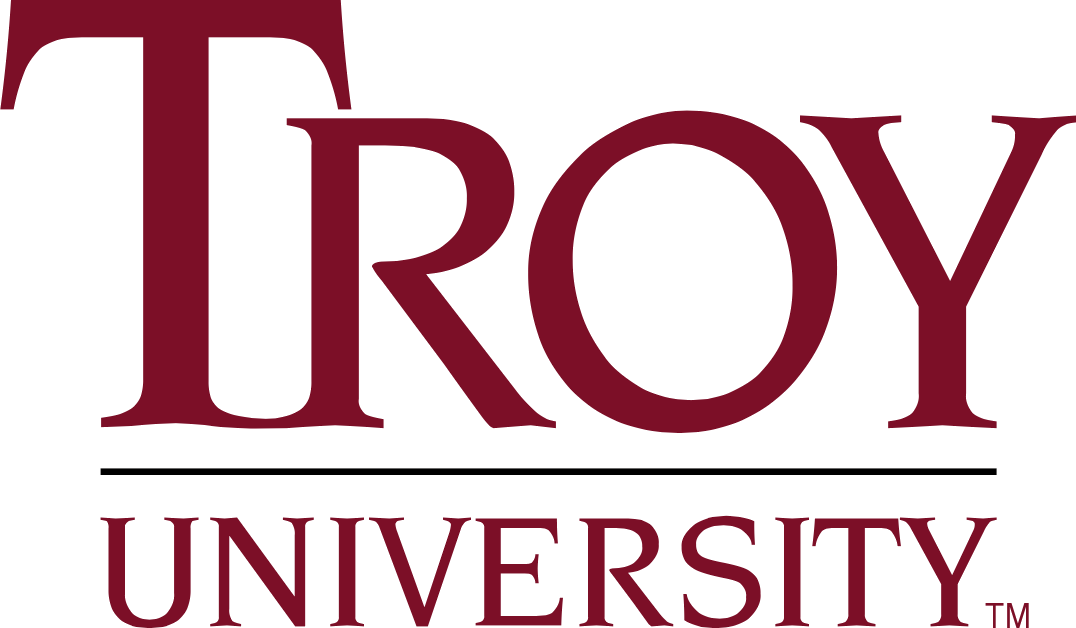

Troy University at Montgomery is a satellite campus of Troy University and is located in Montgomery, Alabama. It is part of the Troy University System. The campus is located in the western part of downtown, and includes the Rosa Parks Museum and Library, the Davis Theatre for the Performing Arts, and portions of the historic Bell Building. But also has other campuses around the state of Alabama.

== History ==
The campus has its roots in extension courses offered at Maxwell Air Force Base in Montgomery during the 1950s. A separate Troy State College teaching center was established at Maxwell in 1965, which led to the creation of the present-day Montgomery Campus.

In 1982, the Montgomery and Dothan campuses were granted independent accreditation, and the Troy State University System was formed. In April 2004, "State" was dropped from the University's name to reflect the institution's new, broader focus. In August 2005, all Troy campuses were reunified under one accreditation.

== Academics ==
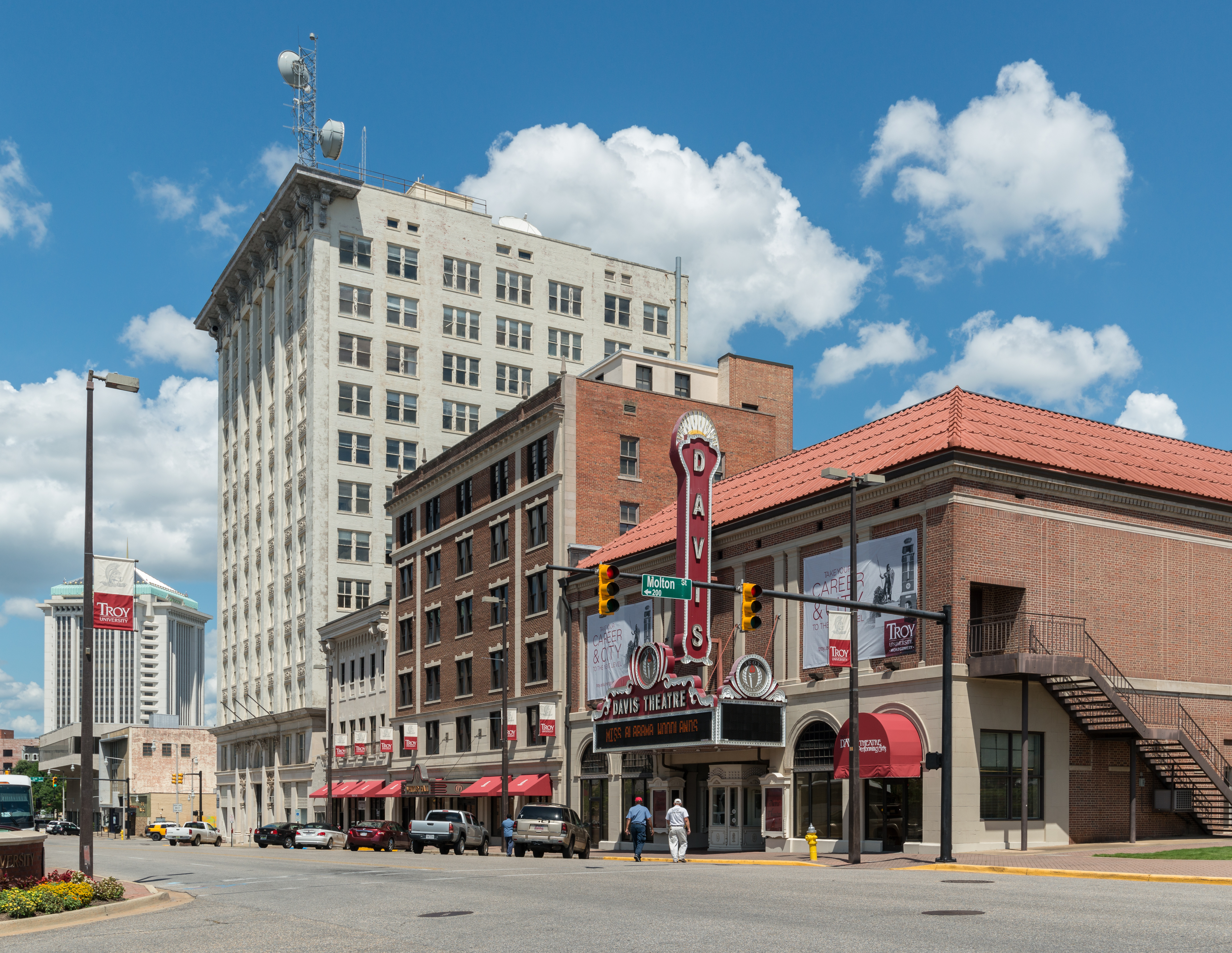
Troy University buildings, including Bell Tower and the Davis Theatre

For several years in a row, the Princeton Review named the university to its "Best in the Southeast" list due to excellence in academic programs and institutional data collected from the university.

=== Structure ===
Troy University at Montgomery offers 3 associate degree programs, 15 bachelor's degree programs, 10 master's degree programs, and one doctoral program. The school also offers 2 education specialist programs. In addition to the nontraditional programs and courses offered on the Montgomery Campus, students are also given access to all the degree programs and courses offered at other Troy University campuses.

All degree programs can also work in conjunction with Troy University's other campuses, allowing students to take additional classes at different Troy campuses at the same time if necessary.

=== Classes ===
The majority of the classes offered on the Montgomery campus are evening classes. All of the degrees offered by the campus can be completed entirely through evening classes. There are also classes offered online through in conjunction with military students at Maxwell Air Force Base. Additional weekend, television, and online courses are also available.

=== Schools/Colleges ===
The university is composed of five academic colleges, a graduate school, and a division of general studies:

- College of Arts & Sciences
- College of Education
- College of Communications & Fine Arts
- Sorrell College of Business
- College of Heath & Human Services
- The Graduate School
- Division of General Studies

== Military and Veterans ==
Since 1950, Troy University has worked with military service members, veterans and their families as they pursue advanced education under the G.I. Bill, the Tuition Assistance Program, the MyCAA initiative, private funding and other financing options. Troy University is an educational partner with the U.S. Army, Navy, Air Force, Marine Corps and Coast Guard, providing military-specific scholarships and TROY for Troops support centers to military-affiliated students and veterans. The University has a presence on or near over 30 military installations worldwide and participates in online learning programs with all service branches.

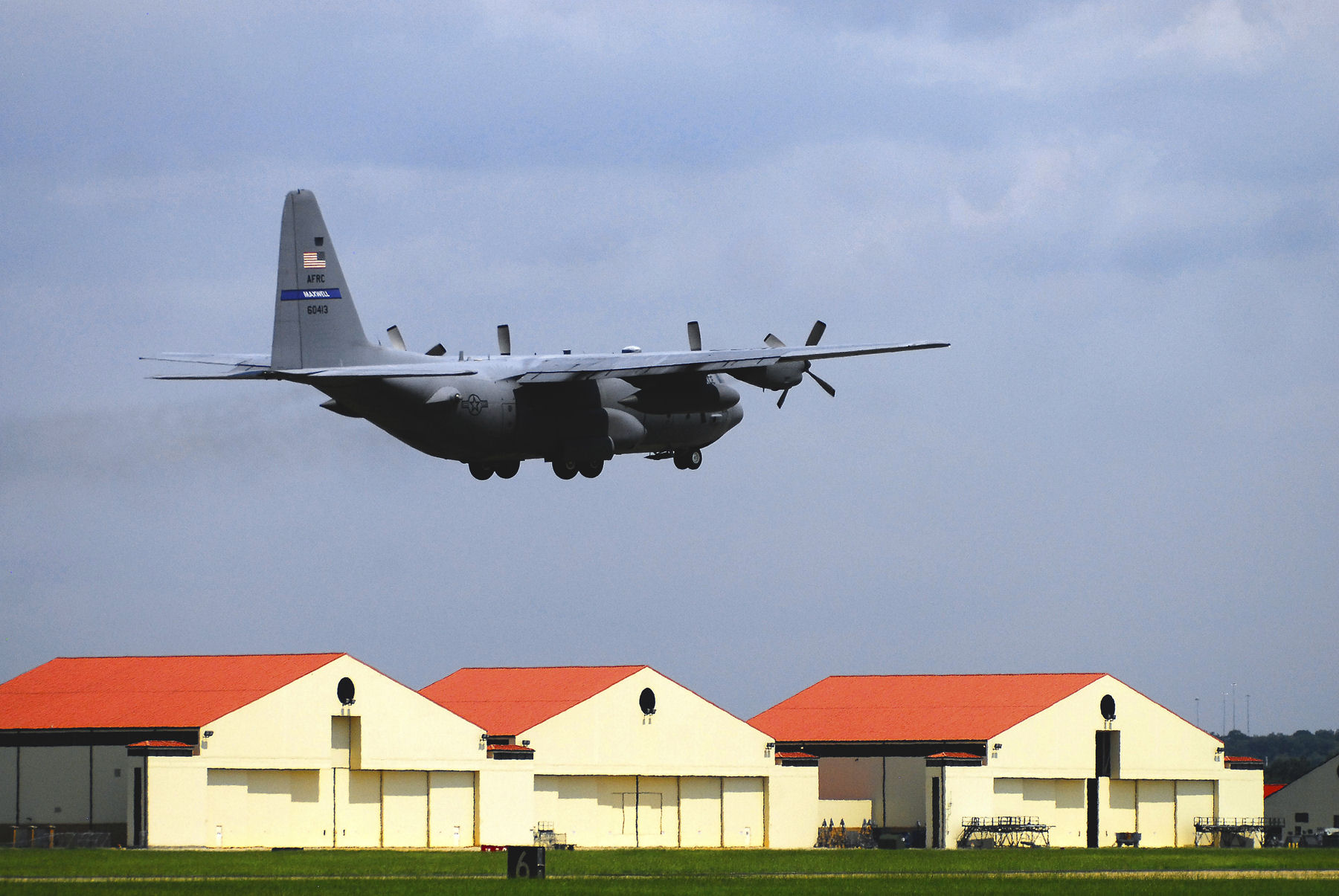
Maxwell Air Force Base, where Troy maintains an instructional site for military students.

Troy currently offers an educational support site for military personnel at nearby Maxwell Air Force Base.

== Student life ==
=== Student organizations ===
- Student Government Association (SGA)
- Alpha Sigma Lambda (NHS)
- Gamma Beta Phi (NHS)
- Chi Sigma Iota
- English Club
- A World Around You (AWAY) International Student Organization
- Psychology Club
- Social Justice Club

== Campus ==
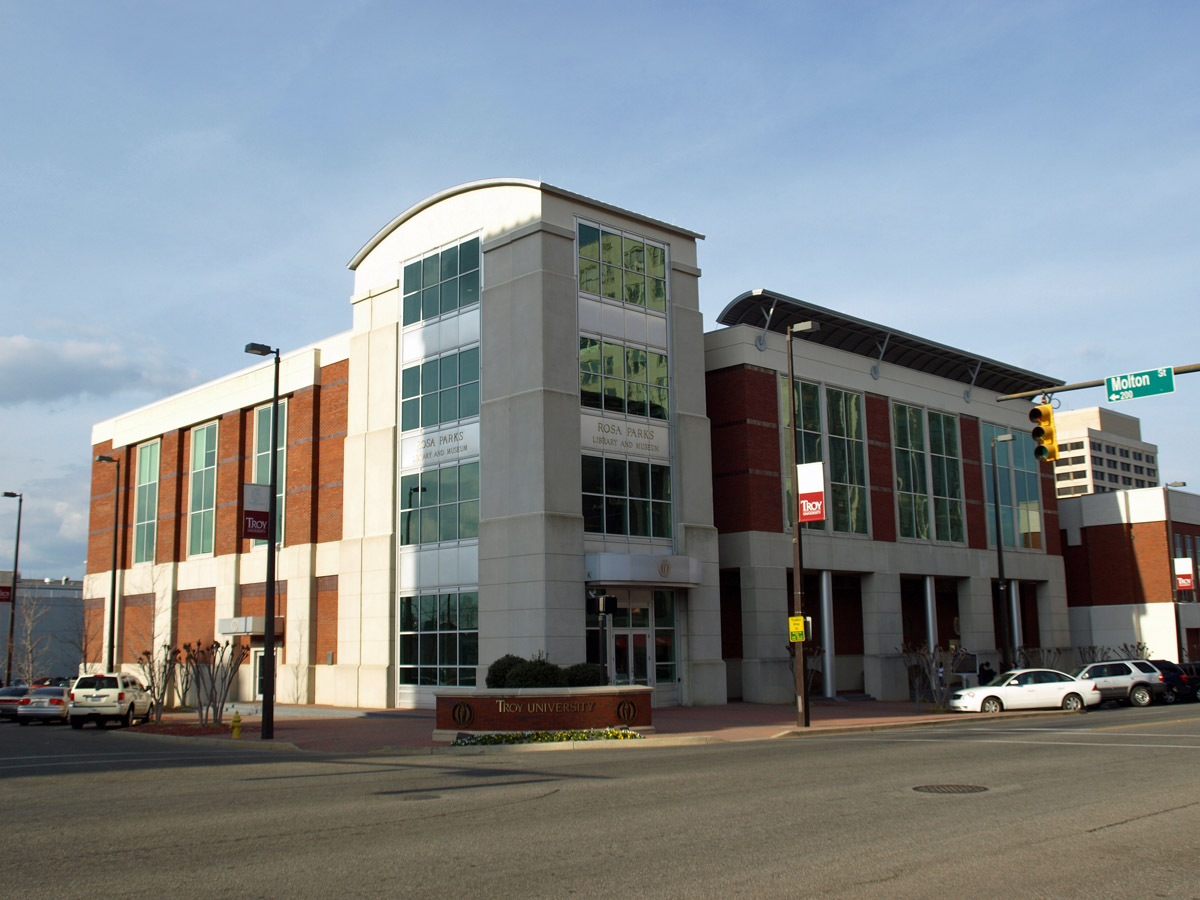
The Rosa Parks Museum. owned and operated by Troy University.

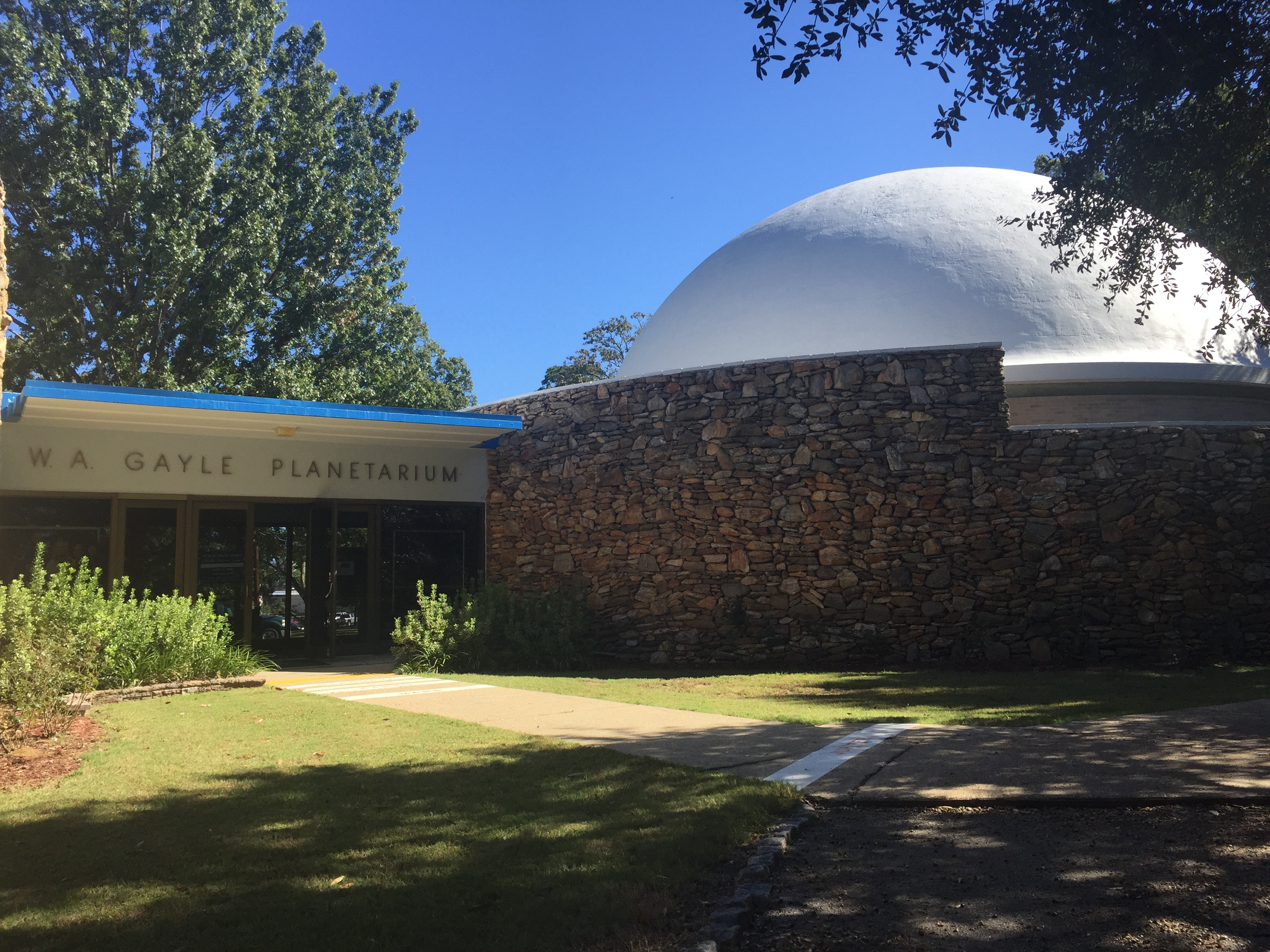
The Gayle Planetarium, located on the Troy University-Montgomery campus.

The following are some of the features on the Troy University-Montgomery campus:

- Historic Davis Theater (formerly the Paramount Theater)
- Rosa Parks Museum
- Bell Building
- Bell Tower
- Barnes & Noble College Bookstore
- Starbucks
- Whitley Hall
- Bartlett Hall

Troy University-Montgomery has a well-facilitated campus with extensive support services for students. The campus is located in downtown Montgomery, where it houses the historic Davis Theater for the Performing Arts and the Rosa Parks Museum and Library. The campus also consists of Whitley Hall, portions of the historic Bell Building, the Bartlett building, and the School of Nursing building. The Gene Elrod Success Center provides a congenial learning environment where students are given academic tutoring and counseling. Career guidance and study skill workshops are among the other services offered by this center. The university library offers abundant resources and reference materials for students, both online and offline.
