= Troy University at Dothan =

Satellite campus of Troy University in Alabama, US

- Former name: Troy State University at Dothan
- Type: Public university, Master's university
- Established: 1961
- Chancellor: Jack Hawkins, Jr, PhD
- Vice-Chancellor: Orrin K. (Skip) Ames III, J.D., LL.M.
- Students: 3,023
- Location: Dothan, Alabama, United States; 32°22′33″N 86°18′40″W
- Website: www.troy.edu

Troy University at Dothan is a satellite campus of Troy University and is located in Dothan, Alabama.

The campus has its roots in extension courses offered at Fort Rucker, Alabama in the 1950s. A separate Troy State College teaching center was established at Fort Rucker in the 1960s, which led to the creation of the present-day Dothan Campus. In 1982, the Montgomery and Dothan campuses were granted independent accreditation, and the Troy State University System was formed. In April 2004, "State" was dropped from the university's name to reflect the institution's new, broader focus. In August 2005, all Troy campuses were reunified under one accreditation.

In 2019, Troy University at Dothan opened Coleman Hall, an education center for children aged 6 weeks to 4 years old. The center serves as a training center for university students pursuing careers that involve working with children.
