= Rosa Parks Museum =

Museum in Alabama, United States

Coordinates: 32.37672°N 86.31111°W

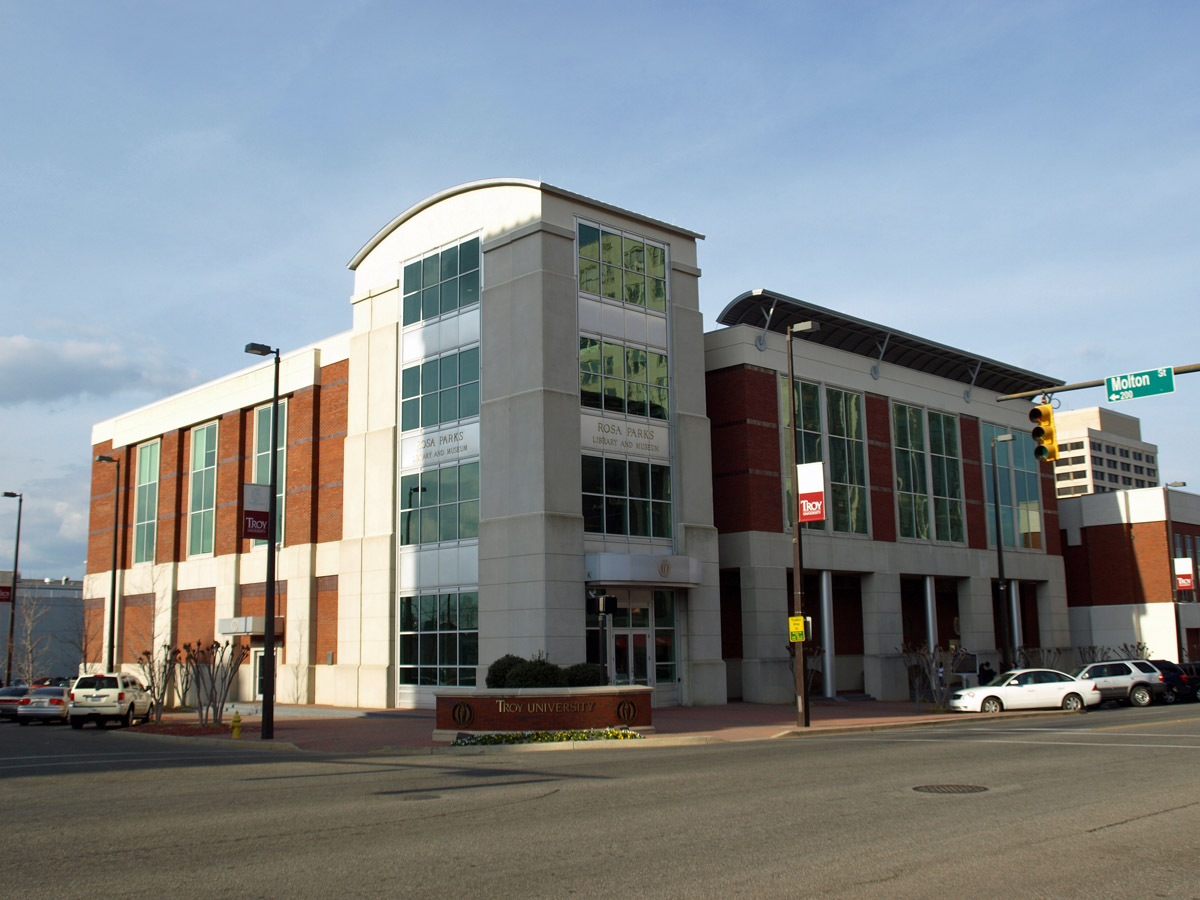
- Rosa Parks Museum
- Rosa Parks Museum
- Location: 252 Montgomery Street, Montgomery, Alabama 36104
- Country: United States
- Website: https://www.troy.edu/student-life-resources/arts-culture/rosa-parks-museum/visit.html

History
- Founded: December 1, 2000

The Rosa Parks Museum is located on the Troy University at Montgomery satellite campus, in Montgomery, Alabama. It has information, exhibits, and some artifacts from the 1955 Montgomery bus boycott. This museum is named after civil rights activist Rosa Parks, who is known for refusing to surrender her seat to a white person on a city bus.

The Rosa Parks Museum gives visitors a closer look at the Montgomery bus boycott and the people who helped shape the Civil Rights movement. There are many historical artifacts, interactive exhibits, audio storytelling, and a reenactment of Rosa Parks's arrest. Visitors can learn more about what happened during that time and why these events were important in the fight against discrimination and racial segregation.

== Museum ==
Inside the museum, there are interactive activities and even a reenactment of what happened on the bus as if you were outside the bus watching. There are artifacts in the museum from the Montgomery Bus Boycott.

This museum is significant to Montgomery because it exhibits events that had occurred during the civil rights era in Alabama. One of the reasons to build the museum was due to the bus boycott that occurred in Montgomery. It was built in Rosa Parks's honor to educate and tell people of her story. While the actual bus on which the incident occurred is on display at The Henry Ford Museum in Dearborn, Michigan, the Rosa Parks Museum hosts an identical replica.

=== Exhibits ===
The Rosa Parks Museum features six exhibition areas that explore the Montgomery bus boycott and the Civil Rights Movement. Visitors can view historical displays, which includes a replica bus and materials related to Rosa Parks's arrest. The exhibits explain how the African American community organized transportation during the boycott. The children's wing includes an educational exhibit called the Cleveland Avenue Time Machine, which introduces younger visitors to the history of racial segregation.

== Museum development ==
Before the museum was established, Troy University considered using the property for parking. University officials later pursued plans for a museum after observing public interest in a historical marker identifying the location associated with Rosa Parks arrest. The museum opened on December 1, 2000, the 45th anniversary of Parks arrest. Rosa Parks was scheduled to attend the dedication ceremony.

== Dedication ==
Troy University wanted to dedicate their new library and museum to Rosa Parks, "The Mother of the Civil Rights Movement". The library carries her name and it commemorates her refusal to give up her seat on the Montgomery City Bus to a white man. The museum and library were opened on the anniversary of the day she refused to give up her seat: December 1.

=== Historical significance ===
The Rosa Parks Museum is located near the site where Rosa Parks was arrested on December 1, 1955, after refusing to give up her seat on a Montgomery city bus. The museum opened on December 1, 2000, marking exactly 45 years after her arrest. Its location reminds visitors of an important and relevant moment in American history. The museum preserves the story of Rosa Parks and all those who played a role in the Civil Rights Movement.

== See also ==
- List of museums focused on African Americans
