= Troy University =

Public university in Troy, Alabama, US

Coordinates: 31°47′53″N 85°57′14″W

- Former name: List: State Normal School (1887–1929) Troy State Teachers College (1929–1957) Troy State College (1957–1967) Troy State University (1967–2005)
- Motto: "Educate the Mind to Think, the Heart to Feel, and the Body to Act"
- Type: Public university
- Established: 1887; 139 years ago
- Accreditation: SACS
- Endowment: $168.3 million (2025)
- Chancellor: Jack Hawkins Jr.
- Students: 14,156 (fall 2022, all campuses and online students)
- Location: Troy, Alabama, US
- Campus: 820 acres (330 ha); Remote town
- Other campuses: Dothan; Montgomery; Phenix City
- Newspaper: The Tropolitan
- Nickname: Trojans
- Sporting affiliations: NCAA Division I FBS – Sun Belt
- Mascot: T-Roy
- Website: troy.edu
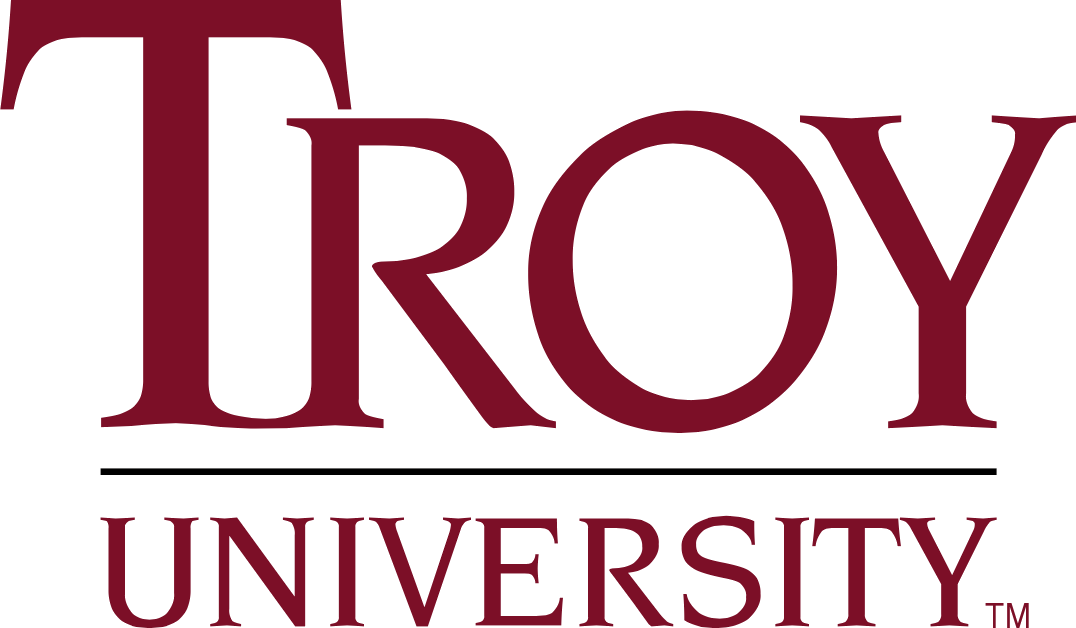

Troy University is a public university in Troy, Alabama, United States. It was founded in 1887 as the State Normal School within the Alabama State University System and is now the flagship university of the Troy University System. It was one of about 180 "normal schools" founded by state governments in the 19th century to train teachers for the rapidly growing public common schools. Some closed but most steadily expanded their role and became state colleges in the early 20th century and state universities in the late 20th century.

Troy University is accredited by the Southern Association of Colleges and Schools Commission on Colleges (SACS) to award associate, baccalaureate, master's, education specialist, and doctoral degrees.

In August 2005, Troy State University, Montgomery; Troy State University, Phenix City; Troy State University, Dothan; and Troy State University (main campus) all merged under one accreditation to become Troy University. Prior to the merger, each campus was independently accredited. The merger combined staff, faculty, and administrators into a single university.

Today, the university serves the educational needs of students in four Alabama campuses and 60 teaching sites in 17 U.S. states and 11 countries. Troy University has over 100,000 alumni in 50 states of the U.S. and in other countries.

== History ==
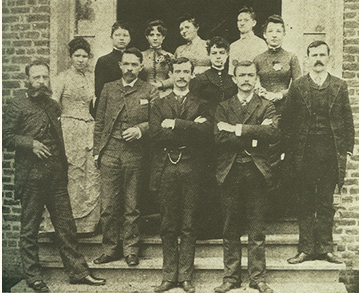
State Normal School organizing faculty (1887)

Troy University is a public university with its main campus located in Troy, Alabama. It was founded as a normal school in 1887 with a mission to educate and train new teachers. Laura Montgomery Henderson was one of the school's original teachers.

Over time, the school evolved into a four-year college and in 1957 the Alabama Board of Education adopted the name "Troy State College" and granted it the right to issue master's degrees. In the 1960s the college opened satellite sites in Montgomery, Phenix City, and Dothan to serve the military personnel posted at Maxwell AFB, Fort Benning, and Fort Rucker (now Fort Novosel). More sites associated with military centers located throughout the United States and abroad followed in the subsequent decades, as well as support centers for students and alumni unrelated to the military. As a leader in online education, Troy University began offering online courses in the Fall Semester of 1997. Troy University is known for its innovation in offering in-class and online academic programs in servicing traditional, nontraditional, and military students. In spring 2018, Troy University was ranked #19 among the "Most Innovative Schools" in U.S. News & World Report's annual peer assessment survey. The main campus enrollment as of the fall of 2016 is 7,911 students. The campus consists of 36 major buildings on 650 acres (260 ha) plus the adjacent Troy University Arboretum.

At least three prominent political figures have been associated with Troy University: George Wallace Jr., son of the late Governor George C. Wallace, who was a former administrator at the university; Max Rafferty, the California Superintendent of Public Instruction from 1963 to 1971, was dean of the education department from 1971 until his death in 1982; former Governor John Malcolm Patterson taught U.S. history at the institution during the 1980s.

=== Name change ===
When created by the Alabama Legislature on February 26, 1887, it was officially named the State Normal School. The school was located in downtown Troy until moving to the present location on University Avenue in 1930.

In 1929, the name was changed to Troy State Teachers College and it subsequently conferred its first baccalaureate degree in 1931.

In 1957, the legislature voted both to change the name to Troy State College and to allow it to begin a master's degree program. The name was changed once again in 1967 to Troy State University.

On April 16, 2004, the board of trustees voted to change the name of the institution from Troy State University to Troy University. The transition to the new name was completed in August 2005 and was the fourth in the school's history.

== Troy University System ==
The Troy University System (formerly known as the Troy State University System) is a public university system in Alabama that coordinates and oversees the three branch universities of Troy University. The system was formed in 1982, as the campuses in Dothan and Montgomery were granted independent accreditation status. In April 2004, "State" was dropped from the university's name to reflect the institution's new, broader focus. In August 2005, all Troy campuses were unified under one accreditation.

Troy University has a total of four campuses located across the state of Alabama:

- Troy University (main campus)
- Troy University at Montgomery
- Troy University at Dothan
- Troy University at Phenix City

In addition to the four campuses, there are also 23 additional support sites across the southeastern United States and other countries.

== Academics ==
Troy University cumulatively offers 46 bachelor's degree programs, 22 master's degree programs, and 3 doctoral programs.

=== Organization ===
The university is composed of five colleges, a graduate school, and a division of general studies:

- College of Arts & Sciences
- College of Communications & Fine Arts
- College of Education
- College of Health & Human Services
- The Sorrell College of Business
- The Graduate School
- The Division of General Studies

=== Confucius Institute ===
Established in 2007, the Confucius Institute at Troy University was a public institution affiliated with the Ministry of Education of the People's Republic of China, funded and arranged in part by Hanban, which is itself affiliated with the Chinese government, and the stated aim of which is to promote the Chinese language and culture, support local Chinese teaching, and facilitate cultural exchanges. The institute also offered summer camps for high school students, consultation for economic development, and promotion of Chinese outreach programs. Some expressed concerns related to academic freedom and political influence of the Chinese government specially regarding such things as the comment of a former senior Chinese official, Li Changchun that Confucius Institutes are "an important part of China's overseas propaganda set-up". Troy University was the first college in Alabama to open a Confucius Institute. Troy closed the institute in March of 2023, since the 2021 National Defense Authorization Act would remove the university's eligibility to receive defense funding for having the institute starting in October of that year.

=== Center for International Programs ===
The university has over 800 international students from 75 countries on the main campus, and it offers special programs for students such as the English as Second Language Center (ECL). Troy also has a dormitory named Pace Hall which serves as the main dormitory hall for international students.

=== Undergraduate admissions ===
In 2025, Troy accepted 92.6% of undergraduate applicants with those enrolled having an average 3.5 high school GPA and an average 1060 SAT score (6% submitting) or an average 21 ACT score (57% submitting).

=== Rankings ===
Academic rankings

Master's
- Washington Monthly: 483

Regional
- U.S. News & World Report: 45 (South) (tied)

National
- Forbes: 640

Troy University has acquired several different institutional rankings:

- In 2019, Forbes ranked Troy as the 640th-best school in the nation. Forbes' overall ranking centers on the value of the degree obtained by a university's students and measures, in part, the marketplace success of a school's graduate.
- For 2020, U.S. News & World Report ranked Troy in categories for the Regional Universities, South Region, as well as separate categories for Best University Online Programs, as follow:

Category	Rank
Regional University, South	No.45 (tied; out of 135)
Top Public Schools in Regional Universities, South	No.27
Best Online Graduate Business Programs (Excluding MBA)	No.61 (tie)
Best Online Graduate Business Programs for Veterans (Excluding MBA)	No.27
Best Online MBA Programs	No.95 (tie)
Best Online MBA Programs for Veterans	No.53 (tie)
Best Online Master's in Criminal Justice Programs	No.17 (tie)
Best Online Master's in Criminal Justice Programs for Veterans	No.11 (tie)
Best Online Graduate Education Programs	No.89 (tie)
Best Online Master's in Nursing Programs	No.14 (tie)
Best Online Master's in Nursing Programs for Veterans	No.6 (tie)

== Campus ==
Troy University's main campus is located near downtown Troy. The campus sits along rolling hills with many old oak trees present along the streets and throughout campus. The first two buildings that were built on campus were John Robert Lewis Hall (formerly Bibb Graves Hall) and Shackelford Hall, both of which are still standing on campus today. Bibb Graves, who was Alabama's governor at the time of the building's dedication, is remembered for commissioning the Olmsted Brothers architectural firm of Brookline, Massachusetts, to design the campus landscape plan. The Troy University Board of Trustees voted to rename the hall in John Lewis's honor on August 26, 2020.

Across from the chapel is a very small lake named Lake Lagoona, which is the drainage point of the creek that runs through the Trojan Oaks Golf Course.

The Trojan Oaks Golf Practice Course, which used to be full-service, 9-hole, 3,211-yard golf course, is one of the pristine features of the campus with its rolling hills, oak and pine trees, and a creek running through most of the course. Troy was one of only 87 universities in the United States to have operated a full-service golf course on its own campus before closing the course and revamping it into a golf practice facility, and is still one of the few schools to operate a 9-hole or greater practice course on its campus.

One of the favorite features of the campus is Janice Hawkins Park, which features an amphitheater, walking trails, a lagoon and several prominent art installations. Paved sidewalks curve throughout that park, and a pedestrian bridge straddles the lagoon on one end. Among the art installations are the "Violata Pax Dove", by the artist Fred "Nall" Hollis, and 200 replica terracotta warriors that are spread throughout the park, representing the famous excavations in China.

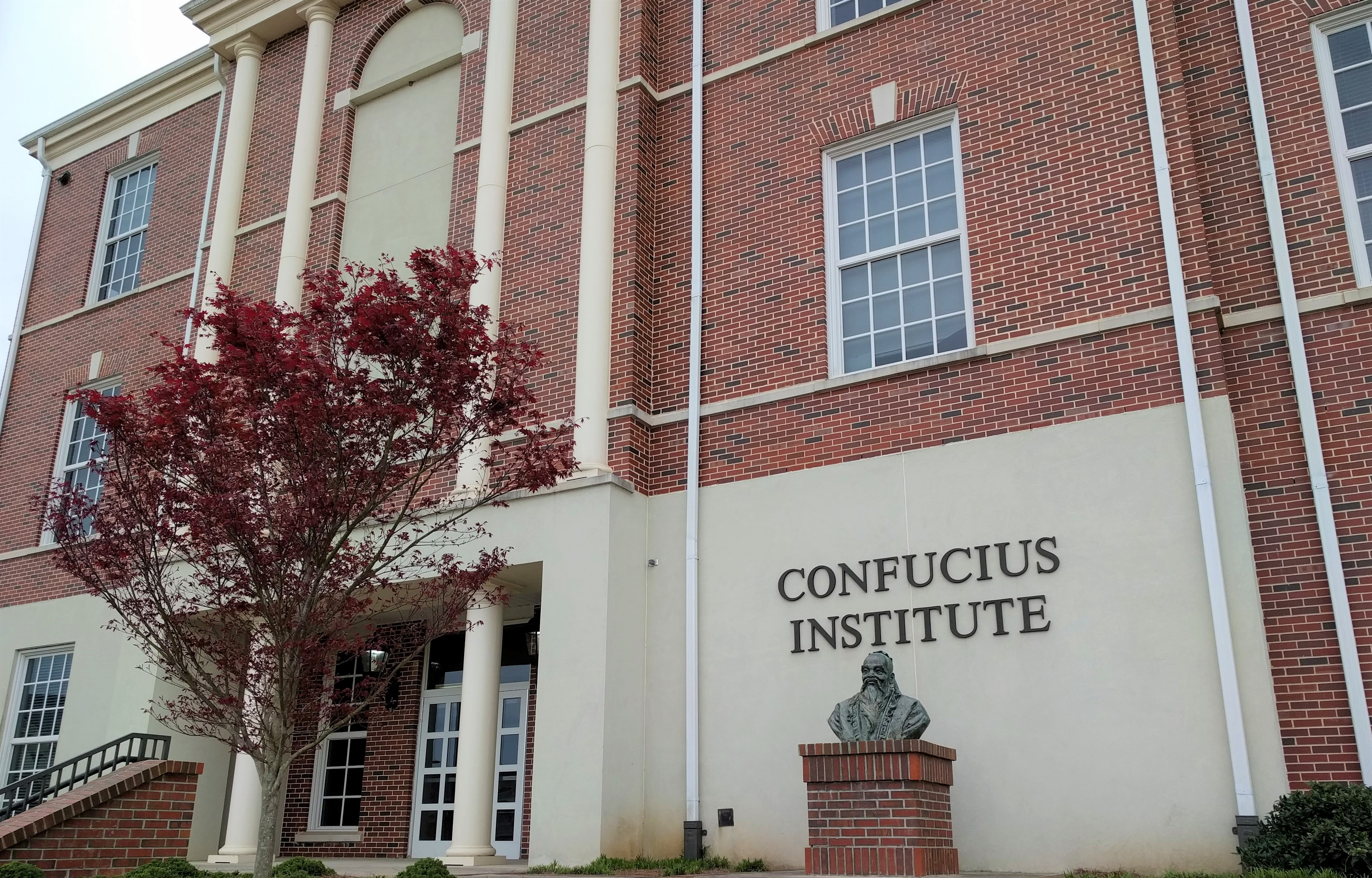
The Confucius Institute on campus

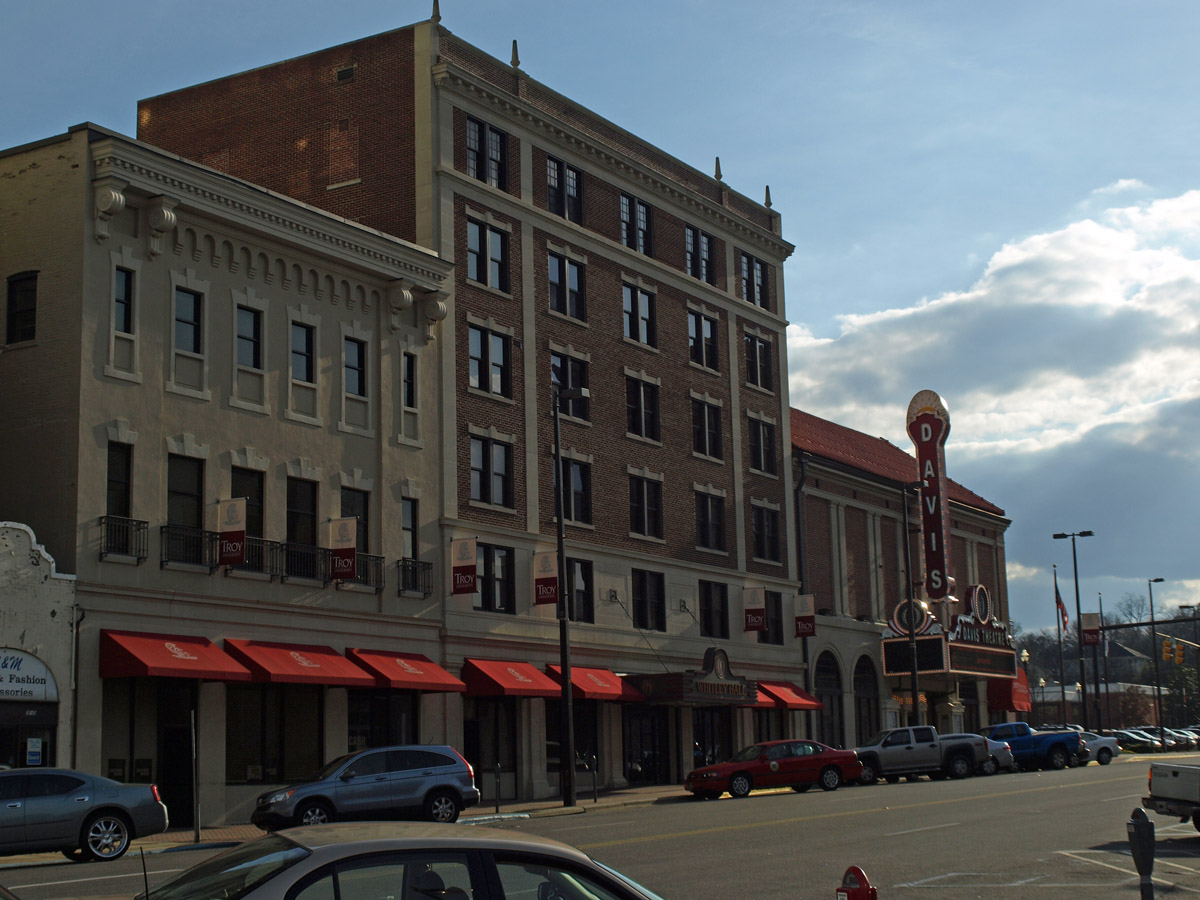
Troy University buildings in downtown Montgomery

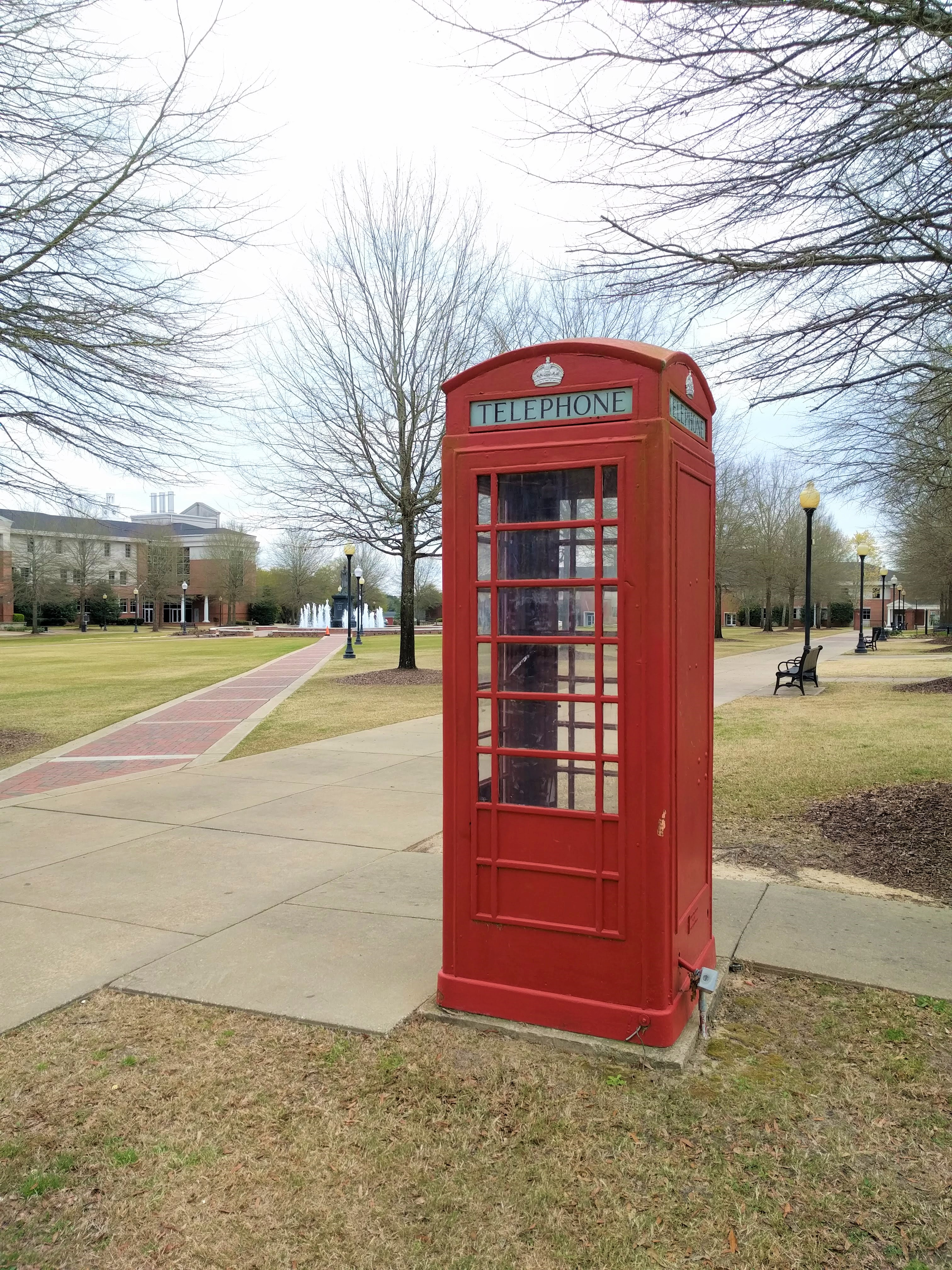
Old telephone booth at the university

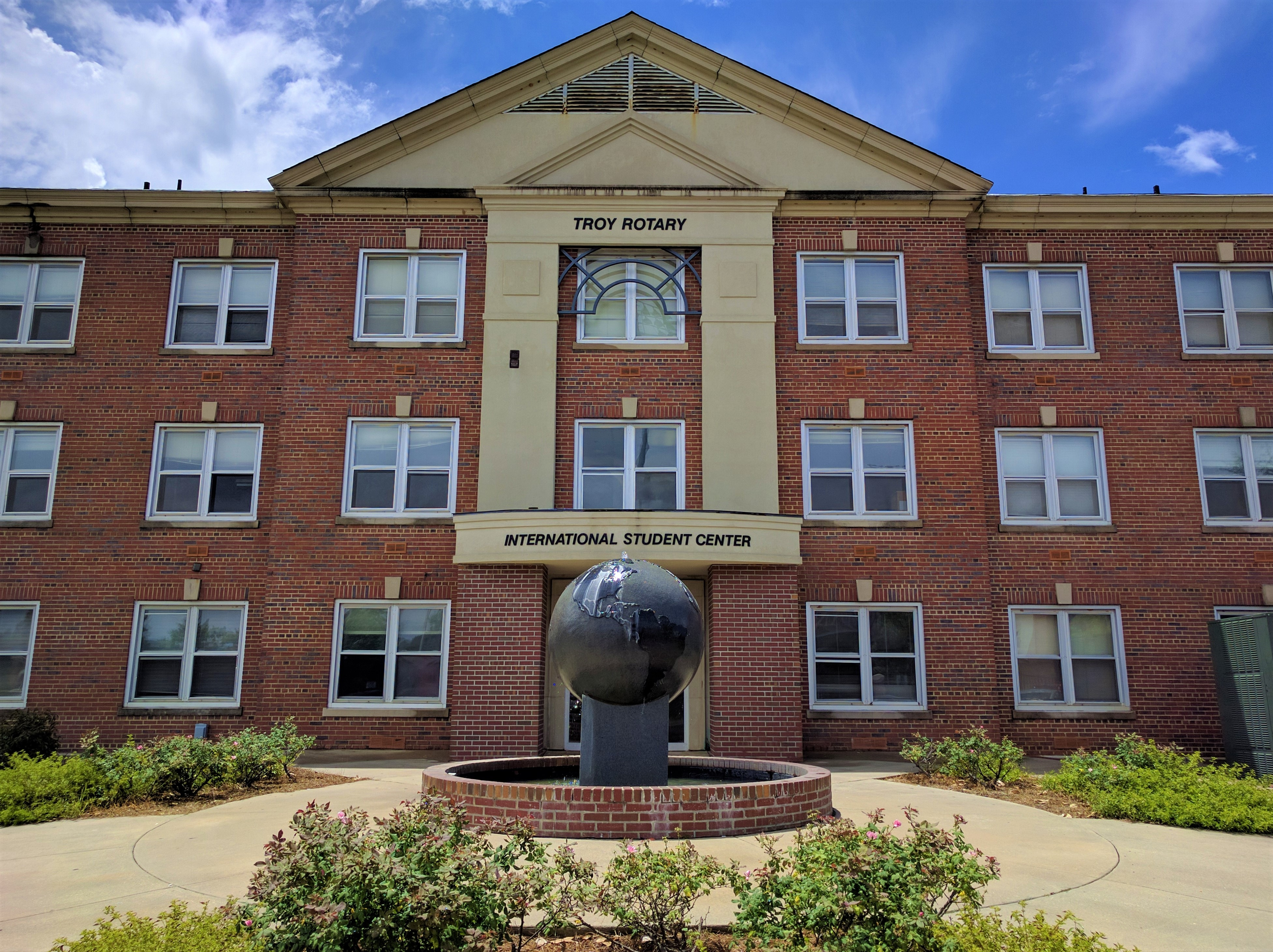
The international student living/learning center, Pace Hall

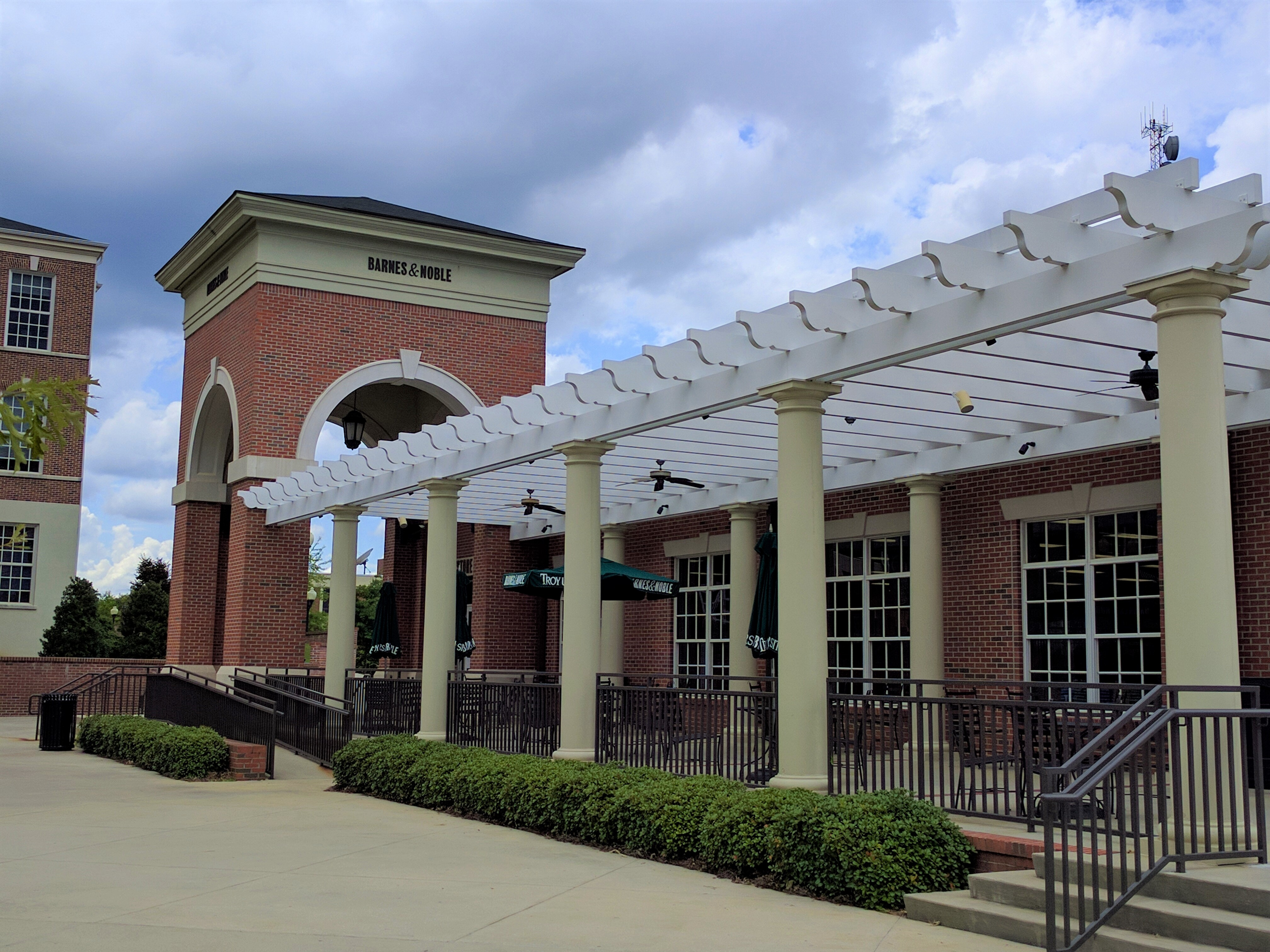
The Barnes & Noble campus bookstore

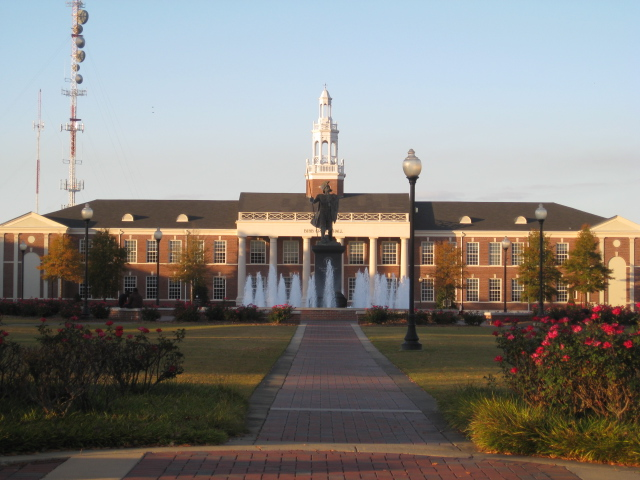
Bibb Graves Hall from University Avenue

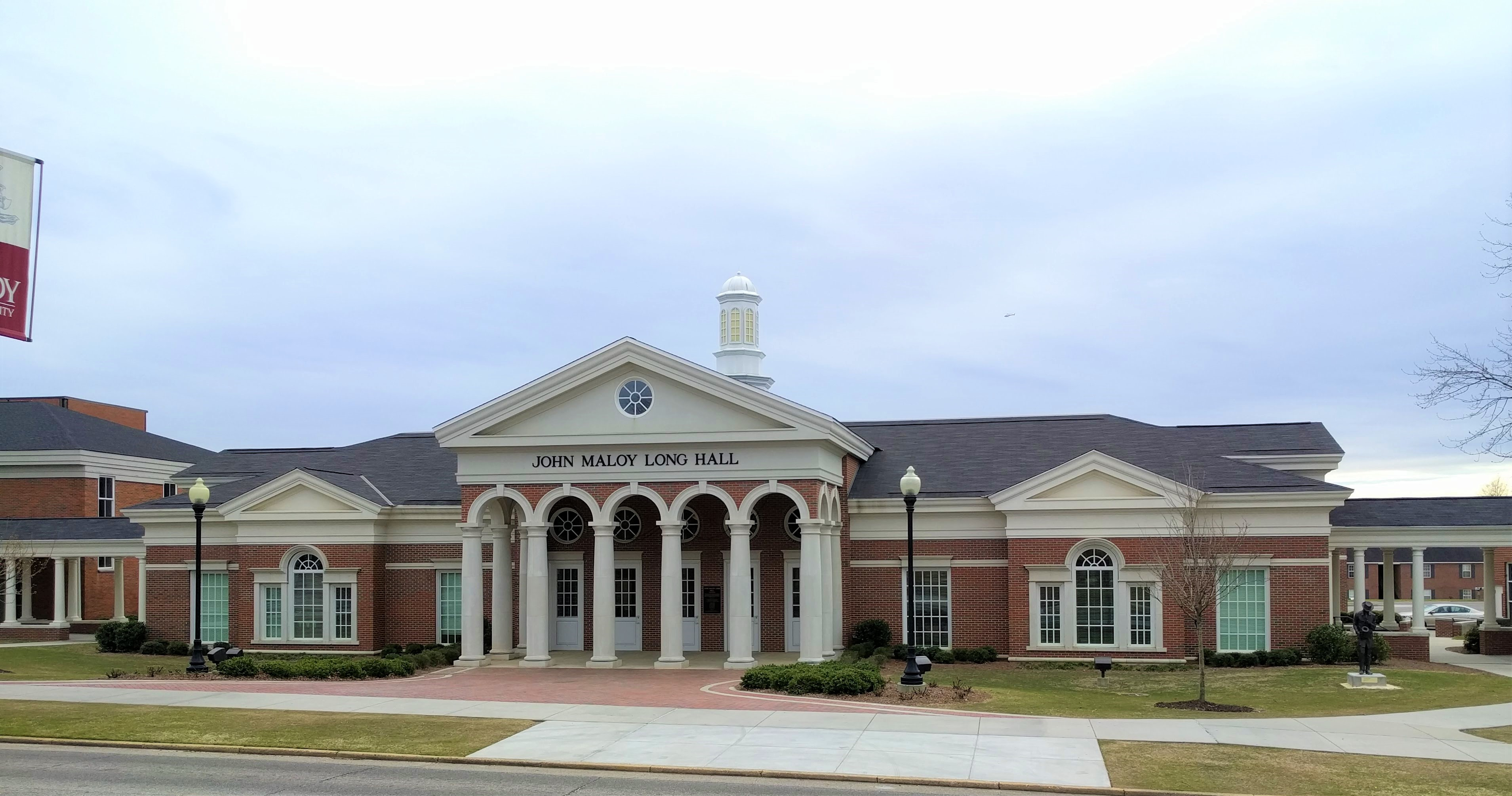
John Maloy Long Hall

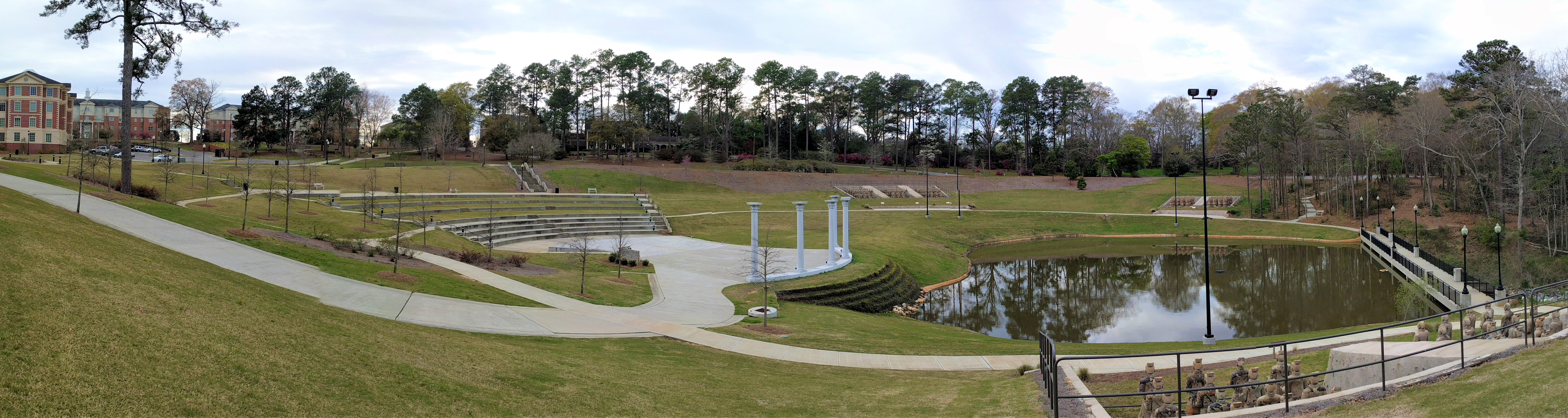
Janice Hawkins Cultural Arts Park

== Student life ==
=== Student body ===
There are 14,881 students enrolled at Troy as of Fall 2022.

Undergraduate demographics as of Fall 2023
Race and ethnicity	Total
White	53%
Black	32%
Hispanic	5%
Two or more races	4%
International student	3%
Unknown	2%
Asian	1%
Economic diversity
Low-income (Note: The percentage of students who received an income-based federal Pell grant intended for low-income students.)	44%
Affluent (Note: The percentage of students who are a part of the American middle class at the bare minimum.)	56%

=== Residence halls ===
Students who live on campus at Troy have a choice of 12 different residential halls to choose from:

- Clements Hall (coed by floor)
- Gardner Hall (men)
- Hamil Hall (women)
- Honors Cottage (coed)
- Newman Center (coed by floor)
- Pace Hall (coed by floor)
- Rushing Hall (formerly New Residence) (coed by building)
- Shackelford Hall (coed by floor)
- Trojan Village (coed by floor)
- University Apartments (coed)

=== Trojan Dining Hall ===
The Trojan Dining Hall is a large, two-story, restaurant-style collection of venues. Some of the restaurants inside the dining hall include a Boar's Head Deli, Moe's Southwest Grill, The Wild Mushroom, Bella Trattoria, Flying Star Diner, Basic Kneads Artisan Bakery, and Magellan's.

The hall also features an outdoor dining area with a large fountain.

=== Trojan Center ===
The Trojan Center is the activity center on campus for students. It features a movie theater, meeting rooms, gathering spaces, large ballrooms, the Barnes & Noble campus bookstore, Starbucks, mail room, student activity offices, and a food court that features restaurants such as Chick-fil-A, Steak 'n Shake, Einstein Bros. Bagels, Mein Bowl, Great American Cookies, and Marble Slab Creamery.

=== Recreation ===
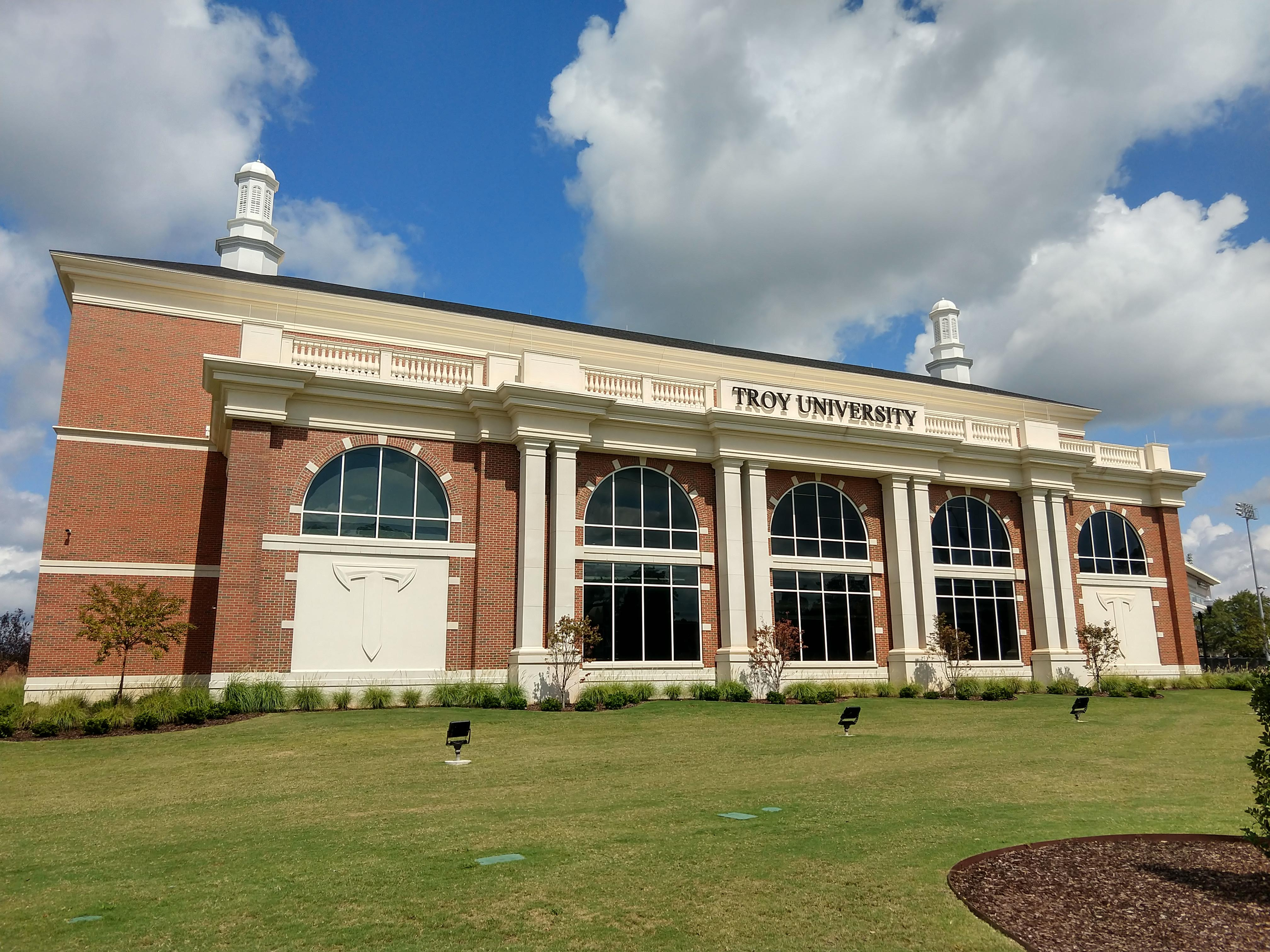
Trojan Fitness & Wellness Center

Many recreational activities are available on campus. The Trojan Fitness Center offers fitness machines, free weights, and cardiovascular machines. Trojan Games recreation room has two billiard tables, two table tennis tables, and a foosball game. The Natatorium houses an eight-lane 25-yard (23 m) Olympic-style pool. The Recreation Center Gym has two basketball courts, a cardio room, a dance room, and a large outside pool. Wright Hall Gym, located adjacent to the Natatorium, offers a basketball court, two volleyball courts, and four badminton courts. The Intramural Fields consist of four flag football fields, two softball fields, and one soccer field.

Trojan Arena, the newest facility on campus, is the home to the basketball, volleyball, and track programs, as well as being used for the university's commencement ceremonies and other special events with seating capacity of 6,000. The new Trojan Arena replaces the university's longtime basketball and events facility, Sartain Hall, which opened in 1962. Trojan Arena is equipped with 5,600 chair-back seats and several VIP suites and boxes. Under the main court is 10,000 square feet (930 m^{2}) of basketball practice space. Beyond the normal concession area is a food court-style lounge and a simulated court area on the concourse. The arena includes seven upper-level suites and an exclusive Stadium Club area for donors, while also adding floor seating for students. Among the latest technology features of the new arena is a three-tiered rotunda at the main entrance, an interior concourse with concession stands, and a food court-styled dining center with various specialty food items. It features an LED ribbon board that panoramically encircles the entire arena with two 767-square-foot (71.3 m^{2}) video boards that enhances the total sports gaming experience, the only one of its kind in the Sun Belt Conference. The Trojan Arena is also home to the Troy University Sports Hall of Fame, with digital displays of its honored members located adjacent to the rotunda.

The campus also features a natatorium that includes a 9-lane, Olympic-sized swimming pool.

The university is currently in the middle of building an exclusive $25 million recreation center for students. The 78,000-square-foot (7,200 m^{2}) facility will be located in the area formerly known as the Sartain Hall parking lot, near George Wallace Drive. Once completed, the building will house a multi-activity court, a basketball court, a free-weight training area, a circuit weight training area, special aerobic rooms, an outdoor swimming pool, a multi-level walking track and four offices.

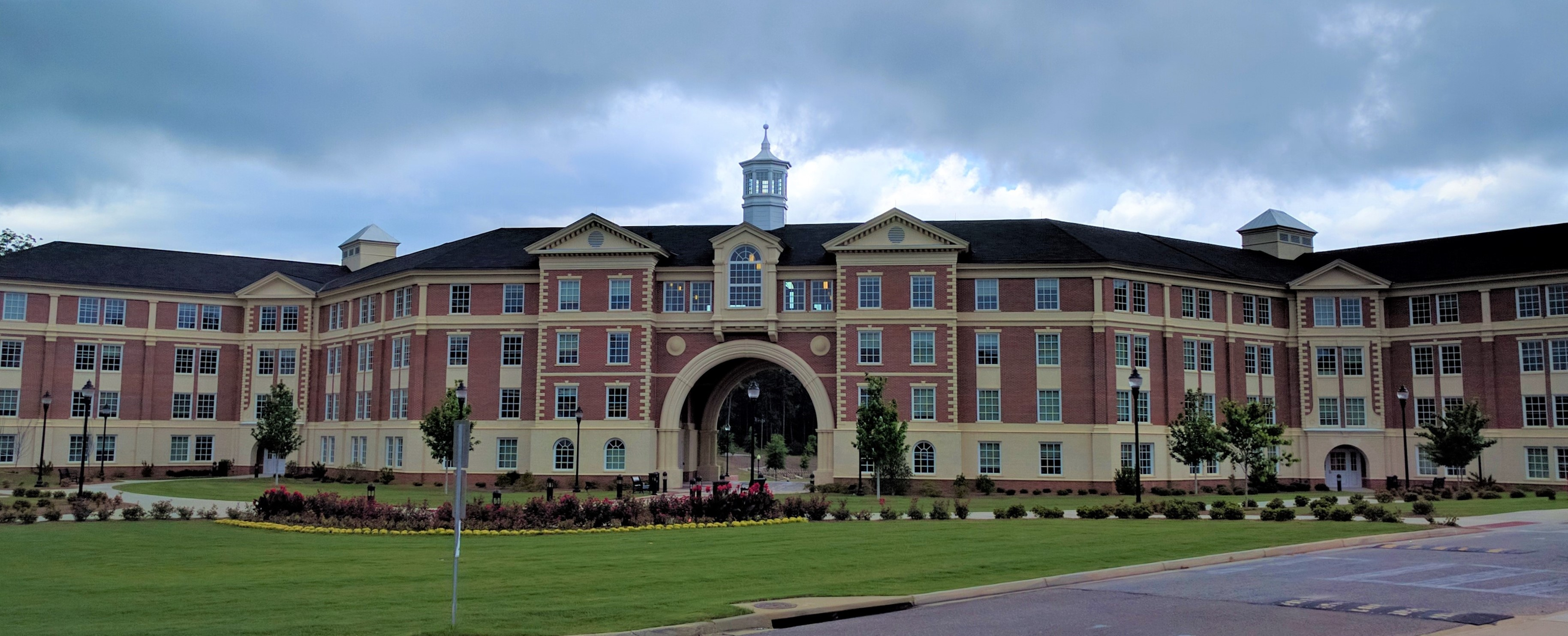
The largest residence hall in the Trojan Village student housing complex

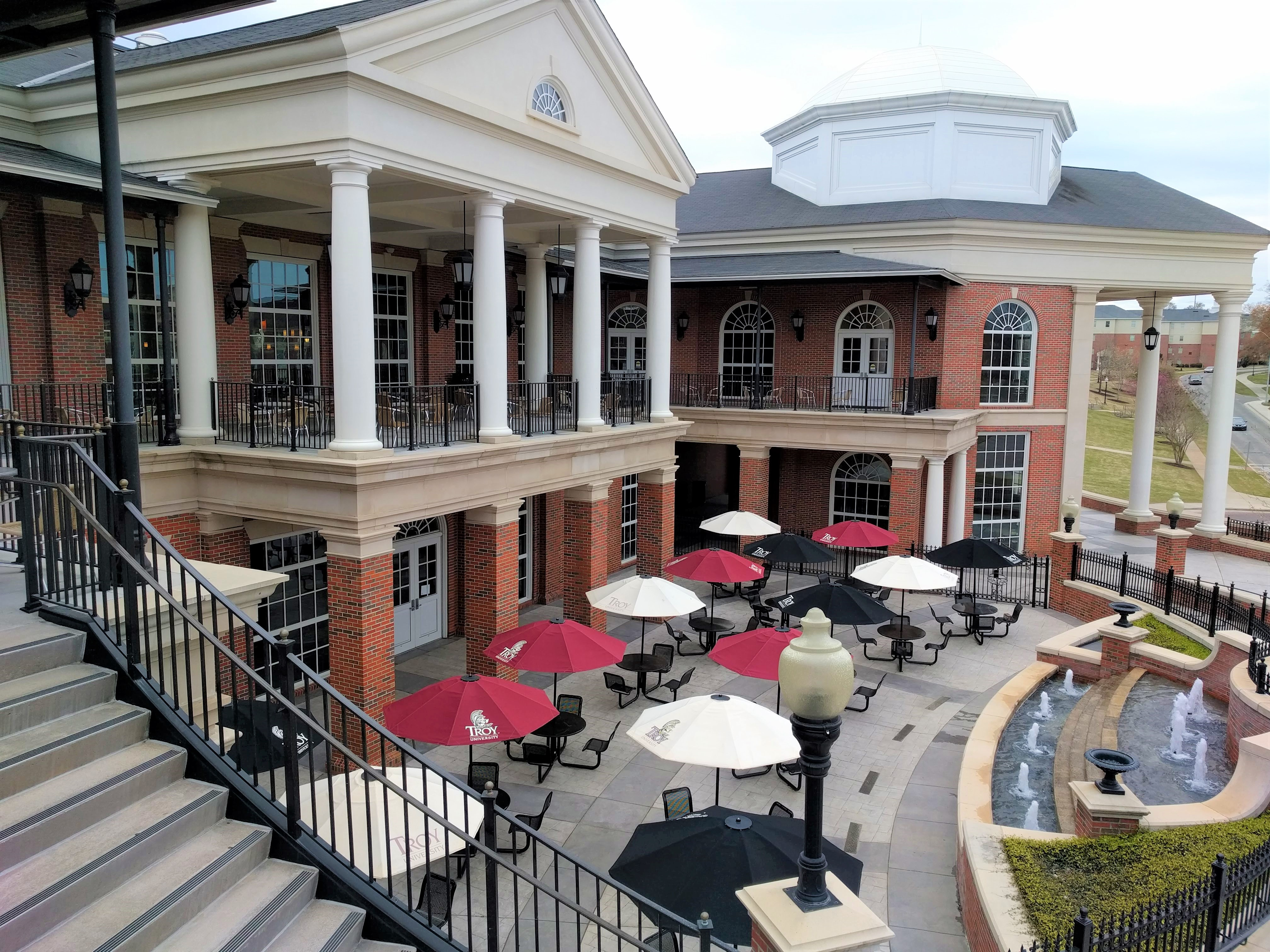
Trojan Dining Hall

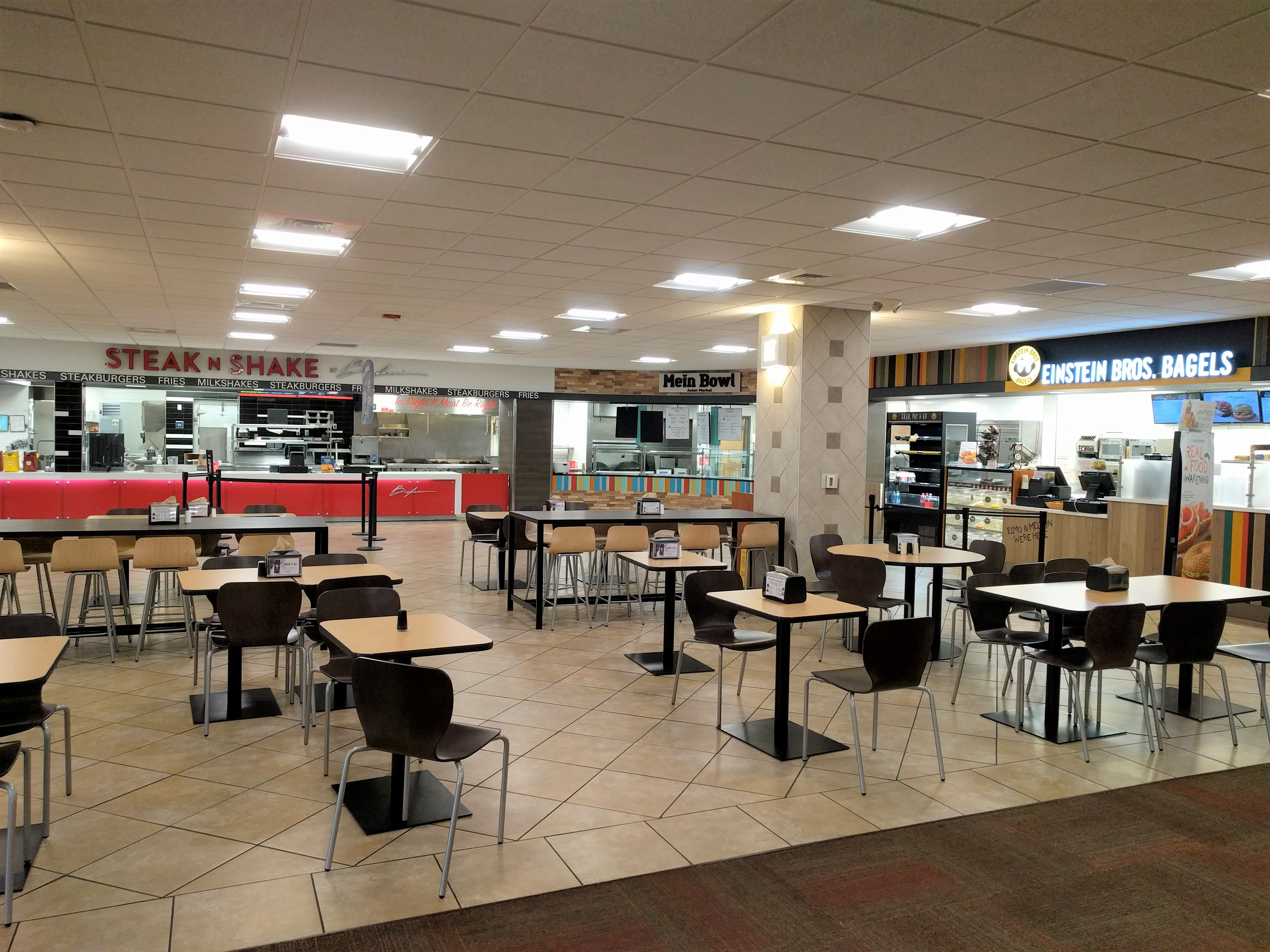
Trojan Center food court

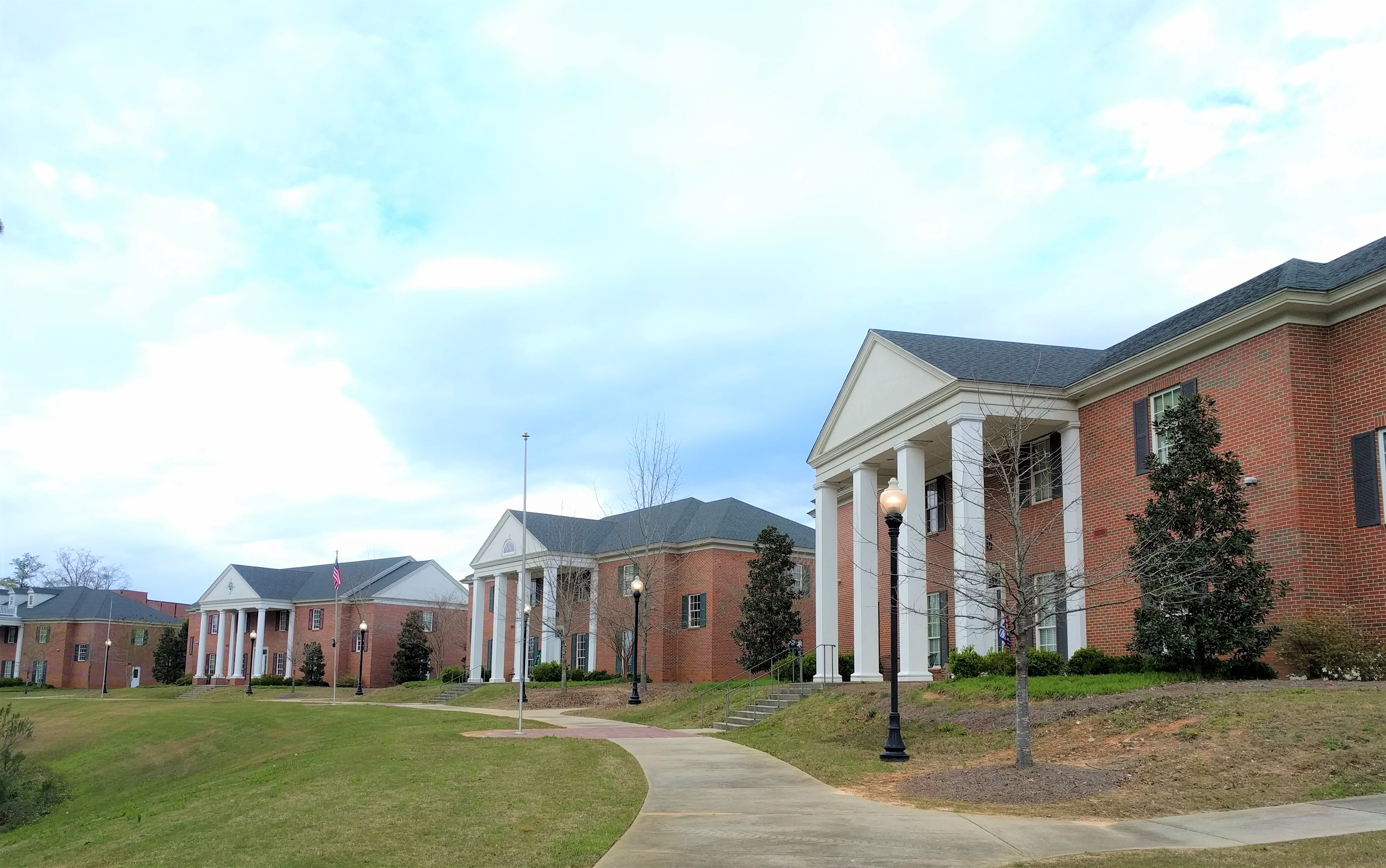
A view of Fraternity Row

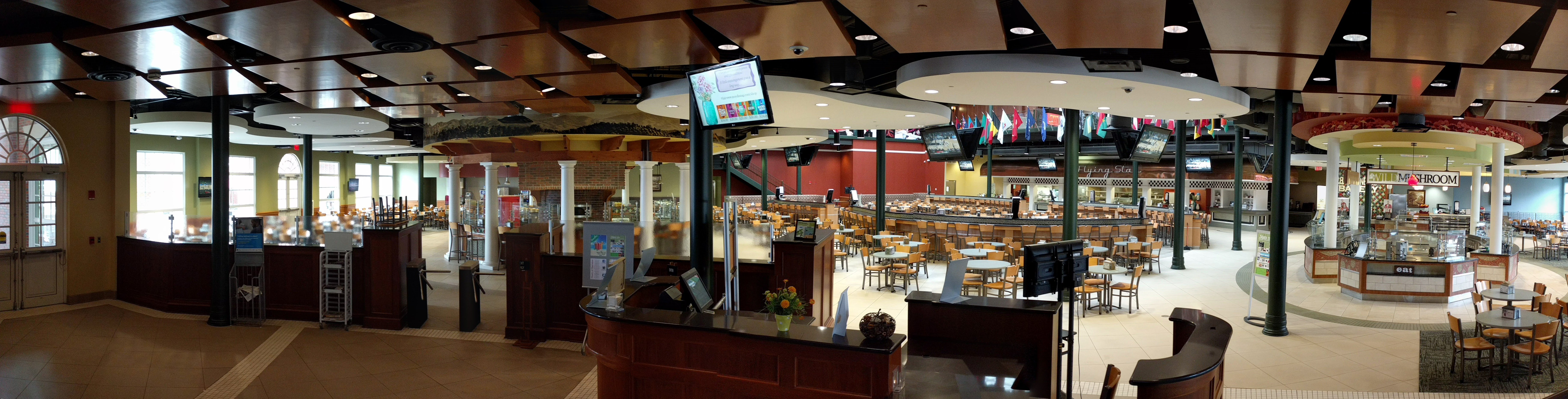
View inside the Trojan Dining Hall

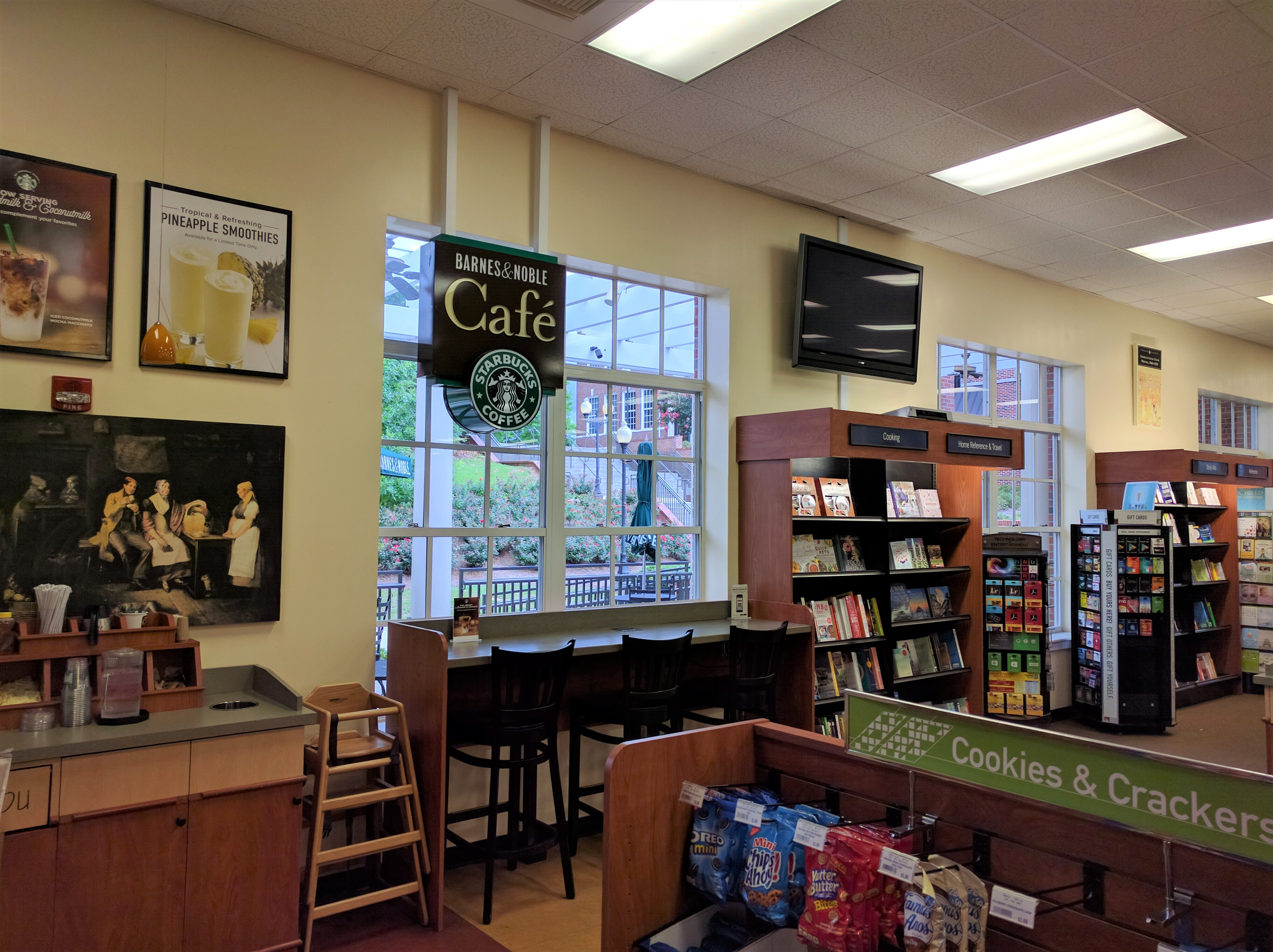
The Barnes & Noble campus bookstore with Starbucks

=== Greek life ===
Twenty-three traditional Greek organizations are on Troy's campus. In 2019, about 10% of undergraduate men and 13% of undergraduate women were active in Troy's Greek system. Troy's IFC and NPC organizations have traditional Greek housing for members use.

=== Music organizations ===
Troy has more than six music organizations that are under the supervision of the John M. Long School of Music: the “Sound of the South” Marching Band, the “Sound of the South” Football and Basketball Pep Bands, the Troy University Symphony Band, the Symphonic Band, the Concert Band, and some ensembles.

=== Student media ===
The school newspaper, the Tropolitan (commonly referred to as "The Trop"), is located on the bottom floor of Wallace Hall. It is a weekly publication, written and produced entirely by students. The Palladium is located in adjacent offices in the same building. The Tropolitan has been ranked as one of the best college newspapers in the country and was ranked as the #6 Best College Newspaper by the Southeast Journalism Conference (SEJC) in 2017.

Also located in Wallace Hall is Troy University Television, also referred to as Troy TrojanVision. Troy University Television broadcasts three live entirely student-produced newscasts twice daily. TrojanVision Global News, TrojanVision Midday & TrojanVision Nightly News. Troy TrojanVision also produces a 30-minute sports show, Trojan Sports Now, every week. TrojanVision streams live online and can be seen at the university's YouTube page. Some of the students that major in broadcasting also help to produce ESPN sporting events for the university, including football, basketball, and baseball games.

in 2017, TrojanVision was ranked as the #1 Best College TV Station by the Southeast Journalism Conference (SEJC).

=== The "Sound of the South" marching band ===
The Sound of the South is the official marching band of Troy University. The marching band was established in 1939 and has been referred to by its current name since 1965. The band was named by John M. Long soon after he was hired as band director. The band, now boasting over 300 members on a regular basis, has enjoyed major success in performing at hundreds of marching band competitions, as well as dozens of different college and professional athletic venues. The band usually follows the football team to almost every away game, and it has a smaller pep-band that plays at every home basketball game. It was during the thirty-two year tenure of Johnny Long, as he was commonly referred to, that the band program at Troy University established a prominent national reputation through its many featured appearances at music conventions, concert tours and recordings with the symphony band, as well as several nationally televised appearances with the "Sound of the South" Marching Band. The band's "trademark" piece that is played before every performance of the band is called "The Fanfare of 1965" and was written by John M. Long in 1965.

== Athletics ==
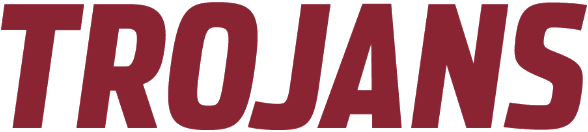
Troy athletics wordmark

Troy State Normal School began its sports program in 1909, when it fielded its first football team. Through the early years, Troy's athletics nicknames were not official and varied by the sport and the coach. Eventually, teams all began to use the name "Troy State Teachers", but when the athletic teams moved into NAIA competition, the nickname was then changed to the "Red Wave". In the early 1970s, the student body voted to change the name to Trojans after many felt that Red Wave was too similar to the University of Alabama's nickname, the Crimson Tide. Prior to becoming a member of NCAA Division I athletics in 1993, Troy University was a member of the Gulf South Conference of the NCAA Division II ranks. Troy's primary rivals were Jacksonville State University, Livingston University (now the University of West Alabama), and the University of North Alabama. In 2004, Troy joined the Sun Belt Conference of the Football Bowl Subdivision.

=== Baseball ===
The Troy University baseball team won two Division II national championships in 1986 and 1987 under the leadership of coach Chase Riddle. One of Troy's biggest victories in baseball came in April 1998 when the Trojans knocked off the #3 nationally ranked University of Alabama Crimson Tide by a score of 8–4 at Riddle-Pace Field on the Troy campus. Under the direction of current head coach Bobby Pierce, the Trojan baseball program has competed in the NCAA Baseball Tournament in 2006 and 2007. Troy also competed in the 1995 and 1997 NCAA Division One tournament under head coach John Mayotte. In 1999, the program tied the NCAA Division I record for most hits in the 6th inning, belting 14 hits (in the 6th) in a 34–4 rout of Stetson.

=== Football ===
Troy University began playing football in 1909. The program has won three national championships, the NAIA national football championship in 1968, and the NCAA Division II national football championship in 1984 and 1987. Troy transitioned to the NCAA's Division I-A in 2001, became a football only member of the Sun Belt Conference in 2004, and joined the conference for all other sports in 2005. In 2001, Troy defeated Mississippi State at Scott Field in Starkville, Mississippi, by a score of 21–9 which was the Trojans' first victory over a BCS level program. In 2004, the Trojans defeated a ranked BCS program for the first time ever, defeating #17 Missouri 24–14 at home on ESPN2. The Trojan football team made its first bowl game appearance in the Silicon Valley Football Classic on December 30, 2004, but lost to Northern Illinois, 34–21. In 2006, Troy won the Sun Belt Conference for the first time after defeating Middle Tennessee State toward the end of the 2006 season.

Troy represented the Sun Belt Conference in the 2006 New Orleans Bowl as the conference champion for the first time where the Trojans defeated the Rice Owls of Conference USA by a score of 41–17. Troy participated in the 2010 New Orleans Bowl where the Trojans routed Ohio by a score of 48–21. Troy has most recently participated in the 2023 Birmingham bowl in Birmingham, Alabama, which the Trojans lost to Duke 10–17. That same year the Trojans became back-to-back Sun Belt Conference champions after beating Appalachian State 49-23 and Costal Carolina the previous year 45-26. The Trojan football team made its first bowl game appearance in the Silicon Valley Football Classic on December 30, 2004, but lost to Northern Illinois, 34–21. In 2006, Troy won the Sun Belt Conference for the first time after defeating Middle Tennessee State toward the end of the 2006 season. Troy represented the Sun Belt Conference in the 2006 New Orleans Bowl as the conference champion for the first time where the Trojans defeated the Rice Owls of Conference USA by a score of 41–17. Troy participated in the 2010 New Orleans Bowl where the Trojans routed Ohio by a score of 48–21. Troy has most recently participated in the 2023 Birmingham bowl in Birmingham, Alabama, which the Trojans lost to Duke 10–17. That same year the Trojans became back-to-back Sun Belt Conference champions after beating Appalachian State 49-23 and Costal Carolina the previous year 45-26.

Former Troy football head coach Larry Blakeney served 25 seasons as head coach between 1990 and the end of the 2014 season. He has led the program to three Southland Football Conference titles and five Sun Belt Conference titles, as well as guided the Trojans to seven FCS playoff appearances and five FBS bowl games. Blakeney boasts an overall record of 178–113–1 as head coach at Troy. Blakeney is the winningest coach in the Troy University history and he is the 4th-winningest collegiate coach all time in the state of Alabama, only behind Paul "Bear" Bryant, Cleve Abbott, and Ralph "Shug" Jordan. Blakeney is one of two coaches in college football history to be the head coach of a football program during its transition from Division II to I-A (the other being UCF's Gene McDowell).

=== Rodeo ===
The program's governing body is the National Intercollegiate Rodeo Association. The rodeo program's home facility is the Pike County Cattlemen's Arena in Troy where it hosts a three-day rodeo each October that features college rodeo programs from throughout the southern region of the United States. Troy University calf roper Ben Mayworth won the 2007 national title in Casper, Wyoming, at the National Finals Collegiate Rodeo.

== Campus academic features ==
=== Hall of Fame of Distinguished Band Conductors ===
The Hall of Fame of Distinguished Band Conductors was established on the campus of what was then known as Troy State University in Troy, Alabama by the National Band Association in 1979. The Hall of Fame contains the picture and biographies of band directors who have distinguished themselves in some way or who have made significant contributions to the field of band directing, conducting, or leadership.

=== The Manuel H. Johnson Center for Political Economy ===
Troy University's Manuel H. Johnson Center for Political Economy was formed in September, 2010 as the result of a $3.6 million gift from Troy alumnus Dr. Manuel H. Johnson, BB&T, and the Charles G. Koch Charitable Foundation. The center's mission is the advancement of free market economic ideas and its research and teaching efforts explore the idea that economic freedom improves the quality of life for citizens. The new center is part of the university's Sorrell College of Business and it is housed inside Bibb Graves Hall. Dr. Scott Beaulier served as the center's executive director from 2010 to 2015.

=== University libraries ===
The libraries on the Dothan, Montgomery, and Troy campuses house collections of more than 300,000 volumes, hundreds of thousands of eBooks, and over 250 databases. The Troy University Library on the Troy campus is a Federal Depository Library.

=== Janice Hawkins Cultural Arts Park ===
The Janice Hawkins Cultural Arts Park is a 23-acre (9.3 ha) park on the Troy University campus that features an amphitheater, walking trails, a lagoon and the International Arts Center, which houses two art galleries and an interpretive center known as Warriors Unearthed. In addition, there are 200 replica terracotta warriors designed by the artist Huo Bao Zhu that are displayed throughout the park in exhibits representing the historic excavations in China. It is built in the honor of Mrs. Janice Hawkins.

=== Center for Materials and Manufacturing Sciences ===
The university was awarded a $3.2 million grant from NIST in 2018 to establish the Center for Materials and Manufacturing Sciences, a facility for research in recycling of plastic materials. The establishment of the center will facilitate and enhance Troy University's partnership with the local plastic recycling industry in order to increase competitiveness in the marketplace. This will assist in improving and increasing job creation in Pike County. The assistance of Senator Shelby (R-Ala) was instrumental in obtaining the funding for this venture.

== Notable alumni ==
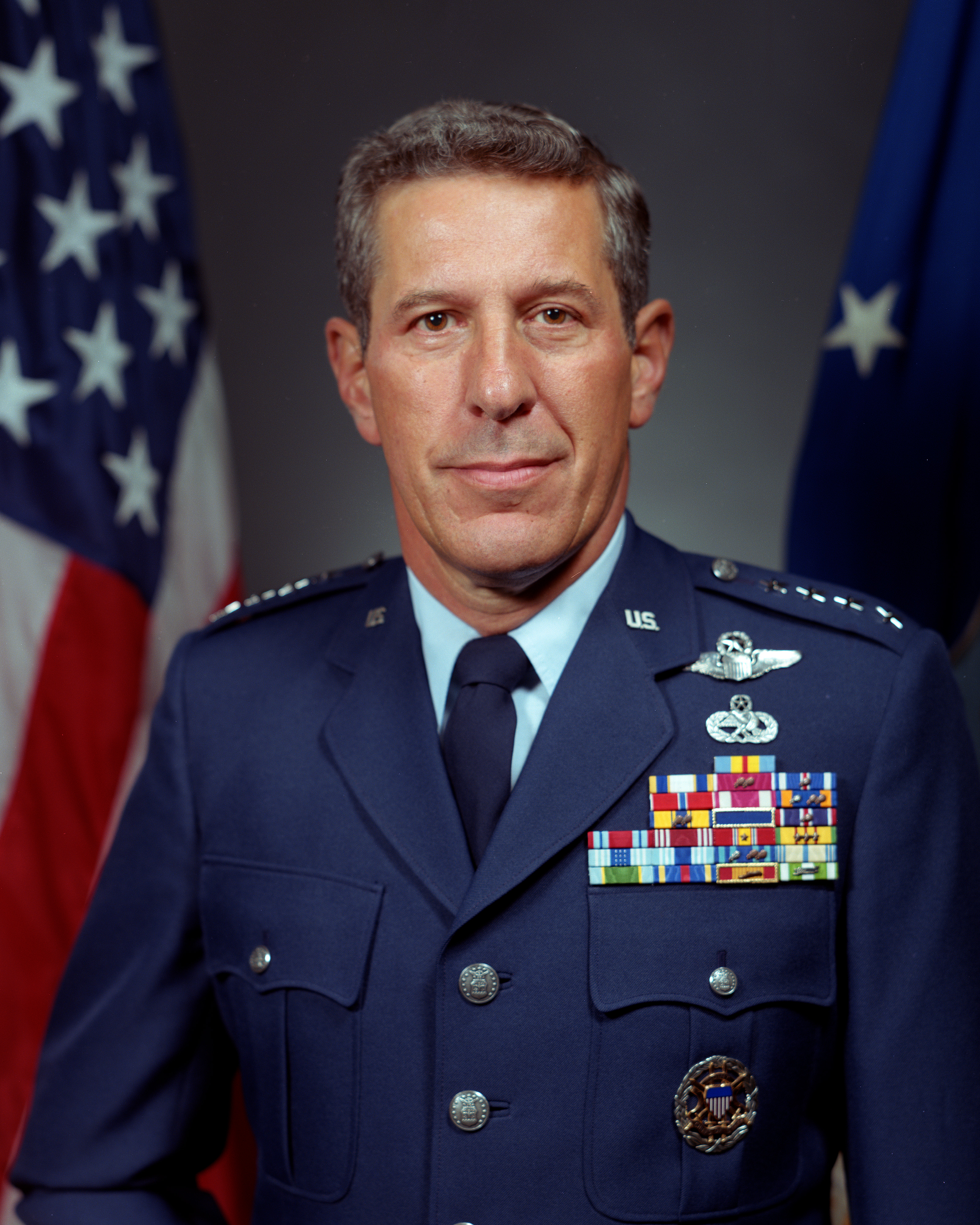
Alfred G. Hansen, 1972

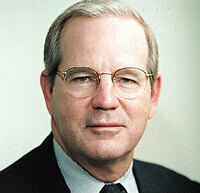
Manuel H. Johnson, 1973

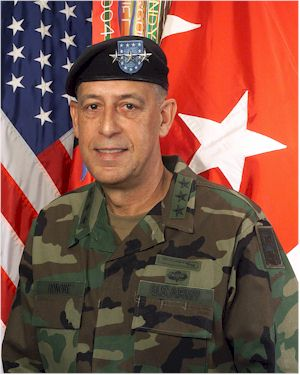
Russel L. Honoré

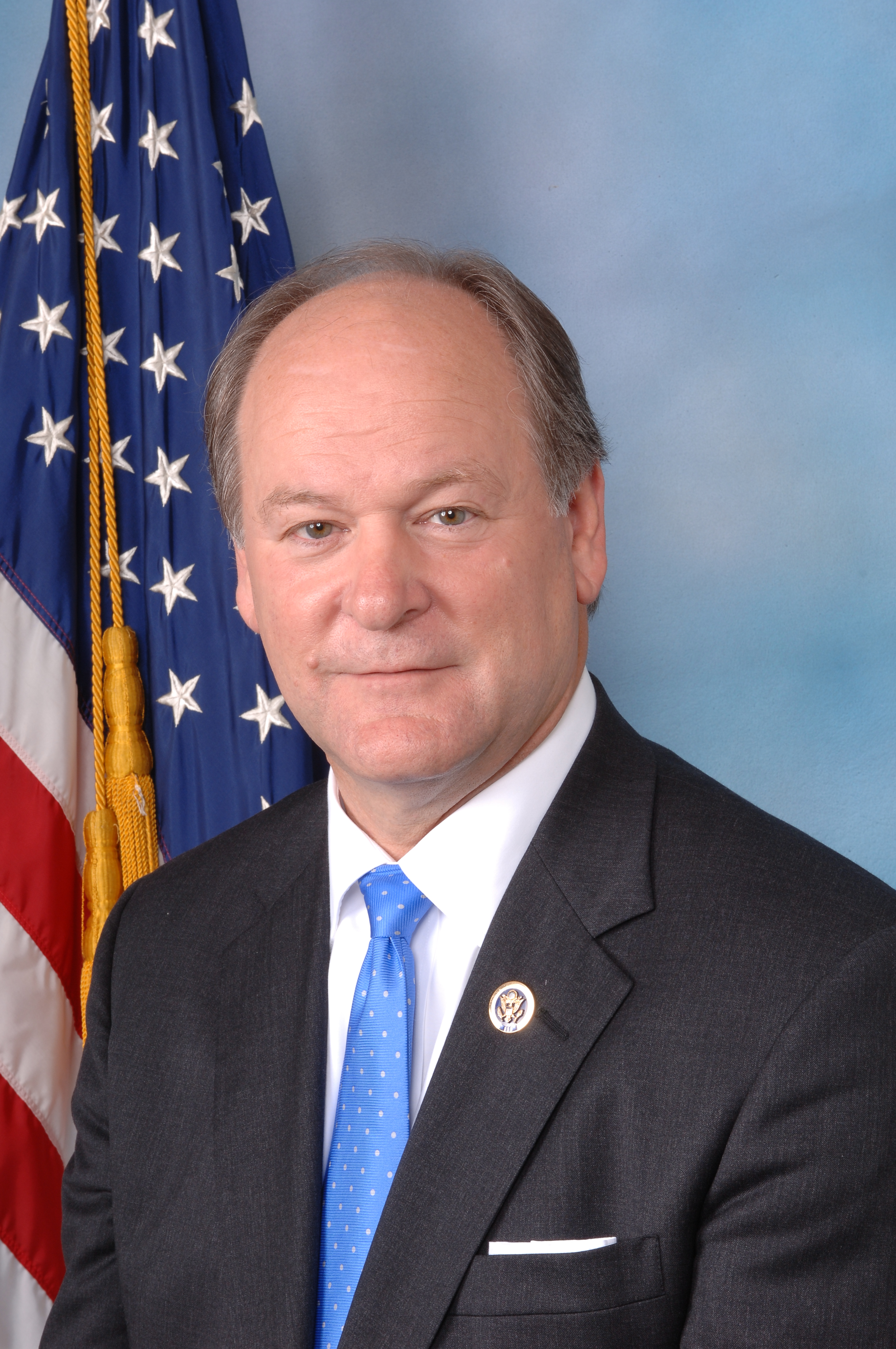
Bobby Bright, 1977

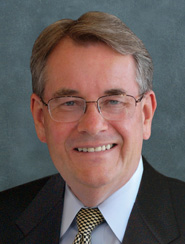
Don Gaetz

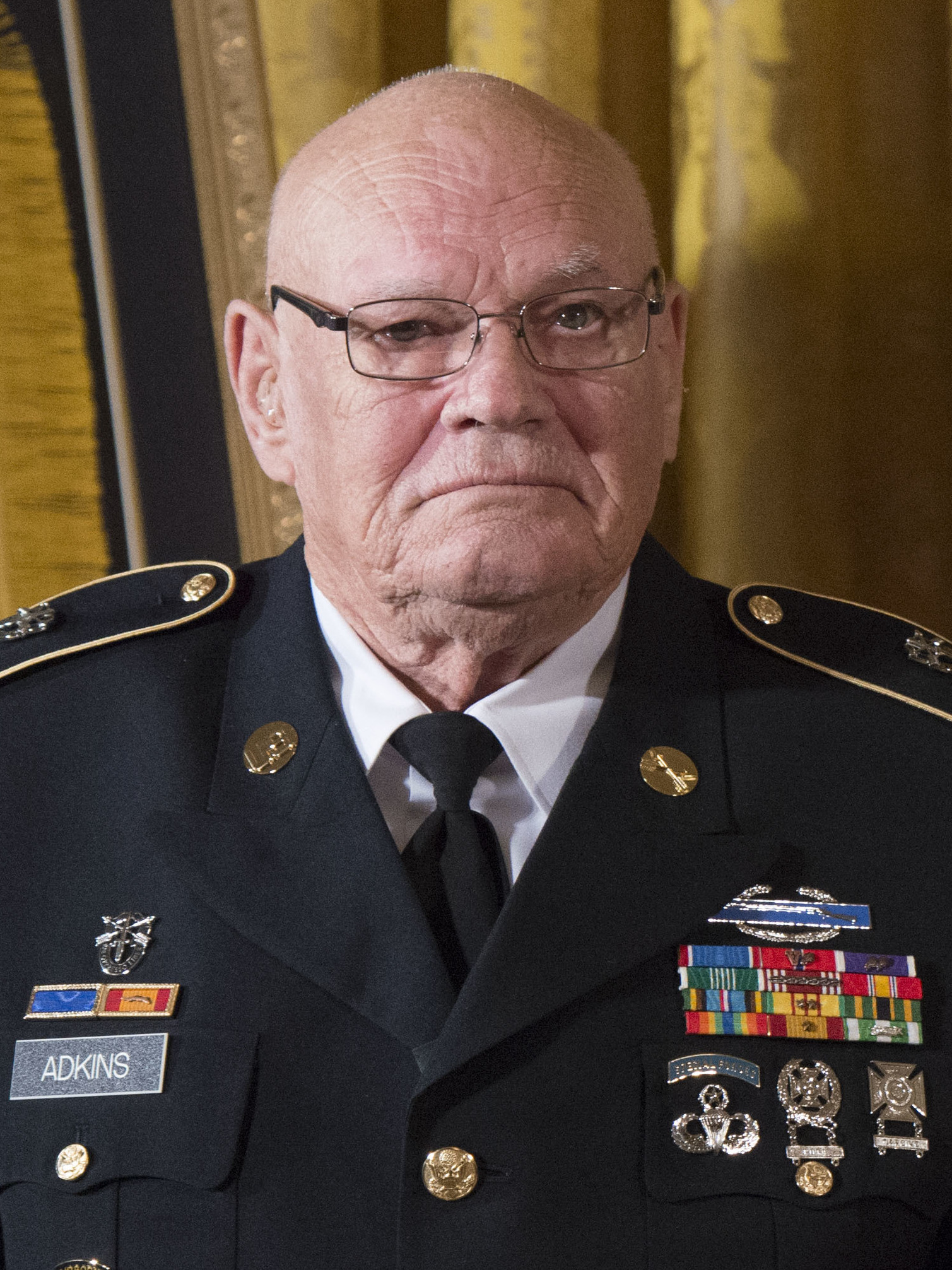
Bennie G. Adkins, 1979

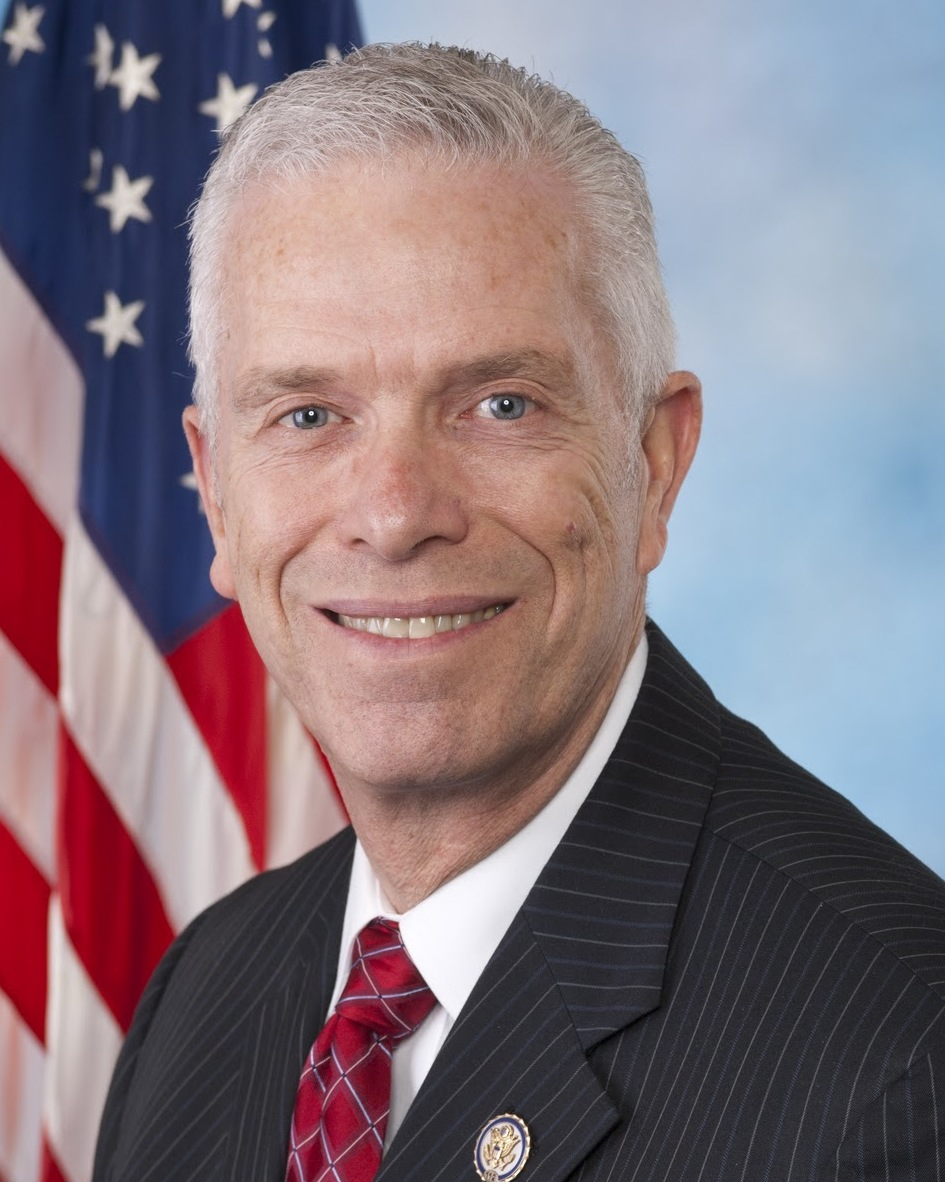
Bill Johnson, 1979

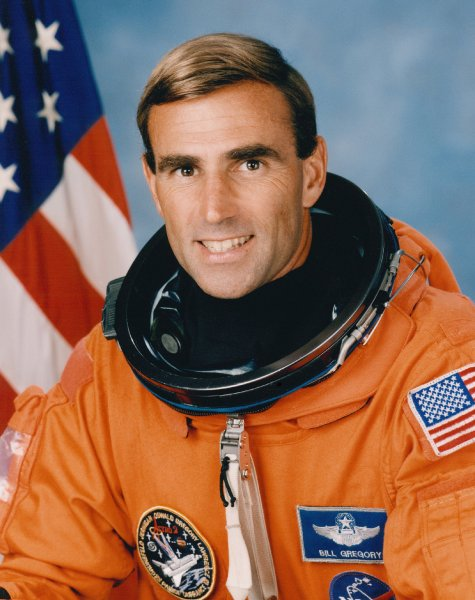
William G. Gregory, 1984

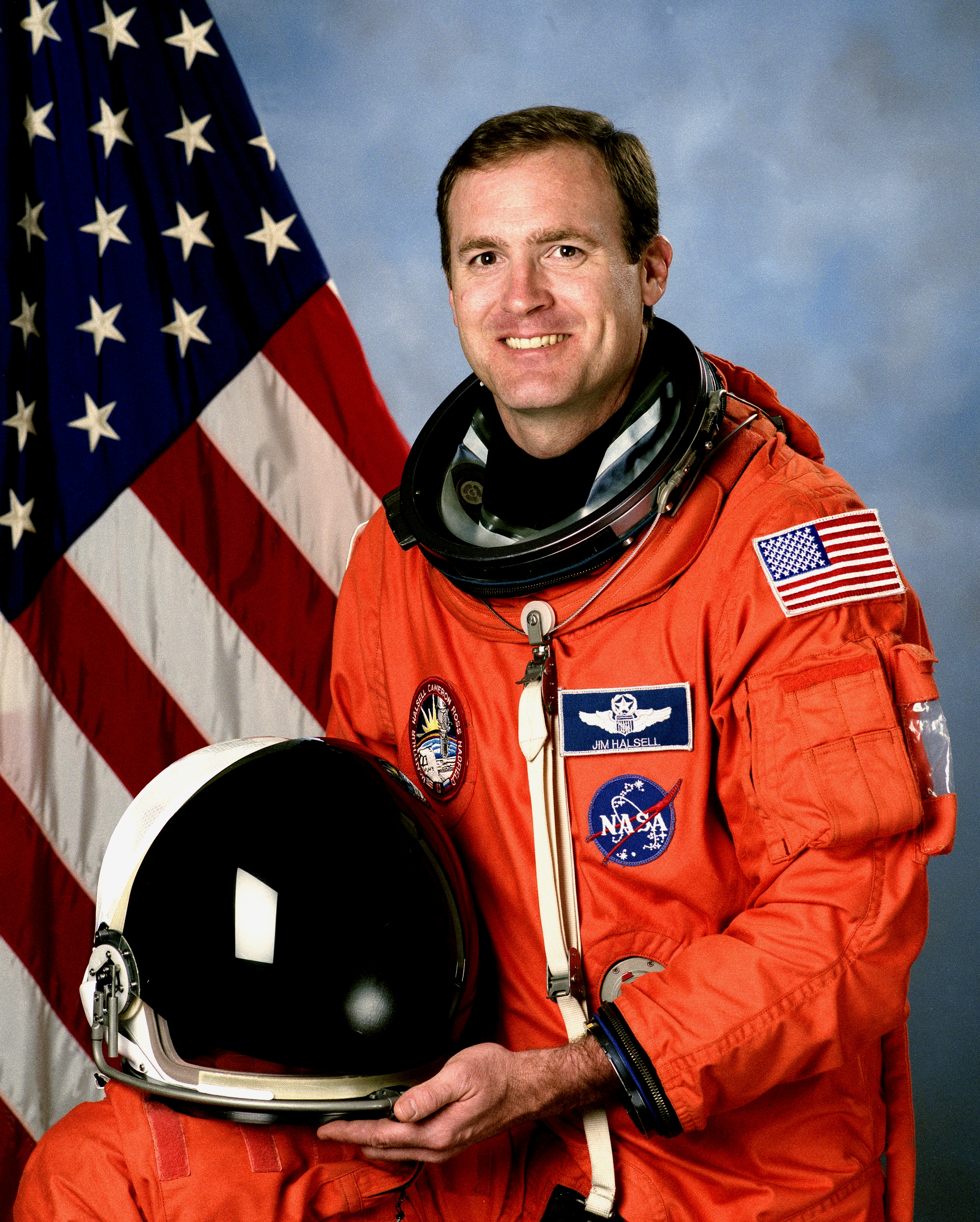
James D. Halsell, 1983

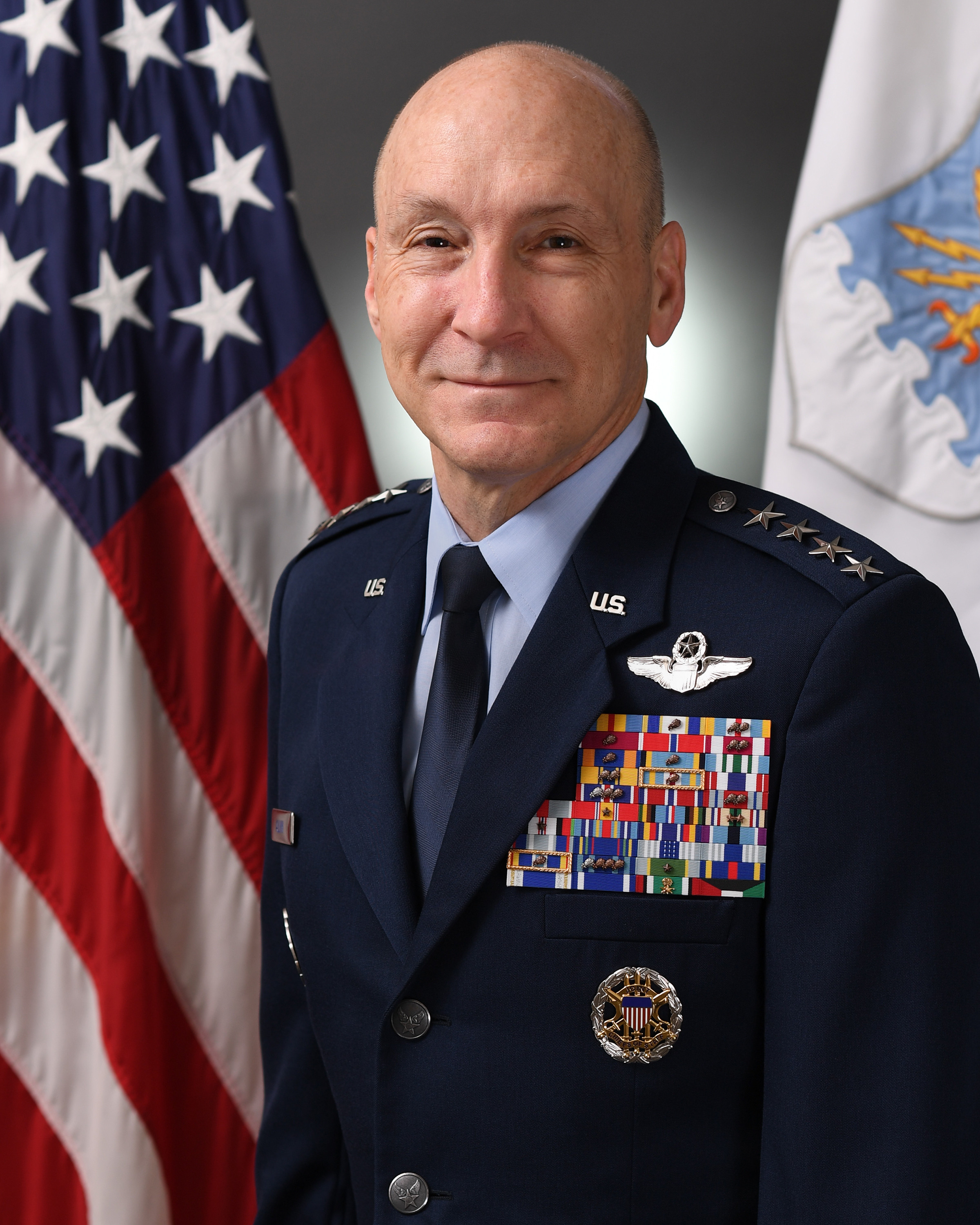
David W. Allvin, 1989

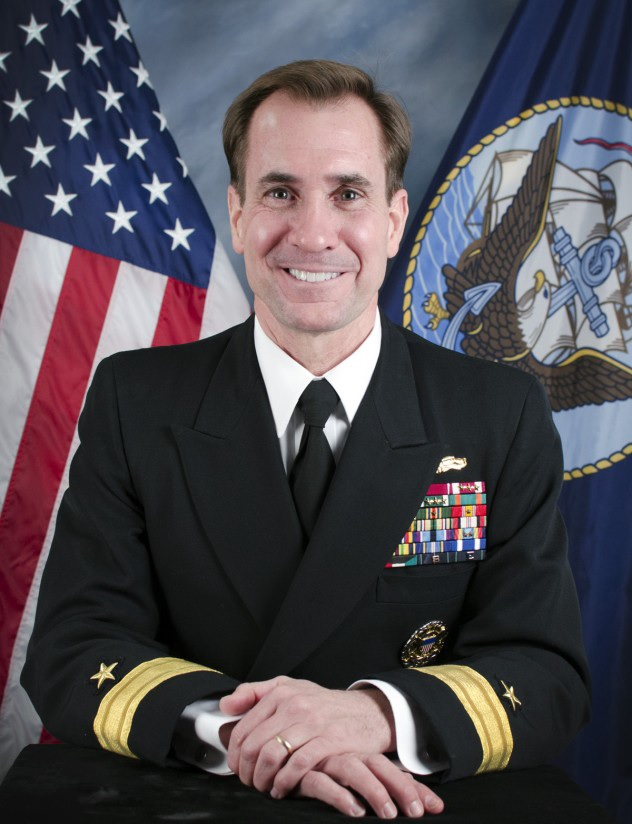
John Kirby

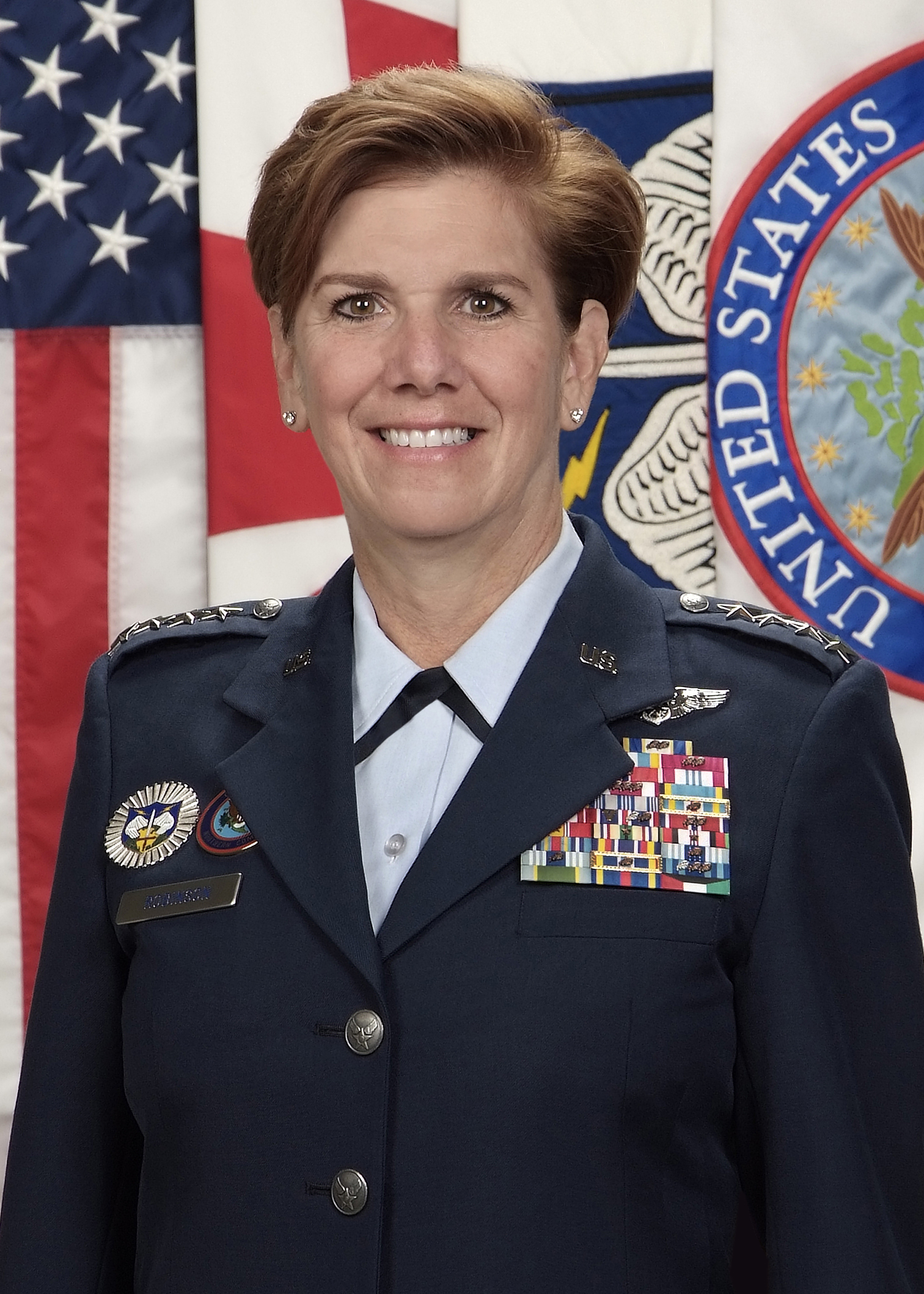
Lori Robinson, 1992

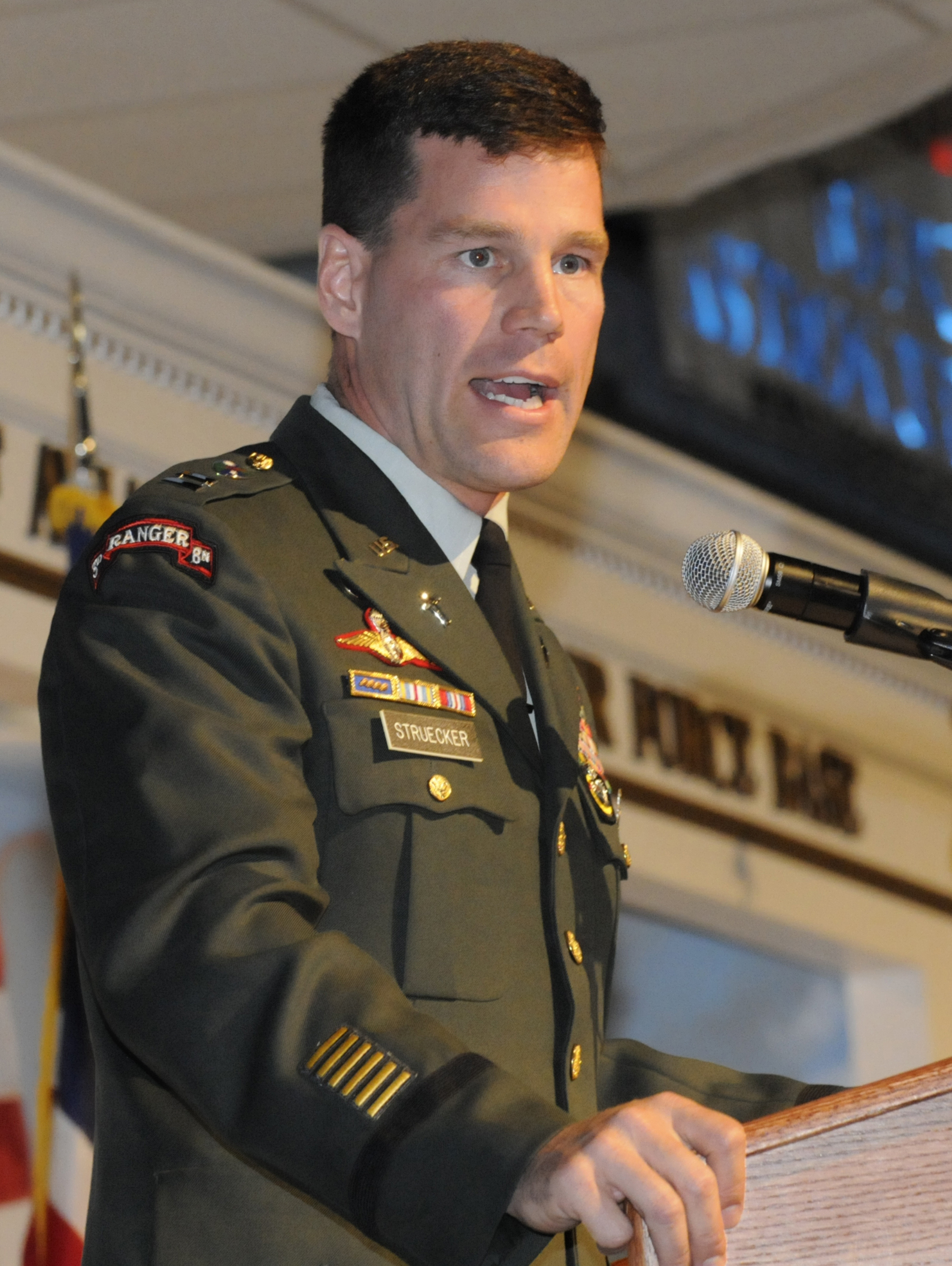
Jeff Struecker

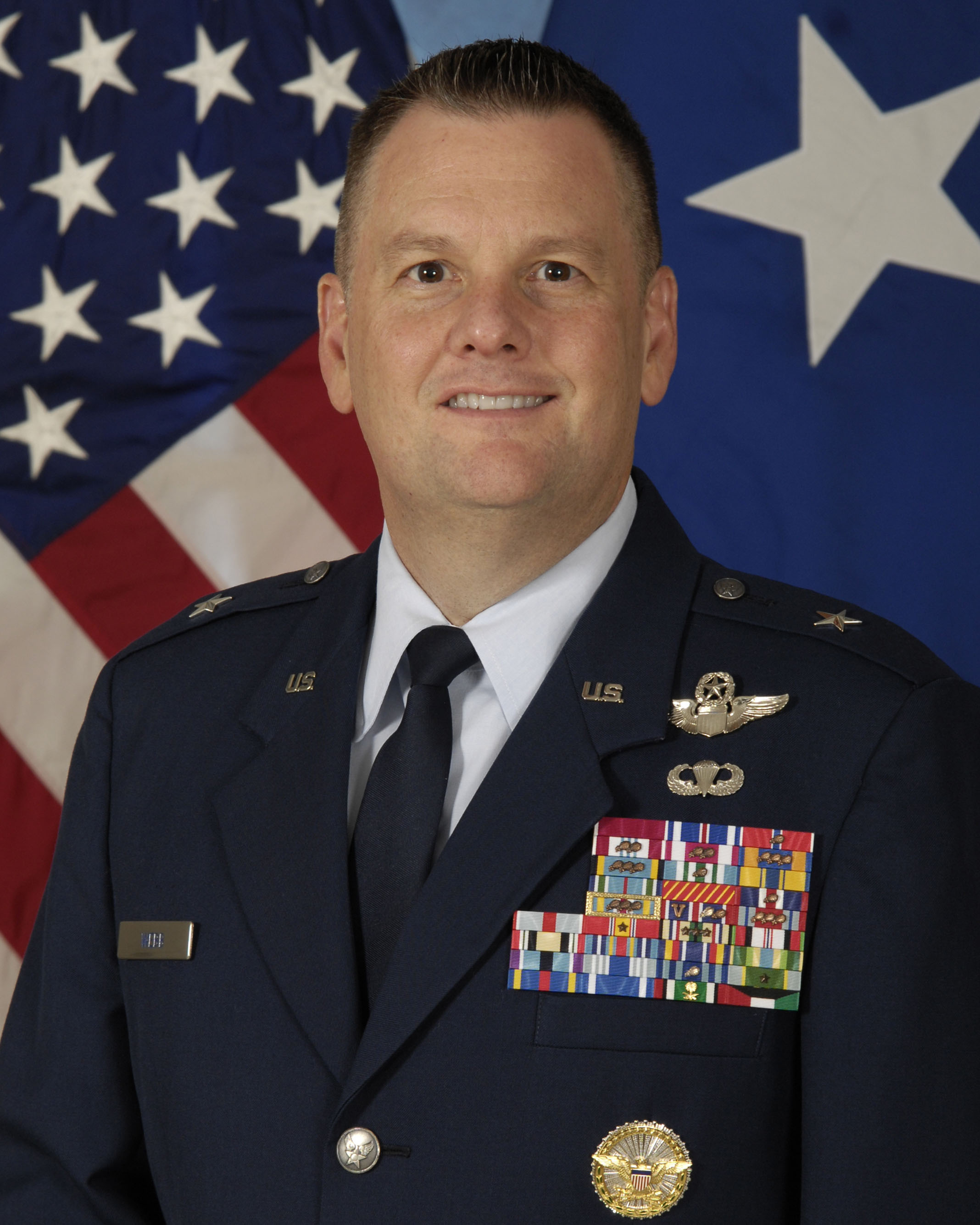
Marshall B. Webb, 1994

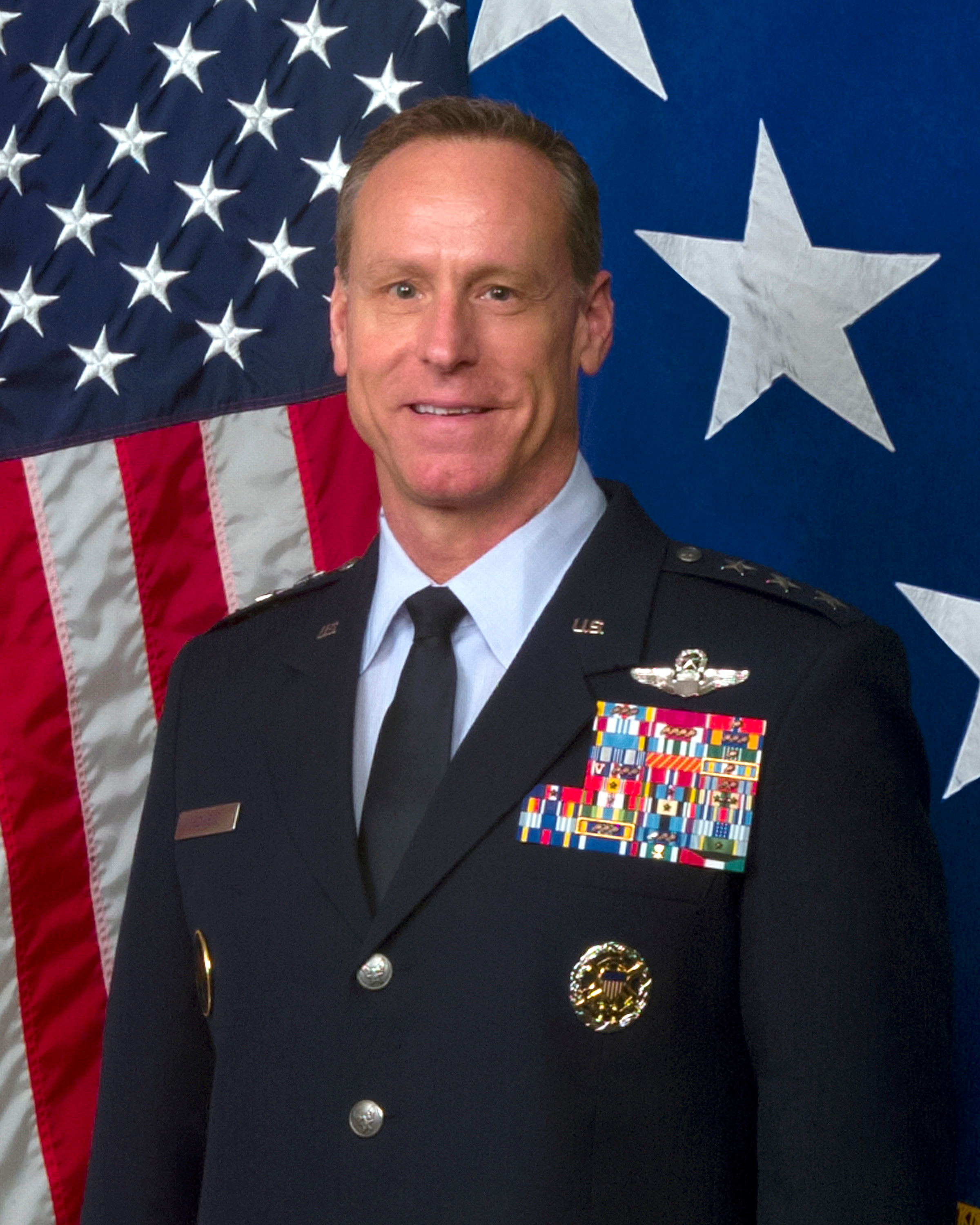
Scott A. Howell, 1995

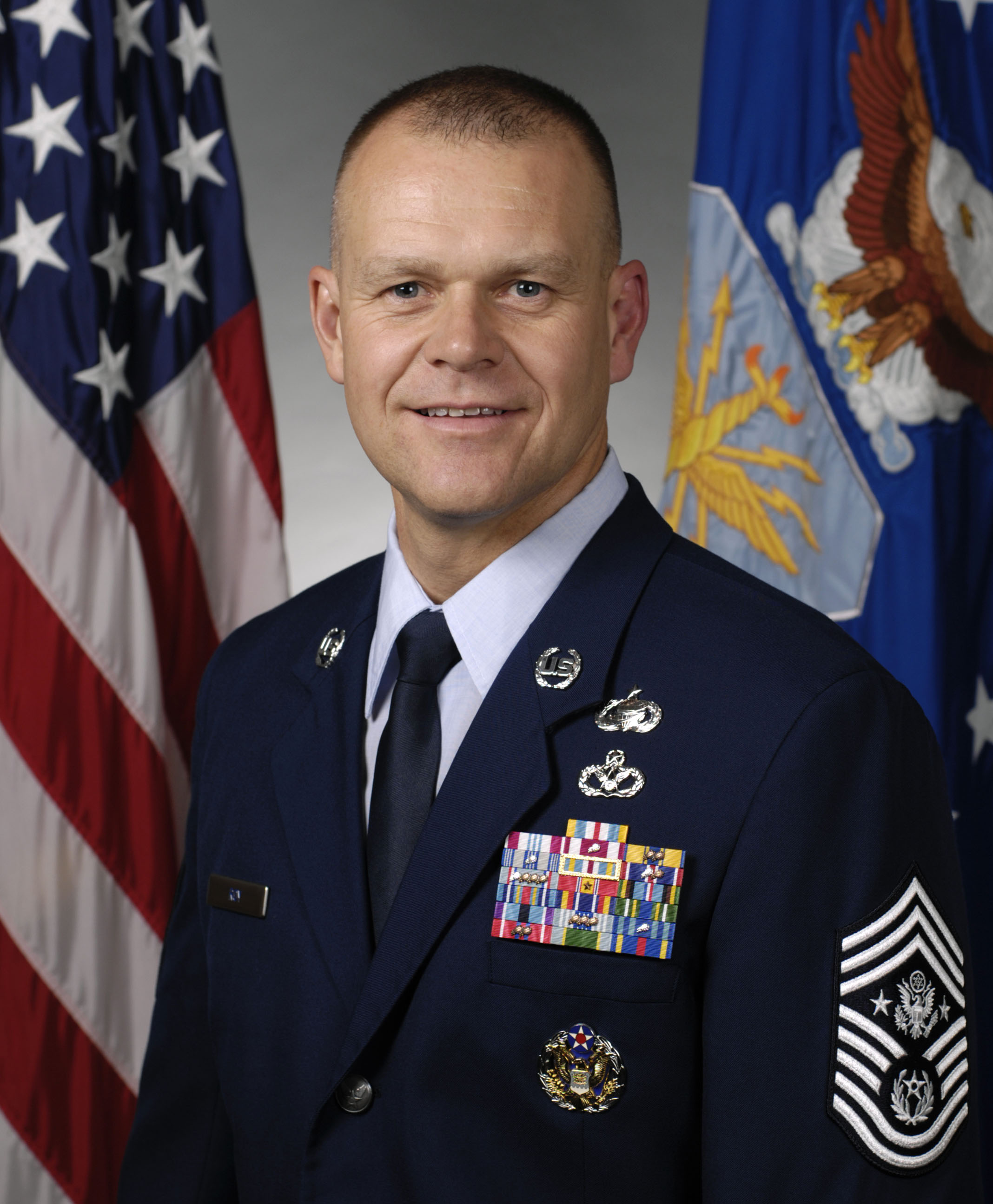
James A. Roy, 2000
