= Troy University at Phenix City =

Satellite college campus in Phenix City, Alabama, US

- Former name: Troy State University at Phenix City
- Type: Public university, Master's university
- Established: 1975
- Affiliations: Troy University
- Chancellor: Dr. Jack Hawkins, Jr.
- Vice-Chancellor: Dr. David White
- Students: 885
- Location: Phenix City, Alabama, United States
- Website: https://www.troy.edu/about-us/phenix-city-campus/

Troy University at Phenix City is a satellite campus of Troy University and is located in Phenix City, Alabama, United States. On March 1, 2025, the Troy University Board of Trustees voted to close the campus by December 31, 2025.

== Academics ==
=== Schools/Colleges ===
The university is composed of five colleges, a graduate school, and a division of general studies:

- College of Arts & Sciences
- College of Communications & Fine Arts
- College of Education
- College of Health & Human Services
- The Sorrell College of Business
- The Graduate School
- The Division of General Studies

== Rankings and Reputation ==
Troy University has acquired different institutional rankings from various sources:

- In 2017, Forbes ranked Troy as the 640th best school in the nation. Forbes' overall ranking centers on the value of the degree obtained by a university's students and measures, in part, the marketplace success of a school's graduate.
- U.S. News & World Report in several categories for 2018:

Category	Rank
Regional University	#65
Top Public Schools	#27
Best Online Graduate Business Program (Excluding MBA)	#117
Best Online Graduate Education Program	#136
Best Online MBA Program	#172
Most Innovative Schools	#14
Best Online Graduate Nursing Program	#118-#154
