= List of Delta Mu Delta chapters =

Delta Mu Delta is an international honor society that recognizes academic excellence in administration programs at institutions recognized by the Association of Collegiate Business Schools and Programs. In the following list of chapters, active chapters are indicated in bold and inactive chapters are in italics.

| Chapter | Charter date and range | Institution | City | State, province, or country | Status | Notes |
|---|---|---|---|---|---|---|
| Alpha | 1920–1960 | University of Pittsburgh | Pittsburgh | Pennsylvania | Inactive | |
| Beta | 1924–1970 | Northwestern University | Evanston | Illinois | Inactive | |
| Gamma | 1926 | University of Cincinnati | Cincinnati | Ohio | Inactive | |
| Delta | 1927–1968 | St. John's University | New York City | New York | Inactive | |
| **Epsilon** | September 1, 1992 | Bucknell University | Lewisburg | Pennsylvania | Active | |
| Zeta | 1948 | Baldwin–Wallace College | Berea | Ohio | Inactive | |
| **Eta** | September 9, 1954 | DePaul University | Chicago | Illinois | Active | |
| Theta | 1954–1960 | Georgia State University | Atlanta | Georgia | Inactive | |
| Iota | 1961–1970 | University of Memphis | Memphis | Tennessee | Inactive | |
| **Kappa** | April 24, 1963 | Lincoln University of Missouri | Jefferson City | Missouri | Active | |
| **Lambda** | March 16, 1963 | Elmhurst University | Elmhurst | Illinois | Active | |
| Mu | 1964–1982 | Texas Southern University | Houston | Texas | Inactive | |
| Nu | 1964 | LIU Post | Brookville | New York | Inactive | |
| Xi | 1964–1973 | Atlanta University | Atlanta | Georgia | Inactive | |
| Omicron | 1966–1974 | Kansas State University | Manhattan | Kansas | Inactive | |
| Pi | 1966–1988 | Iona University | New Rochelle | New York | Inactive | |
| Rho | 1966 | Ithaca College | Ithaca | New York | Inactive | |
| Sigma | 1960 | Quinnipiac University | Hamden | Connecticut | Inactive | |
| Tau | 1967 | Eastern Illinois University | Charleston | Illinois | Inactive | |
| **Upsilon** | March 3, 1967 | Roanoke College | Salem | Virginia | Active | |
| Phi | 1967–1984 | Middle Tennessee State University | Murfreesboro | Tennessee | Inactive | |
| Chi | 1968 | Pittsburg State University | Pittsburg | Kansas | Inactive | |
| **Psi** | 1968 | Chaminade University of Honolulu | Honolulu | Hawaii | Inactive | |
| Omega | 1968 | University of Scranton | Scranton | Pennsylvania | Inactive | |
| **Alpha Alpha** | May 27, 1969 | West Liberty University | West Liberty | West Virginia | Active | |
| **Alpha Beta** | January 13, 1970 | Wagner College | Staten Island | New York | Active | |
| **Alpha Gamma** | April 5, 1970 | Andrews University | Berrien Springs | Michigan | Active | |
| Alpha Delta | 1970–1982 | Kansas Wesleyan University | Salina | Kansas | Inactive | |
| Alpha Epsilon | 1970 | South Carolina State University | Orangeburg | South Carolina | Inactive | |
| Alpha Zeta | 1970 | Western New England University | Springfield | Massachusetts | Inactive | |
| Alpha Eta | 1970 | Bryant University | Smithfield | Rhode Island | Inactive | |
| **Alpha Theta** | May 11, 1970 | West Virginia Wesleyan College | Buckhannon | West Virginia | Active | |
| **Alpha Iota** | May 1, 1970 – 1982; 1983 | Athens State University | Athens | Alabama | Active | |
| Alpha Kappa | 1970 | Manhattan College | Bronx, New York City | New York | Inactive | |
| **Alpha Lambda** | October 28, 1970 | William Jewell College | Liberty | Missouri | Active | |
| **Alpha Mu** | December 7, 1970 | High Point University | High Point | North Carolina | Active | |
| **Alpha Nu** | February 2, 1970 | North Park University | Chicago | Illinois | Active | |
| **Alpha Xi** | March 17, 1971 | New York Institute of Technology HQ | New York City | New York | Active | |
| **Alpha Xi** | June 7, 2011 | New York Institute of Technology Canada | Vancouver | British Columbia | Active | |
| Alpha Omicron | 1971 | Jackson State University | Jackson | Mississippi | Inactive | |
| Alpha Pi | May 6, 1961 | Nichols College | Dudley | Massachusetts | Active | |
| Alpha Rho | 1971 | Delaware State University | Dover | Delaware | Inactive | |
| **Alpha Sigma** | May 19, 1971 | Alabama A&M University | Normal | Alabama | Active | |
| Alpha Tau | 1971 | Minnesota State University Moorhead | Moorhead | Minnesota | Inactive | |
| **Alpha Upsilon** | May 2, 1971 | Harding University | Searcy | Arkansas | Active | |
| Alpha Phi | 1971 | Northern Michigan University | Marquette | Michigan | Inactive | |
| Alpha Chi | 1971–1984 | California State University, East Bay | Hayward | California | Inactive | |
| Alpha Psi | April 20, 1972 | Slippery Rock University | Slippery Rock | Pennsylvania | Inactive | |
| **Alpha Omega** | April 6, 1973 | Saint Augustine's College | Raleigh | North Carolina | Active | |
| Beta Alpha | 1972 | Tuskegee University | Tuskegee | Alabama | Inactive | |
| **Beta Beta** | March 29, 1973 | Grove City College | Grove City | Pennsylvania | Active | |
| **Beta Gamma** | March 31, 1973 | Benedict College | Columbia | South Carolina | Active | |
| Beta Delta | 1973 | Western Connecticut State University | Danbury | Connecticut | Inactive | |
| **Beta Epsilon** | May 5, 1973 | Alfred University | Alfred | New York | Active | |
| Beta Zeta | 1973–1982, 1988 | Prairie View A&M University | Prairie View | Texas | Inactive | |
| Beta Eta | 1973 | Bloomsburg University | Bloomsburg | Pennsylvania | Inactive | |
| Beta Theta | 1973 | Daemen University | Amherst | New York | Inactive | |
| **Beta Kappa** | February 13, 1973 | St. Edward's University | Austin | Texas | Active | |
| Beta Lambda | 1974 | Lewis & Clark College | Portland | Oregon | Inactive | |
| Beta Mu | 1974 | Grand Valley State University | Allendale | Michigan | Inactive | |
| Beta Nu | 1974 | Nichols College | Dudley | Massachusetts | Inactive | |
| Beta Xi | 1974 | Adelphi University | Garden City | New York | Inactive | |
| **Beta Omicron** | February 19, 1975 | Franklin College | Franklin | Indiana | Active | |
| **Beta Pi** | April 29, 1975 | Mount St. Mary's University | Emmitsburg | Maryland | Active | |
| **Beta Rho** | April 11, 1975 | Delta State University | Cleveland | Mississippi | Active | |
| **Beta Sigma** | December 9, 1975 | Salem State University | Salem | Massachusetts | Active | |
| **Beta Tau** | May 18, 1975 | Wartburg College | Waverly | Iowa | Active | |
| **Beta Upsilon** | May 16, 1975 | Mercy College | Dobbs Ferry | New York | Active | |
| Beta Phi (First) | 1976 | Tennessee State University | Nashville | Tennessee | Inactive, Reassigned | |
| Beta Phi (Second) | February 22, 1994 | University of North Alabama | Florence | Alabama | Inactive | |
| Beta Chi | 1976 | Radford University | Radford | Virginia | Inactive | |
| **Beta Psi** | April 9, 1975 | Central Methodist University | Fayette | Missouri | Active | |
| Beta Omega | 1976 | Pace University | Westchester | New York | Inactive | |
| Gamma Alpha | 1978 | Suffolk University | Boston | Massachusetts | Inactive | |
| Gamma Beta | 1976 | Fayetteville State University | Fayetteville | North Carolina | Inactive | |
| Gamma Gamma | 1977 | Stonehill College | Easton | Massachusetts | Inactive | |
| **Gamma Delta** | May 5, 1977 | Mount Vernon Nazarene University | Mount Vernon | Ohio | Active | |
| **Gamma Epsilon** | November 11, 1977 | Alabama State University | Montgomery | Alabama | Active | |
| **Gamma Zeta** | March 18, 1977 | Anderson University | Anderson | South Carolina | Active | |
| **Gamma Eta** | April 30, 1977 | Walsh College | Troy | Michigan | Active | |
| **Gamma Theta** | May 11, 1977 | Trine University | Angola | Indiana | Active | |
| **Gamma Kappa** | December 9, 1977 | Bowie State University | Bowie | Maryland | Active | |
| Gamma Lambda | 1978 | Fairleigh Dickinson University | Rutherford | New Jersey | Inactive | |
| Gamma Mu | 1978 | Morgan State University | Baltimore | Maryland | Inactive | |
| **Gamma Nu** | April 7, 1978 | Southern New Hampshire University | Manchester | New Hampshire | Active | |
| **Gamma Nu** | June 19, 2015 | Southern New Hampshire University Online | Manchester | New Hampshire | Active | (Note: Instruction is online.) |
| **Gamma Xi** | March 14, 1979 | Dakota State University | Madison | South Dakota | Active | |
| Gamma Omicron | 1978 | University of Baltimore | Baltimore | Maryland | Inactive | |
| **Gamma Pi** | May 8, 1979 | Eastern University | St. Davids | Pennsylvania | Active | |
| Gamma Rho | 1980 | Meredith College | Raleigh | North Carolina | Inactive | |
| **Gamma Sigma** | May 3, 1979 | Southern Nazarene University | Bethany | Oklahoma | Active | |
| Gamma Tau | 1979 | State University of New York at Oswego | Oswego | New York | Inactive | |
| Gamma Upsilon | 1980 | Susquehanna University | Selinsgrove | Pennsylvania | Inactive | |
| Gamma Phi | 1981 | Southampton College | Southampton | New York | Inactive | |
| **Gamma Chi** | March 3, 1981 | Illinois College | Jacksonville | Illinois | Active | |
| Gamma Psi | 1981 | California State Polytechnic University, Pomona | Pomona | California | Inactive | |
| **Gamma Omega** | November 21, 1981 | Eastern New Mexico University | Portales | New Mexico | Active | |
| Delta Alpha | 1982 | Salisbury University | Salisbury | Maryland | Inactive | |
| **Delta Beta** | April 16, 1982 | Texas A&M University–Kingsville | Kingsville | Texas | Active | |
| **Delta Beta** | June 2, 2006 | Texas A&M University–San Antonio | San Antonio | Texas | Active | |
| Delta Gamma | 1982 | Monmouth College | Monmouth | Illinois | Inactive | |
| **Delta Delta** | November 6, 1982 | Menlo College | Atherton | California | Active | |
| Delta Epsilon | 1983 | Le Moyne College | Syracuse | New York | Inactive | |
| Delta Zeta | 1983 | St. Mary's University, Texas | San Antonio | Texas | Inactive | |
| Delta Eta | 1983 | Central Connecticut State University | New Britain | Connecticut | Inactive | |
| Delta Theta | 1983 | State University of New York at Geneseo | Geneseo | New York | Inactive | |
| **Delta Iota** | September 29, 1982 | Hawaii Pacific University | Honolulu | Hawaii | Active | |
| **Delta Kappa** | April 7, 1984 | University of St. Francis | Joliet | Illinois | Active | |
| **Delta Lambda** | April 13, 1984 | Our Lady of the Lake University | San Antonio | Texas | Active | |
| Delta Mu | 1985 | St. Bonaventure University | St. Bonaventure | New York | Inactive | |
| Delta Nu | 1986 | Ramapo College | Mahwah | New Jersey | Inactive | |
| **Delta Xi** | May 13, 1984 | Northwood University | Midland | Michigan | Active | |
| **Delta Omicron** | April 14, 1985 | Mercyhurst University | Erie | Pennsylvania | Active | |
| **Delta Pi** | November 4, 1984 | Dowling College | Oakdale | New York | Inactive | |
| **Delta Rho** | March 1, 1985 | Freed–Hardeman University | Henderson | Tennessee | Active | |
| Delta Sigma | 1984 | Taylor University | Upland | Indiana | Inactive | |
| **Delta Tau** | April 20, 1985 | St. Catherine University | Saint Paul | Minnesota | Active | |
| **Delta Upsilon** | April 26, 1986 | Thomas Jefferson University | Philadelphia | Pennsylvania | Active | (Note: Delta Upsilon chapter was established at Philadelphia University, which merged with Thomas Jefferson University in 2017.) |
| **Delta Phi** | October 6, 1985 | State University of New York at Fredonia | Fredonia | New York | Active | |
| Delta Chi | 1986 | York College of Pennsylvania | Spring Garden Township | Pennsylvania | Inactive | |
| **Delta Psi** | May 5, 1985 | University of Indianapolis | Indianapolis | Indiana | Active | |
| **Delta Omega** | April 25, 1986 | Eastern Connecticut State University | Willimantic | Connecticut | Active | |
| **Epsilon Alpha** | October 17, 1986 | St. Thomas Aquinas College | Sparkill | New York | Active | |
| **Epsilon Beta** | October 11, 1986 | Ashland University | Ashland | Ohio | Active | |
| **Epsilon Gamma** | December 5, 1986 | Madonna University | Livonia | Michigan | Active | |
| Epsilon Delta | 1987 | Sacred Heart University | Fairfield | Connecticut | Inactive | |
| **Epsilon Epsilon** | July 29, 2004 | Augsburg University | Minneapolis | Minnesota | Active | |
| **Epsilon Zeta** | May 15, 1987 | Georgian Court University | Lakewood Township | New Jersey | Active | |
| **Epsilon Eta** | February 28, 1987 | Florida Institute of Technology | Melbourne | Florida | Active | |
| **Epsilon Eta** | December 3, 2009 | Florida Institute of Technology at Huntsville & Redstone Arsenal | Huntsville | Alabama | Inactive | (Note: The Huntsville, Alabama campus is permanently closed.) |
| **Epsilon Theta** | November 11, 1988 | MidAmerica Nazarene University | Olathe | Kansas | Active | |
| **Epsilon Iota** | November 1, 1989 | Mount Saint Mary College | Newburgh | New York | Active | |
| **Epsilon Kappa** | July 29, 2004 | Augsburg University | Minneapolis | Minnesota | Active | |
| **Epsilon Lambda** | October 29, 1988 | Fontbonne University | St. Louis | Missouri | Active | |
| **Epsilon Mu** | May 20, 1989 | California State University-Dominguez Hills | Carson | California | Active | |
| Epsilon Nu | 1989 | Southeastern Massachusetts University | Dartmouth | Massachusetts | Inactive | |
| **Epsilon Xi** | January 4, 1989 | Roosevelt University | Schaumburg | Illinois | Active | |
| Epsilon Omicron | 1990 | King's College | Wilkes-Barre | Pennsylvania | Inactive | |
| **Epsilon Pi** | November 8, 1990 | Fisk University | Nashville | Tennessee | Active | |
| **Epsilon Rho** | December 2, 1990 | Notre Dame of Maryland University | Baltimore | Maryland | Active | |
| **Epsilon Sigma** | February 8, 1991 | University of the District of Columbia | Washington, D.C. | District of Columbia | Active | |
| **Epsilon Tau** | May 19, 1991 | St. Joseph's College | Patchogue | New York | Active | |
| **Epsilon Upsilon** | April 28, 1991 | Texas A&M University–Texarkana | Texarkana | Texas | Active | |
| **Epsilon Phi** | October 10, 1991 | Elizabethtown College | Elizabethtown | Pennsylvania | Active | |
| Epsilon Chi | | | | | Inactive | |
| **Epsilon Psi** | December 6, 1992 | Linfield College | McMinnville | Oregon | Active | |
| **Epsilon Omega** | October 25, 1991 | Marymount University | Arlington County | Virginia | Active | |
| **Zeta Alpha** | December 6, 1992 | Stockton University | Galloway Township | New Jersey | Active | |
| **Zeta Beta** | April 27, 1992 | West Virginia State University | Hurricane | West Virginia | Active | |
| **Zeta Gamma** | December 14, 1992 | New Jersey City University | Jersey City | New Jersey | Active | |
| **Zeta Delta** | May 8, 1992 | College of Mount Saint Vincent | Riverdale, Bronx | New York | Active | |
| **Zeta Epsilon** | September 16, 1992 | Drury University | Springfield | Missouri | Active | |
| **Zeta Zeta** | May 3, 1992 | Massachusetts College of Liberal Arts | Pittsfield | Massachusetts | Active | |
| Zeta Eta | December 6, 1992 | Stockton University | Galloway Township | New Jersey | Inactive | |
| Zeta Theta | | | | | Inactive | |
| Zeta Iota | October 16, 1992 – February 2019 | Western International University | Chandler | Arizona | Inactive | (Note: The chapter went dormant when the college closed.) |
| **Zeta Kappa** | November 14, 1992 | Southwest Baptist University | Bolivar | Missouri | Active | |
| **Zeta Lambda** | April 17, 1993 | Tarleton State University | Stephenville | Texas | Active | |
| **Zeta Lambda** | November 13, 2008 | Tarleton State University Waco | Waco | Texas | Active | |
| **Zeta Mu** | April 25, 1993 | Keene State College | Keene | New Hampshire | Active | |
| **Zeta Nu** | May 8, 1993 | Southern Connecticut State University | New Haven | Connecticut | Active | |
| **Zeta Xi** | April 4, 1993 | Alcorn State University | Alcorn State | Mississippi | Active | |
| **Zeta Omicron** | October 15, 1993 | Troy University at Dothan | Dothan | Alabama | Active | |
| **Zeta Omicron** | February 23, 2006 | Troy University | Troy | Alabama | Active | |
| **Zeta Omicron** | May 20, 2010 | Troy University at Atlanta | Atlanta | Georgia | Active | |
| **Zeta Omicron** | January 19, 2017 | Troy University at Phenix City | Phenix City | Alabama | Active | |
| **Zeta Pi** | May 28, 1993 | LaGrange College | LaGrange | Georgia | Active | |
| Zeta Rho | 1993 | Nebraska Wesleyan University | Lincoln | Nebraska | Inactive | |
| **Zeta Sigma** | October 21, 1994 | Bloomfield College | Bloomfield | New Jersey | Active | |
| **Zeta Tau** | April 23, 1993 | Wingate University | Wingate | North Carolina | Active | |
| **Zeta Upsilon** | November 19, 1993 | Sul Ross State University | Alpine | Texas | Active | |
| Zeta Phi | 1994 | Midwestern State University | Wichita Falls | Texas | Inactive | |
| **Zeta Chi** | February 11, 1994 | Kentucky State University | Frankfort | Kentucky | Active | |
| **Zeta Psi** | April 15, 1994 | Wilkes University | Wilkes-Barre | Pennsylvania | Active | |
| **Zeta Omega** | April 16, 1994 | University of Central Oklahoma | Edmond | Oklahoma | Active | |
| **Eta Alpha** | February 22, 1994 | University of North Alabama | Florence | Alabama | Active | |
| **Eta Beta** | April 17, 1994 | Saint Mary's University of Minnesota | Winona | Minnesota | Active | |
| **Eta Gamma** | April 10, 1994 | Northwest Missouri State University | Maryville | Missouri | Active | |
| **Eta Delta** | April 10, 1994 | Texas Lutheran University | Seguin | Texas | Active | |
| Eta Epsilon | | | | | Inactive | |
| Eta Zeta | | | | | Inactive | |
| Eta Eta | | | | | Inactive | |
| Eta Theta | 1994–2015 | Southern Polytechnic State University | Marietta | Georgia | Inactive | (Note: The chapter went dormant when the college merged with Kennesaw State University.) |
| **Eta Iota** | December 1, 1994 | Oklahoma Christian University | Edmond | Oklahoma | Active | |
| Eta Kappa | 1994 | North Carolina Central University | Durham | North Carolina | Inactive | |
| **Eta Lambda** | November 20, 1994 | Embry-Riddle Aeronautical University | Daytona Beach | Florida | Active | |
| **Eta Mu** | April 13, 1995 | Lipscomb University | Nashville | Tennessee | Active | |
| **Eta Nu** | May 20, 1995 | Westminster University | Salt Lake City | Utah | Active | |
| Eta Xi | | | | | Inactive | |
| Eta Omicron | | | | | Inactive | |
| **Eta Pi** | April 25, 1997 | Albany State University | Albany | Georgia | Active | |
| Eta Rho | | | | | Inactive | |
| **Eta Sigma** | November 11, 1995 | Methodist University | Fayetteville | North Carolina | Active | |
| **Eta Tau** | April 27, 1996 | Dallas Baptist University | Dallas | Texas | Active | |
| Eta Upsilon | 1996 | University of St. Thomas | Minneapolis | Minnesota | Inactive | |
| **Eta Phi** | May 5, 1996 | Baker University | Baldwin City | Kansas | Active | |
| **Eta Chi** | February 23, 1996 | Grand Canyon University | Phoenix | Arizona | Active | |
| **Eta Psi** | April 27, 1996 | La Roche University | Pittsburgh | Pennsylvania | Active | |
| **Eta Omega** | May 7, 1996 | Mississippi College | Clinton | Mississippi | Active | |
| **Theta Alpha** | May 3, 1996 | East Central University | Ada | Oklahoma | Active | |
| Theta Beta | | | | | Inactive | |
| **Theta Gamma** | April 25, 1997 | University of the Incarnate Word | San Antonio | Texas | Active | |
| **Theta Gamma** | April 30, 2011 | University of the Incarnate Word | San Antonio | Texas | Active | |
| **Theta Delta** | May 17, 1997 | University of Bridgeport | Bridgeport | Connecticut | Active | |
| Theta Epsilon | 1997–2013 | North Georgia College and State University | Dahlonega | Georgia | Inactive | (Note: The chapter closed when the university merged with Gainesville State College to form the University of North Georgia.) |
| **Theta Zeta** | April 25, 1997 | St. Ambrose University | Davenport | Iowa | Active | |
| Theta Eta | 1997 | Bridgewater College | Bridgewater | Virginia | Inactive | |
| **Theta Theta** | May 9, 1997 | Louisiana College | Pineville | Louisiana | Active | |
| **Theta Iota** | April 14, 2010 | Norwich University | Northfield | Vermont | Active | |
| **Theta Kappa** | May 20, 1997 | Oklahoma Baptist University | Shawnee | Oklahoma | Active | |
| Theta Lambda | | | | | Inactive | |
| **Theta Mu** | November 2, 1997 | Oklahoma City University | Oklahoma City | Oklahoma | Active | |
| **Theta Nu** | November 22, 1997 | New Mexico Highlands University | Las Vegas | New Mexico | Active | |
| Theta Xi | 1998 | California Baptist University | Riverside | California | Inactive | |
| **Theta Omicron** | April 8, 1998 | Northeastern State University | Tahlequah | Oklahoma | Active | |
| **Theta Pi** | April 21, 1998 | University of West Alabama | Livingston | Alabama | Active | |
| Theta Pi | 1998 | Doane College | Crete | Nebraska | Inactive | |
| **Theta Rho** | March 18, 1998 | Langston University | Langston | Oklahoma | Active | |
| **Theta Sigma** | April 30, 1998 | Plymouth State University | Plymouth | New Hampshire | Active | |
| **Theta Tau** | April 19, 1998 | Saint Vincent College | Latrobe | Pennsylvania | Active | |
| **Theta Upsilon** | April 19, 1998 | Western New Mexico University | Silver City | New Mexico | Active | |
| Theta Phi | April 21, 1998 | University of West Alabama | Livingston | Alabama | Inactive | |
| **Theta Chi** | May 11, 1998 | Indiana University East | Richmond | Indiana | Active | |
| **Theta Psi** | October 2, 1998 | Geneva College | Beaver Falls | Pennsylvania | Active | |
| **Theta Omega** | January 27, 2000 | Woodbury University | Burbank | California | Active | |
| Iota Alpha | | | | | Inactive | |
| Iota Beta | 1999 | Salem University | Salem | West Virginia | Inactive | |
| **Iota Gamma** | April 7, 2000 | College of Saint Rose | Albany | New York | Active | |
| **Iota Delta** | October 28, 1999 | Millersville University of Pennsylvania | Millersville | Pennsylvania | Active | |
| **Iota Epsilon** | November 20, 1999 | Tiffin University | Tiffin | Ohio | Active | |
| Iota Zeta | 1999 | Lycoming College | Williamsport | Pennsylvania | Inactive | |
| **Iota Eta** | November 16, 1999 | Hardin-Simmons University | Abilene | Texas | Active | |
| **Iota Theta** | March 31, 2000 | Northwest Nazarene University | Nampa | Idaho | Active | |
| **Iota Iota** | March 1, 2000 | Cumberland University | Lebanon | Tennessee | Active | |
| Iota Kappa | April 7, 2000 | Mississippi Valley State University | Itta Bena | Mississippi | Inactive | |
| **Iota Lambda** | January 28, 2000 | Marywood University | Scranton | Pennsylvania | Active | |
| **Iota Mu** | May 2, 2000 | Voorhees College | Denmark | South Carolina | Active | |
| Iota Nu | 2000 | Dana College | Blair | Nebraska | Inactive | |
| **Iota Xi** | April 28, 2000 | Saint Xavier University | Chicago | Illinois | Active | |
| **Iota Omicron** | March 6, 2000 | Claflin University | Orangeburg | South Carolina | Active | |
| Iota Pi | May 8, 2000 | Oakwood College | Huntsville | Alabama | Inactive | |
| Iota Rho | 2000 | Southeastern Oklahoma State University | Durant | Oklahoma | Inactive | |
| **Iota Sigma** | March 23, 2001 | Cameron University | Lawton | Oklahoma | Active | |
| **Iota Tau** | March 5, 2001 | Florida Memorial University | Miami Gardens | Florida | Active | |
| Iota Upsilon | April 20, 2001 | Gannon University | Erie | Pennsylvania | Inactive | |
| **Iota Phi** | March 5, 2004 | Aurora University | Aurora | Illinois | Active | |
| **Iota Chi** | April 9, 2001 | Johnson C. Smith University | Charlotte | North Carolina | Active | |
| **Iota Psi** | October 26, 2001 | Paine College | Augusta | Georgia | Active | |
| **Iota Omega** | April 28, 2002 | Edinboro University of Pennsylvania | Edinboro | Pennsylvania | Active | |
| **Kappa Alpha** | November 6, 2003 | Cardinal Stritch University | Milwaukee | Wisconsin | Active | |
| **Kappa Beta** | May 26, 2003 | Walla Walla University | College Place | Washington | Active | |
| Kappa Gamma | 2004 | Spring Hill College | Mobile | Alabama | Inactive | |
| Kappa Delta | 2003 | Southwestern Oklahoma State University | Weatherford | Oklahoma | Inactive | |
| **Kappa Epsilon** | April 4, 2004 | Lenoir-Rhyne College | Hickory | North Carolina | Active | |
| **Kappa Zeta** | April 14, 2004 | University of Mobile | Prichard | Alabama | Active | |
| **Kappa Eta** | April 16, 2004 | Jarvis Christian College | Hawkins | Texas | Active | |
| **Kappa Theta** | April 15, 2004 | Maryville University | St. Louis | Missouri | Active | |
| **Kappa Iota** | March 31, 2004 | Bluefield State College | Bluefield | West Virginia | Active | |
| **Kappa Kappa** | November 16, 2004 | Chadron State College | Chadron | Nebraska | Active | |
| **Kappa Lambda** | May 6, 2005 | Mississippi University for Women | Columbus | Mississippi | Active | |
| Kappa Mu | 2004–2011 | Lambuth University | Jackson | Tennessee | Inactive | (Note: The chapter went defunct when Lambuth University closed. The University of Memphis now owns the campus and is now called its Lambuth branch campus.) |
| **Kappa Nu** | December 10, 2004 | Peirce College | Philadelphia | Pennsylvania | Active | |
| **Kappa Xi** | April 24, 2005 | DeSales University | Center Valley | Pennsylvania | Active | |
| **Kappa Omicron** | May 2, 2006 | Fairmont State University | Fairmont | West Virginia | Active | |
| Kappa Pi | | | | | Inactive | |
| **Kappa Rho** | April 10, 2006 | Cedarville University | Cedarville | Ohio | Active | |
| **Kappa Sigma** | April 10, 2006 | Neumann University | Aston Township | Pennsylvania | Active | |
| **Kappa Tau** | May 5, 2006 | Houston Baptist University | Sharpstown, Houston | Texas | Active | |
| **Kappa Upsilon** | November 27, 2006 | Arcadia University | Glenside | Pennsylvania | Active | |
| **Kappa Phi** | July 19, 2006 | Xavier University of Louisiana | New Orleans | Louisiana | Active | |
| **Kappa Chi** | December 3, 2006 | Gardner-Webb University | Boiling Springs | North Carolina | Active | |
| Kappa Psi | 2007 | Georgia Southwestern State University | Americus | Georgia | Inactive | |
| **Kappa Omega** | April 17, 2008 | Chicago State University | Chicago | Illinois | Active | |
| Lambda Alpha | | | | | Inactive | |
| Lambda Beta | | | | | Inactive | |
| **Lambda Gamma** | April 29, 2007 | Missouri Southern State University | Joplin | Missouri | Active | |
| **Lambda Delta** | December 3, 2009 | Governors State University | University Park | Illinois | Active | |
| **Lambda Epsilon** | May 11, 2007 | Edgewood College | Madison | Wisconsin | Active | |
| **Lambda Zeta** | April 27, 2007 | Alvernia University | Reading | Pennsylvania | Active | |
| **Lambda Eta** | June 14, 2007 | National University | Prescott | Arizona | Active | |
| **Lambda Theta** | March 5, 2008 | International School of Management | Paris | France | Active | |
| **Lambda Iota** | November 17, 2008 | Piedmont College | Athens | Georgia | Active | |
| **Lambda Kappa** | November 7, 2008 | Webster University St. Louis Region HQ | St. Louis | Missouri | Inactive | (Note: This chapter of Webster University is closed.) |
| **Lambda Kappa** | March 31, 2009 | Webster University Cha-am/Bangkok | Cha-am, Phetchaburi | Thailand | Inactive | |
| **Lambda Kappa** | May 1, 2009 | Webster University Arkansas Region | Fort Smith | Arkansas | Inactive | |
| **Lambda Kappa** | May 1, 2009 | Webster University Marine Corps Base Camp Lejeune | Camp LeJeune | North Carolina | Active | |
| **Lambda Kappa** | May 1, 2009 | Webster University Fort Liberty | Fayetteville | North Carolina | Active | |
| **Lambda Kappa** | May 1, 2009 | Webster University Fort Eisenhower | Fort Eisenhower | Georgia | Active | (Note: Chapter was established at Fort Gordon which is now called Fort Eisenhower.) |
| **Lambda Kappa** | May 1, 2009 | Webster University Fort Leonard Wood | Fort Leonard Wood | Missouri | Active | |
| **Lambda Kappa** | May 1, 2009 | Webster University Geneva | Canton de Geneve | Switzerland | Active | |
| **Lambda Kappa** | May 1, 2009 | Webster University Greenville | Greensville | South Carolina | Inactive | |
| **Lambda Kappa** | May 1, 2009 | Webster University Irvine Region | Irvine | California | Inactive | |
| **Lambda Kappa** | May 1, 2009 | Webster University Kansas City Region | Kansas City | Missouri | Inactive | |
| **Lambda Kappa** | May 1, 2009 | Webster University Leiden | Leiden | Netherlands | Active | |
| **Lambda Kappa** | May 1, 2009 | Webster University Luke, Air Force Base | Luke Air Force Base | Arizona | Inactive | |
| **Lambda Kappa** | May 1, 2009 | Webster University Myrtle Beach | Myrtle Beach | South Carolina | Active | |
| **Lambda Kappa** | May 1, 2009 | Webster University Oklahoma Region | Weatherford | Oklahoma | Inactive | |
| **Lambda Kappa** | May 1, 2009 | Webster University San Antonio | Fort Sam Houston | Texas | Active | |
| **Lambda Kappa** | May 1, 2009 | Webster University Space Coast Region | Merritt Island | Florida | Inactive | |
| **Lambda Kappa** | May 1, 2009 | Webster University Washington D.C. Region | Accokeek | Maryland | Inactive | |
| **Lambda Kappa** | May 4, 2009 | Webster University China | Shanghai | China | Active | |
| **Lambda Kappa** | May 4, 2009 | Webster University San Diego Metro | San Diego | California | Inactive | |
| **Lambda Kappa** | May 7, 2009 | Webster University Georgia Region | Savannah | Georgia | Inactive | |
| **Lambda Kappa** | May 15, 2009 | Webster University Little Rock Air Force Base | Jacksonville | Arkansas | Active | |
| **Lambda Kappa** | May 15, 2009 | Webster University Louisville Metro | Louisville | Kentucky | Inactive | |
| **Lambda Kappa** | May 16, 2009 | Webster University Central Florida Region | Longwood | Florida | Inactive | |
| **Lambda Kappa** | May 21, 2009 | Webster University Charleston Metro Region | North Charleston | South Carolina | Inactive | |
| **Lambda Kappa** | May 23, 2009 | Webster University Vienna | Vienna | Austria | Active | |
| **Lambda Kappa** | June 6, 2009 | Webster University Fairchild Air Force Base | Fairchild Air Force Base | Washington | Inactive | |
| **Lambda Kappa** | June 6, 2009 | Webster University Rocky Mountain Region | Peterson Air Force Base | Colorado | Inactive | |
| **Lambda Kappa** | May 6, 2010 | Webster University Columbia | Columbia | South Carolina | Active | |
| **Lambda Kappa** | May 9, 2010 | Webster University London | London | United Kingdom | Active | |
| **Lambda Kappa** | June 3, 2011 | Webster University Great Lakes | Great Lakes | Illinois | Inactive | |
| **Lambda Kappa** | December 21, 2011 | Webster University Memphis | Millington | Tennessee | Inactive | |
| **Lambda Lambda** | March 27, 2008 | Texas Wesleyan University | Fort Worth | Texas | Active | |
| **Lambda Mu** | September 16, 2008 | Business School Lausanne | Chavannes-près-Renens | Switzerland | Active | |
| **Lambda Nu** | April 18, 2009 | Pennsylvania College of Technology Williamsport | Williamsport | Pennsylvania | Active | |
| **Lambda Xi** | April 24, 2009 | Greensboro College | Greensboro | North Carolina | Active | |
| **Lambda Omicron** | March 16, 2011 | Morris College | Sumter | South Carolina | Active | |
| **Lambda Pi** | November 4, 2009 | Harris–Stowe State University | St. Louis | Missouri | Active | |
| **Lambda Rho** | December 12, 2009 | Medgar Evers College | Brooklyn | New York | Active | |
| **Lambda Sigma** | November 19, 2009 | University of Phoenix HQ | Phoenix | Arizona | Active | |
| **Lambda Sigma** | February 12, 2010 | University of Phoenix Idaho Campus | Boise | Idaho | Inactive | (Note: This campus of the University of Phoenix is closed.) |
| **Lambda Sigma** | April 4, 2010 | University of Phoenix Nashville Campus | Nashville | Tennessee | Inactive | |
| **Lambda Sigma** | May 27, 2010 | University of Phoenix Dallas Campus | Dallas | Texas | Active | |
| **Lambda Sigma** | November 4, 2010 | University of Phoenix New Jersey City Campus | Jersey City | New Jersey | Inactive | - |
| **Lambda Sigma** | November 4, 2010 | University of Phoenix Charlotte Campus | Charlotte | North Carolina | Inactive | |
| **Lambda Sigma** | February 25, 2011 | University of Phoenix San Diego Campus | San Diego | California | Inactive | (Note: This campus is permanently closed as of February 23, 2024.) |
| **Lambda Sigma** | March 25, 2011 | University of Phoenix Utah Campus | Salt Lake City | Utah | Inactive | |
| **Lambda Sigma** | April 30, 2011 | University of Phoenix Colorado Campus | Lone Tree | Colorado | Inactive | |
| **Lambda Sigma** | May 14, 2011 | University of Phoenix Louisville Campus | Louisville | Kentucky | Inactive | |
| **Lambda Sigma** | June 11, 2011 | University of Phoenix Central Florida Campus | Maitland | Florida | Inactive | |
| **Lambda Sigma** | September 7, 2011 | University of Phoenix Virtual Campus | Tempe | Arizona | Active | |
| **Lambda Sigma** | October 22, 2011 | University of Phoenix Las Vegas Campus | Las Vegas | Nevada | Inactive | |
| **Lambda Sigma** | December 3, 2011 | University of Phoenix South Florida Campus | Plantation | Florida | Inactive | |
| **Lambda Sigma** | January 14, 2012 | University of Phoenix El Paso Campus | El Paso | Texas | Inactive | |
| **Lambda Sigma** | February 1, 2012 | University of Phoenix San Antonio Campus | San Antonio | Texas | Inactive | |
| **Lambda Sigma** | March 31, 2012 | University of Phoenix Springfield Campus | Springfield | Illinois | Inactive | |
| **Lambda Sigma** | May 2, 2012 | University of Phoenix Phoenix | Tempe | Arizona | Active | |
| **Lambda Sigma** | May 3, 2012 | University of Phoenix Milwaukee Campus | Brookfield | Minnesota | Inactive | |
| **Lambda Sigma** | May 4, 2012 | University of Phoenix Detroit Campus | Troy | Michigan | Inactive | |
| **Lambda Sigma** | May 4, 2012 | University of Phoenix Maryland Campus | Columbia | Maryland | Inactive | |
| **Lambda Sigma** | June 20, 2012 | University of Phoenix Atlanta Campus | Sandy Springs | Georgia | Inactive | |
| **Lambda Sigma** | September 19, 2012 | University of Phoenix Houston Campus | Missouri City | Texas | Inactive | |
| **Lambda Sigma** | April 17, 2013 | University of Phoenix Augusta Campus | Augusta | Georgia | Inactive | |
| **Lambda Sigma** | January 7, 2014 | University of Phoenix Chicago Campus | Chicago | Illinois | Inactive | |
| **Lambda Sigma** | November 16, 2012 | University of Phoenix St. Louis Campus | St. Peters | Missouri | Inactive | |
| **Lambda Sigma** | January 18, 2013 | University of Phoenix North Florida Campus | Jacksonville | Florida | Inactive | |
| **Lambda Sigma** | February 8, 2013 | University of Phoenix Savannah Campus | Richmond Hill | Georgia | Inactive | |
| **Lambda Sigma** | May 3, 2013 | University of Phoenix Southern Arizona Campus | Tucson | Arizona | Inactive | |
| **Lambda Sigma** | March 14, 2014 | University of Phoenix Richmond Campus | Richmond | Virginia | Inactive | |
| **Lambda Sigma** | June 2, 2014 | University of Phoenix Philadelphia Campus | Philadelphia | Pennsylvania | Inactive | |
| **Lambda Sigma** | March 20, 2015 | University of Phoenix Washington Campus | Tukwila | Washington | Inactive | |
| **Lambda Sigma** | | University of Phoenix Hawaii Campus | Honolulu | Hawaii | Active | |
| **Lambda Tau** | April 15, 2010 | Lynchburg College | Lynchburg | Virginia | Active | |
| **Lambda Upsilon** | April 13, 2010 | Wheeling Jesuit University | Wheeling | West Virginia | Active | |
| **Lambda Phi** | April 20, 2010 | Lee University | Cleveland | Tennessee | Active | |
| **Lambda Chi** | April 22, 2010 | Cedar Crest College | Allentown | Pennsylvania | Active | |
| **Lambda Psi** | April 25, 2010 | Caldwell University | Caldwell | New Jersey | Active | |
| **Lambda Omega** | April 15, 2011 | Lindenwood University | St. Charles | Missouri | Active | |
| **Mu Alpha** | November 16, 2011 | Lewis University | Romeoville | Illinois | Active | |
| **Mu Beta** | April 20, 2012 | Ohio Dominican University | Columbus | Ohio | Active | |
| **Mu Gamma** | October 28, 2011 | Holy Family University | Philadelphia | Pennsylvania | Active | |
| **Mu Delta** | April 17, 2012 | Northwest University | Kirkland | Washington | Active | |
| **Mu Epsilon** | September 19, 2011 | American InterContinental University Headquarters | Schaumburg | Illinois | Active | |
| **Mu Epsilon** | October 20, 2011 | American InterContinental University Online | Bloomfield Hills | Michigan | Active | |
| **Mu Epsilon** | October 20, 2011 | American InterContinental University Atlanta | Atlanta | Georgia | Active | |
| **Mu Epsilon** | December 6, 2011 | American InterContinental University South Florida Campus | Weston | Florida | Active | |
| **Mu Epsilon** | June 1, 2012 | American InterContinental University Houston | Houston | Texas | Active | |
| **Mu Zeta** | November 15, 2011 | American Public University System | Charles Town | West Virginia | Active | |
| **Mu Eta** | June 25, 2014 | American University of Leadership | Rabat | Morocco | Active | |
| **Mu Theta** | April 17, 2012 | Anderson University | Anderson | South Carolina | Active | |
| **Mu Iota** | April 12, 2012 | Immaculata University | Immaculata | Pennsylvania | Active | |
| **Mu Kappa** | November 17, 2012 | Lincoln Memorial University | Harrogate | Tennessee | Active | |
| Mu Lambda | | | | | Inactive | |
| Mu Mu | | | | | Inactive | |
| **Mu Nu** | November 8, 2012 | Campbell University | Buies Creek | North Carolina | Active | |
| **Mu Xi** | April 19, 2013 | Northwestern Oklahoma State University | Alva | Oklahoma | Active | |
| **Mu Omicron** | April 16, 2013 | University of Mount Olive | Mount Olive | North Carolina | Active | |
| **Mu Pi** | April 14, 2013 | Brenau University | Gainesville | Georgia | Active | |
| **Mu Rho** | April 17, 2013 | LIM College | New York City | New York | Active | |
| Mu Sigma | | | | | Inactive | |
| Mu Tau | | | | | Inactive | |
| Mu Upsilon | | | | | Inactive | |
| **Mu Phi** | February 25, 2014 | DeVry University HQ, Downers Grove | Downers Grove | Illinois | Inactive | (Note: This DeVry campus has closed.) |
| **Mu Phi** | April 11, 2014 | DeVry University, Dallas Metro | Irving | Texas | Inactive | |
| **Mu Phi** | June 19, 2014 | DeVry University, Pomona, CA | Pomona | California | Inactive | |
| **Mu Phi** | July 11, 2014 | DeVry University, Houston Metro | Houston | Texas | Inactive | |
| **Mu Phi** | January 15, 2015 | DeVry University, Tinley Park | Tinley Park | Illinois | Inactive | |
| **Mu Phi** | January 15, 2015 | DeVry University, Chicago | Chicago | Illinois | Active | |
| **Mu Phi** | March 2, 2015 | DeVry University, New Brunswick | New Brunswick | New Jersey | Inactive | |
| **Mu Phi** | May 2, 2015 | DeVry University, South Florida Metro | Miramar | Florida | Inactive | |
| **Mu Phi** | June 17, 2015 | DeVry University, Orlando | Orlando | Florida | Active | |
| **Mu Phi** | June 25, 2015 | DeVry University, Addison | Elgin | Illinois | Inactive | |
| **Mu Phi** | July 1, 2015 | Devry University, Fort Washington | Fort Washington | Pennsylvania | Inactive | |
| **Mu Phi** | July 10, 2015 | DeVry University, Decatur Metro | Decatur | Georgia | Active | |
| **Mu Phi** | July 23, 2015 | DeVry University, Denver Metro, Westminster | Colorado Springs | Colorado | Inactive | |
| **Mu Phi** | November 13, 2015 | DeVry University, Fresno | Fresno | California | Inactive | |
| **Mu Phi** | July 15, 2016 | DeVry University, Arlington | Arlington | Virginia | Active | |
| **Mu Phi** | May 3, 2017 | DeVry University, San Diego | San Diego | California | Active | |
| **Mu Phi** | August 8, 2019 | DeVry University, Irving | Irving | Texas | Active | |
| **Mu Chi** | November 4, 2013 | Park University School of Business | Parkville | Missouri | Active | |
| **Mu Psi** | September 14, 2014 | Purdue University Global | Pembroke Pines | Florida | Active | (Note: The chapter was chartered at Kaplan University which Purdue University Global acquired in March 2018.) |
| **Mu Omega** | May 9, 2014 | Liberty University | Lynchburg | Virginia | Active | |
| **Nu Alpha** | April 5, 2014 | Lawrence Technological University | Southfield | Michigan | Active | |
| **Nu Beta** | April 2, 2014 | University of Findlay | Findlay | Ohio | Active | |
| **Nu Gamma** | March 16, 2016 | Ferris State University | Big Rapids | Michigan | Active | |
| **Nu Delta** | April 11, 2014 | Hood College | Frederick | Maryland | Active | |
| **Nu Epsilon** | March 24, 2014 | Messiah University | Mechanicsburg | Pennsylvania | Active | |
| **Nu Zeta** | June 3, 2014 | Post University | Waterbury | Connecticut | Active | |
| **Nu Eta** | May 9, 2014 | Point Loma Nazarene University | San Diego | California | Active | |
| **Nu Theta** | July 14, 2014 | South University Savannah | Savannah | Georgia | Active | |
| **Nu Theta** | October 10, 2014 | South University High Point | High Point | North Carolina | Active | |
| **Nu Theta** | December 13, 2014 | South University Tampa | Tampa | Florida | Active | |
| **Nu Theta** | May 28, 2015 | South University Richmond | Glen Allen | Virginia | Active | |
| **Nu Theta** | May 29, 2015 | South University Michigan | Novi | Michigan | Inactive | (Note: This South University campus is now closed) |
| **Nu Theta** | May 29, 2015 | South University Virginia Beach | Virginia Beach | Virginia | Inactive | |
| **Nu Theta** | June 4, 2015 | South University Columbia | Columbia | South Carolina | Active | |
| **Nu Theta** | June 4, 2015 | South University Warrensville | Warrensville Heights | Ohio | Inactive | |
| **Nu Theta** | June 15, 2015 | South University Online | Savannah | Georgia | Active | |
| **Nu Theta** | July 31, 2015 | South University West Palm Beach | West Palm Beach | Florida | Active | |
| **Nu Theta** | November 20, 2015 | South University Austin | Round Rock | Texas | Active | |
| **Nu Theta** | June 3, 2016 | South University Montgomery | Montgomery | Alabama | Active | |
| Nu Iota | | | | | Inactive | |
| Nu Kappa | September 10, 2014 | Purdue University-North Central | Westville | Indiana | Inactive | (Note: Purdue North Central merged with Purdue Calumet to create Purdue University Northwest in 2016.) |
| **Nu Lambda** | September 15, 2014 | Wiley College | Marshall, Texas | Texas | Active | |
| **Nu Mu** | March 17, 2015 | Notre Dame de Namur University | Belmont | California | Active | |
| Nu Xi | | | | | Inactive | |
| **Nu Omicron** | February 6, 2015 | Thomas More College | Crestview Hills | Kentucky | Active | |
| **Nu Pi** | September 24, 2015 | Horizons University | Paris | France | Active | |
| **Nu Rho** | December 17, 2015 | Walden University | Minneapolis | Minnesota | Active | |
| **Nu Sigma** | May 14, 2015 | Texas A&M University-Central Texas | Killeen | Texas | Active | |
| **Nu Tau** | June 12, 2015 | HSO Business School Switzerland | Zurich | Switzerland | Active | |
| **Nu Upsilon** | September 17, 2015 | Southeastern University | Lakeland | Florida | Active | |
| **Nu Phi** | April 22, 2015 | Keiser University West Palm Beach | West Palm Beach | Florida | Active | |
| **Nu Phi** | January 11, 2016 | Keiser University Fort Myers | Fort Myers | Florida | Active | |
| **Nu Phi** | April 1, 2016 | Keiser University Fort Lauderdale | Fort Lauderdale | Florida | Active | |
| **Nu Phi** | April 22, 2016 | Keiser University Tallahassee | Tallahassee | Florida | Active | |
| **Nu Phi** | July 20, 2016 | Keiser University Lakeland | Lakeland | Florida | Active | |
| **Nu Phi** | September 24, 2016 | Keiser University Jacksonville | Jacksonville | Florida | Active | |
| **Nu Phi** | September 30, 2021 | Keiser University Flagship | West Palm Beach | Florida | Active | |
| **Nu Chi** | February 20, 2020 | Kettering University | Flint | Michigan | Active | |
| **Nu Psi** | December 8, 2015 | University of Arkansas at Pine Bluff | Pine Bluff | Arkansas | Active | |
| **Nu Omega** | June 1, 2015 | Monroe College | The Bronx | New York | Active | |
| **Xi Alpha** | May 28, 2015 | Metropolitan College of New York | New York City | New York | Active | |
| Xi Beta | | | | | Inactive | |
| **Xi Gamma** | April 13, 2017 | Gallaudet University | Washington, D.C. | District of Columbia | Active | |
| **Xi Delta** | July 10, 2015 | Capella University | Minneapolis | Minnesota | Active | |
| Xi Epsilon | November 16, 2016 – March 8, 2019 | Argosy University | Orange | California | Inactive | (Note: The chapter went defunct when all Argosy campuses closed.) |
| **Xi Zeta** | April 1, 2016 | Lake Superior State University | Sault Ste. Marie | Michigan | Active | |
| **Xi Eta** | March 22, 2016 | American University of Kuwait | Salmiya | Kuwait | Active | |
| **Xi Theta** | June 24, 2017 | PSG Institute of Management | Coimbatore | Tamil Nadu, India | Active | |
| Xi Iota | | | | | Inactive | |
| **Xi Kappa** | April 29, 2016 | John Brown University | Siloam Springs | Arkansas | Active | |
| Xi Lambda | April 14, 2016 | University of the Sciences | Philadelphia | Pennsylvania | Inactive | (Note: The university merged into Saint Joseph's University on June 1, 2022.) |
| **Xi Mu** | April 8, 2016 | Saint Leo University | St. Leo | Florida | Active | |
| **Xi Nu** | April 30, 2016 | Westminster College | Fulton | Missouri | Active | |
| **Xi XI** | April 26, 2016 | Central State University | Wilberforce | Ohio | Active | |
| **Xi Omicron** | April 22, 2016 | Coppin State University | Baltimore | Maryland | Active | |
| **Xi Pi** | May 6, 2016 | Saint Martin's University | Lacey | Washington | Active | |
| **Xi Rho** | February 23, 2017 | Colorado State University–Global Campus | Aurora | Colorado | Active | |
| **Xi Sigma** | February 23, 2017 | Millikin University | Decatur | Illinois | Active | |
| **Xi Tau** | March 15, 2017 | State University of New York at Morrisville | Morrisville | New York | Active | |
| **Xi Upsilon** | April 13, 2017 | Lasell College | Newton | Massachusetts | Active | |
| **Xi Phi** | April 26, 2018 | University of Akron | Akron | Ohio | Active | |
| **Xi Chi** | December 4, 2017 | Northern State University | Aberdeen, South Dakota | South Dakota | Active | |
| **Xi Psi** | May 9, 2018 | Colby–Sawyer College | New London | New Hampshire | Active | |
| **Xi Omega** | June 7, 2018 | Ottawa University | Ottawa | Kansas | Active | |
| Omicron Alpha | | | | | Inactive | |
| **Omicron Beta** | September 25, 2017 | Limestone University | Gaffney | South Carolina | Active | |
| **Omicron Gamma** | November 30, 2017 | Palm Beach State College | Lake Worth | Florida | Active | |
| **Omicron Delta** | October 24, 2017 | Heidelberg University | Tifflin | Ohio | Active | |
| **Omicron Epsilon** | May 3, 2018 | Huston–Tillotson University | Austin | Texas | Active | |
| **Omicron Zeta** | December 5, 2017 | Virginia Union University | Richmond | Virginia | Active | |
| Omicron Eta | September 25, 2018 | Pfeiffer University | Misenheime | North Carolina | Inactive | |
| **Omicron Theta** | April 27, 2018 | University of Redlands | Redlands | California | Active | |
| Omicron Iota | November 1, 2018 | Champlain College | Burlington | Vermont | Inactive | |
| **Omicron Kappa** | April 22, 2018 | Lebanon Valley College | Annville Township | Pennsylvania | Active | |
| Omicron Lambda | September 29, 2018 | California Southern University | Chandler | Arizona | Inactive | |
| Omicron Mu | November 19, 2018 | Lesley University | Cambridge | Massachusetts | Inactive | |
| **Omicron Nu** | August 20, 2018 | Thomas Edison State University | Trenton | New Jersey | Active | |
| **Omicron Xi** | March 22, 2019 | University of Mount Union | Alliance | Ohio | Active | |
| **Omicron Pi** | February 26, 2019 | West Virginia University at Parkersburg | Parkersburg | West Virginia | Active | |
| **Omicron Rho** | May 16, 2019 | United International Business Schools | Zurich | Switzerland | Active | |
| **Omicron Sigma** | June 20, 2019 | Southwestern Oklahoma State University | Weatherford | Oklahoma | Active | |
| **Omicron Tau** | September 21, 2023 | University of Mary Hardin–Baylor | Belton | Texas | Active | |
| **Omicron Phi** | November 8, 2019 | Cornerstone University | Grand Rapids | Michigan | Active | |
| Omicron Chi | | | | | Inactive | |
| **Omicron Psi** | October 8, 2020 | Concord University | Athens | Virginia | Active | |
| **Omicron Omicron** | April 9, 2019 | Mount Saint Mary's University, Los Angeles | Los Angeles | California | Active | |
| **Pi Alpha** | May 11, 2016 | University American College Skopje | Skopje | North Macedonia | Active | |
| **Pi Beta** | March 25, 2021 | Florida State College at Jacksonville | Jacksonville | Florida | Active | |
| **Pi Gamma** | May 24, 2021 | Colorado Technical University | Colorado Springs | Colorado | Active | |
| **Pi Delta** | November 16, 2021 | Concordia University Chicago | River Forest | Illinois | Active | |
| **Pi Epsilon** | April 26, 2021 | Cabrini University | Radnor Township | Pennsylvania | Active | |
| **Pi Zeta** | November 20, 2021 | Metropolitan State University | Minneapolis | Minnesota | Active | |
| **Pi Eta** | November 18, 2021 | Miles College | Fairfield | Alabama | Active | |
| **Pi Theta** | February 23, 2022 | William Woods University | Fulton | Missouri | Active | |
| **Pi Iota** | November 29, 2021 | Milligan University | Milligan College | Tennessee | Active | |
| **Pi Kappa** | June 21, 2022 | City University of Seattle | Seattle | Washington | Active | |
| **Pi Lambda** | June 30, 2022 | United States Sports Academy | Daphne | Alabama | Active | |
| **Pi Mu** | July 28, 2022 | Westcliff University | Irvine | California | Active | |
| **Pi Nu** | May 11, 2023 | University of Charleston | Charleston | West Virginia | Active | |
| Pi Xi | | | | | Inactive | |
| **Pi Omicron** | November 3, 2022 | Evangel University | Springfield | Missouri | Active | |
