= Buddy Jackson =

American gridiron football player (born 1989)

No. 40
- Position: Cornerback

Personal information
- Born: March 3, 1989 (age 37); Plantation, Florida, U.S.
- Listed height: 6 ft 1 in (1.85 m)
- Listed weight: 189 lb (86 kg)

Career information
- High school: Cypress Bay (Weston, Florida)
- College: Pittsburgh

Career history
- 2012: Indianapolis Colts*
- 2012: Washington Redskins*
- 2013: New York Giants*
- 2013: Kansas City Chiefs*
- 2013: Pittsburgh Steelers*
- 2013–2015: Calgary Stampeders
- 2015–2016: Dallas Cowboys*
- 2016: Saskatchewan Roughriders
- 2017: BC Lions
- 2018: Edmonton Eskimos*
- * Offseason or practice squad member only

Awards and highlights
- Grey Cup champion (2014)
- Stats at Pro Football Reference
- Stats at CFL.ca

Anthony Hugh "Buddy" Jackson II (born March 3, 1989) is an American former professional football cornerback who played in the Canadian Football League (CFL). He played college football at the University of Pittsburgh. Jackson was a member of the Indianapolis Colts, Washington Redskins, New York Giants, Kansas City Chiefs, Pittsburgh Steelers, and Dallas Cowboys of the National Football League, and the Calgary Stampeders, Saskatchewan Roughriders, BC Lions, and Edmonton Eskimos of the CFL.

== Early life ==
Jackson was a three-year varsity letterman at Cypress Bay High School in Weston, Florida, starting two years at cornerback. He also participated in basketball and track, where he was a district champion in the 100-metre dash.

== College career ==
Jackson played for the Pittsburgh Panthers from 2008 to 2011. He was redshirted in 2007. He recorded 34 total tackles, four pass break-ups and one fumble recovery his senior year.

== Professional career ==
Jackson signed with the Indianapolis Colts of the National Football League (NFL) on April 30, 2012, after going undrafted in the 2012 NFL draft. He was waived/injured by the Colts on August 15, 2012.

On November 12, 2012, Jackson was signed to the practice squad of the Washington Redskins' of the NFL.

Jackson signed a futures contract with the NFL's New York Giants on January 25, 2013. He was released by the Giants on May 11, 2013.

Jackson was claimed off waivers by the Kansas City Chiefs of the NFL on May 14, 2013. He was released by the Chiefs on August 1, 2013.

Jackson was claimed off waivers by the Pittsburgh Steelers of the NFL on August 1, 2013. He was released by the Steelers on August 10, 2013.

Jackson spent the 2013 CFL season on the Calgary Stampeders' practice roster. He made his CFL debut on June 28, 2014, starting against the Montreal Alouettes. He started 12 games at cornerback, recording 42 tackles, during the 2014 CFL season. Jackson was on the injury list for six games.

On December 22, 2015, Jackson was signed to the practice squad of the Dallas Cowboys' of the NFL. He was released by the Cowboys on May 6, 2016.

Jackson signed with the CFL's Saskatchewan Roughriders on June 21, 2016. Jackson played six games for the Riders in 2016, contributing 21 tackles.

Jackson signed with the BC Lions of the CFL on February 14, 2017. In one season in BC Jackson accumulated 17 defensive tackles, four special teams tackles and recorded his first career interception.

On February 28, 2018, Jackson signed with the Edmonton Eskimos of the CFL. He retired on May 24, 2018.
