= Weston Branch Library =

- 26.0681°N 80.39433°W
- Location: 4205 Bonaventure Blvd, Weston, Florida 33326, United States
- Type: Public Library
- Established: 1974 (Broward County Library System established), 1996 (branch built)
- Branch of: Broward County Library

Access and use
- Access requirements: Broward County Library Card (Valid Broward County Address)
- Population served: 65,672

Other information
- Director: Skye Patrick
- Website: Library website

The Weston Branch Library is a branch of the Broward County Library. It is the most western branch of the library in the county, and is part of the Miami metropolitan area. The Florida Everglades National Park borders the city to the North, and the library itself sits less than 2 miles from the Everglades.

== General History & Demographics ==
The Weston Branch Library serves the city of Weston, Florida. It serves a population of 65,672 people, but also allows books to be borrowed by the over 9 million users in the Broward County Library System. The library branch was built after the city of Weston was incorporated in 1996. The library was originally in a much smaller building, but was moved to a new building due to the growing collection. The library shares building space with one of Broward College's satellite campuses. The library has a good collection of material in Spanish, as Weston has the largest concentration of Venezuelans and the fourteenth highest concentration of Colombian residents in the United States. Over 31% of the population speaks Spanish at home.

== Education ==
While the library building itself houses classrooms for a satellite campus of Broward College, the library is also surrounded by schools. On one side is Manatee Bay Elementary School, while Falcon Cove Middle School and Cypress Bay High School sit across from the library on Vista Park Blvd. The library therefore has a high concentration of young adult literature and graphic novels for its frequent student visitors.

== Weston Library Park ==
Beginning construction in 2007, the Library Park was built to be an open area for outdoor reading and library events. Located between the library building and Cypress Bay High School on the corner of Bonaventure and Vista Park Blvd., the park is often frequented by students from the nearby schools. There are multiple water features and both covered and uncovered seating areas and walkways.

The Weston Library Park officially opened in October 2009. Construction of this park cost roughly $2.2million, and the city received a small grant from the State of Florida, Division of Recreation and Parks, to assist with the development of the park. The main noticeable features of this park are the circular fountain and the three gazebos.

For an informational stroll, visitors may follow the "Ring of Florida Authors" or the "Walk of Discovery." The first route circles around the fountain and features 20 bronze plaques highlighting the literary works of authors and playwrights with strong connections to Florida. The "Walk of Discovery" features 10 bronze plaques around the park floors depicting the local history dating back to thousands of years.
