= The Paper (2008 TV series) =

- Developed by: Marshall Eisen, Lindsey Bannister, Jessica Chesler, and Sam Simmons
- Directed by: Dave Sirulnick
- Music by: Josh Myers
- Opening theme: "Medium Wave" by The Voodoo Trombone Quartet (Freshly Squeezed music)
- Country of origin: United States
- No. of seasons: 1
- No. of episodes: 8

Production
- Running time: 30 minutes (including commercials)

Original release
- Network: MTV
- Release: April 14 – May 26, 2008

The Paper is a reality television series on MTV. The show covers the lives of the Cypress Bay High School newspaper staff, focusing mostly on four senior editors. It is set in Weston, Florida.

The series finale aired on May 26, 2008.

The second season had been cast at a high school in Texas but midway into production the season became the TV series My Life as Liz.

== Format ==
The show typically follows the students' lives during school, during the layout and writing of their paper, and during their free time.

== Cast ==
=== Main cast ===
- Amanda Lorber - Editor-in-Chief (formerly Copy Editor)
- Alex Angert - Managing Editor (formerly Sports Editor)
- Giana Pacinelli - News Editor (formerly Clubs Editor)
- Adam Brock - Advertising Manager (formerly Business Manager; essentially same position)
- Cassia Laham - Entertainment Editor (no change in position)
- Trevor Ballard - Layout Editor (formerly Assistant Business Manager)
- Dan Surgan - Staff Writer (no change in position)
- Mrs. Rhonda Weiss - Faculty Advisor

=== Supporting cast ===
- Charesse James - Copy Editor
- Alix Cohen - Clubs Editor
- Katie Martin - Features Editor
- Reed Yaras - Sports Editor
- Yonny Yamon - Former Editor-in-Chief
- Scott Rasner - Adam's competition for Homecoming King
- Joey Hodges - Amanda's would-be date to Homecoming
- Michael Jan - Cypress Bay "superteen"
- Priscilla Ivasco - Contributing Author
- Jeff Glovsky - Super Accountant

== Episodes ==
=== Episode 1: "The Race for Editor-in-Chief" ===
The lead editors of The Circuit, the student-run newspaper at the largest high school in the country, wage an all-out battle for the coveted top position of editor-in-chief. On the line is the chance to lead the paper's staff of 70 — not to mention a juicy spot on a resume to impress college admissions boards. Each candidate brings something special to the table — Giana's got a nose for news, Adam is an advertising monster, Alex has his finger on the pulse of the student body, and Amanda is a born leader. The one common element they all share is the unfettered drive to succeed — but only one can emerge victorious. Who will emerge to take their award-winning paper to new heights? Will their individual ambitions tear their friendships apart?

=== Episode 2: "The New School Year Begins" ===
After a bittersweet victory, Amanda is now the "big cheese" - whether The Circuit staffers like it or not. And since Amanda's peers spent the summer avoiding her, it seems like they are leaning more towards "not." But Amanda, after taking their often harsh criticism to heart, is now determined to "kill 'em with kindness." She kicks off the year with a brand new look and an old-fashioned ice cream social to bring the staff together. She vows to lead the paper with grace and democracy. But while the other editors are carefully measuring "ice cream socials" on the lameness scale, Amanda takes aside Alex, her "best friend" and second-in-command, to make a pact. He reluctantly agrees to do what's best for the paper and never let their positions get in the way of their friendship. However, with each new issue, it's uncertain if either of them will be able to keep up their end of the bargain.

=== Episode 3: "Friday Night Fights" ===
With Alex on board as her "Number Two," Amanda assumes they are ready to be the new face of the paper. But their unified front cracks when Alex comes up with a banging football story that puts his 128-pound frame on the gridiron and sacks Amanda's plans for more serious stories. A misunderstanding between them causes a rift in the Amanda/Alex union, but, not sweating it, Alex looks past their problems and has his eye on a junior editor with all the right stuff! The courtship takes them to a Dave Matthews Band concert where he must decide how to balance his senior year with partying and the strictly business world of the paper under Amanda's regime.

=== Episode 4: "Deadline Duel" ===
It is deadline time at the paper, and reeling from a kick-ass concert and successful romance, a confident Alex is determined to prove he should have been chosen as top dog over Amanda. And judging by the number of people who want him to edit their work instead of Amanda, he is not the only one who feels that way. Everything goes smoothly until Adam's quest to break the ad sales record leaves them with more pages than they can possibly fill up with stories — leaving their first deadline of the year in chaos.

=== Episode 5: "The Vietnam of Newspapers" ===
Despite a renewed pact between Alex and Amanda, an explosive newspaper editors meeting reveals two warring cliques with Amanda and Alex the generals of opposing sides. When Amanda decides to take Dan's (Alex's best pal) humor column, the fragile peace between the two sides is shattered. As lingering bitterness about the editor-in-chief race bubbles to the surface, Amanda faces the possibility of mutiny among her staff.

=== Episode 6: "Picture Perfect Homecoming?" ===
With her class in the midst of a civil war, fearless teacher Mrs. Weiss adopts drastic measures to force the two sides to work together. A ceasefire is restored just in time for the next deadline, but there's no telling how long it will last. Homecoming arrives to relieve some stress. One of the staffers just might win Homecoming King. But not without some good old-fashioned smack-talk from the main competition, who is of course a popular football hero.

=== Episode 7: "Superteen Bonding" ===
Giana's article on a teen genius shakes up the paper's status quo — some love him, some hate him, but competitiveness is as competitiveness does and everyone seems to be comparing themselves to him. Alex challenges Trevor, Dan, and Adam to compete against the superteen in various contests of strength and intellect. Meanwhile, in an effort to quell the underlying tension in class, Mrs. Weiss calls the editors in for a team-bonding retreat. To the surprise of many, Trevor steps up and emerges as a strong leader in his own right. Will it be enough to win back Giana, who just might find herself secretly rooting for the competition?

=== Episode 8: "The Final Showdown" ===
An entire semester of unspoken tension comes to a head as Alex and Amanda confront each other about their rocky relationship — on both professional and personal levels. Their uneasy truce has lasted this long, but some things you just cannot keep inside forever. Will Alex finally tell Amanda what he's been holding back all this time, leaving Amanda to wonder if professional success is worth the cost of friendship? And what's to become of the paper if its top brass cannot see eye to eye anymore?
