= American Heritage Schools =

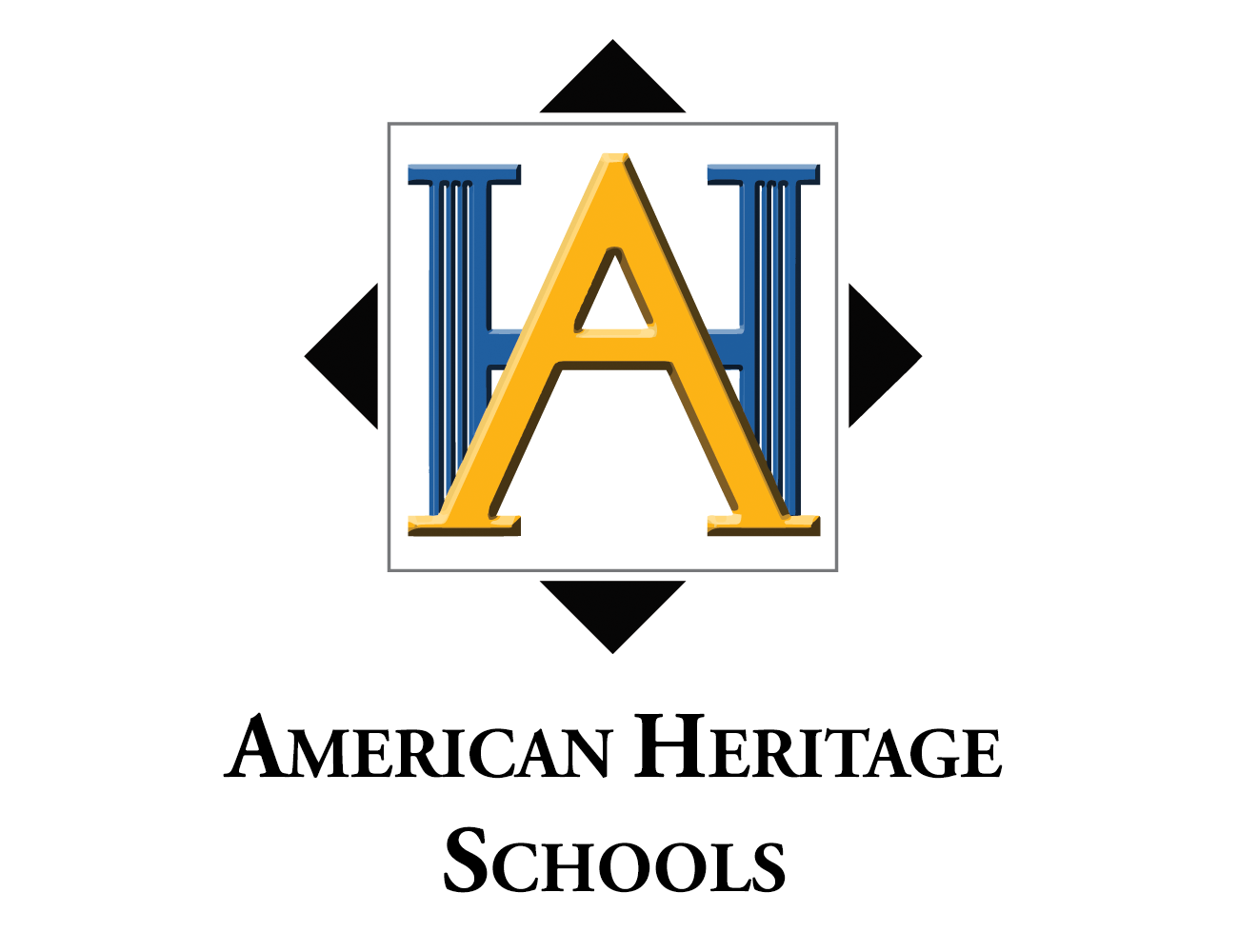

Location
- Plantation & Delray Beach, Florida 33325 & 33484; United States; 26.121029°N 80.31086°W; 26.4372378°N 80.1424404°W

Information
- Type: Independent, nonsectarian, day, college preparatory
- Motto: Knowledge; Integrity; Compassion
- Established: 1965
- Founder: William R. Laurie (Plantation Campus) & Bob Stone (Original founder of Boca Delray until Mr. Laurie purchased the school from Mr. Stone)
- CEEB code: 101422 & 100426
- Teaching staff: 265.0 FTE (Plantation Campus), 162.3 FTE (Delray Beach Campus)
- Grades: Pre-K 3–12
- Gender: Coeducational
- Enrollment: 2802 (Plantation Campus), 1645 (Delray Beach Campus)
- Colors: Plantation Campus: Black & gold Delray Beach Campus: Blue & grey
- Mascot: Patriot (Plantation) & Stallion (Delray Beach)
- Newspaper: Patriot Post (Plantation), Stallion Sentinel (Delray Beach)
- Yearbook: Spotlight (Plantation), Stampede (Delray Beach)
- Tuition: $32,800 (PreK3–PreK4); $34,900 (Kindergarten); $37,600 (1–5); $40,200 (6–8); $42,700 (9–12)
- Website: www.ahschool.com

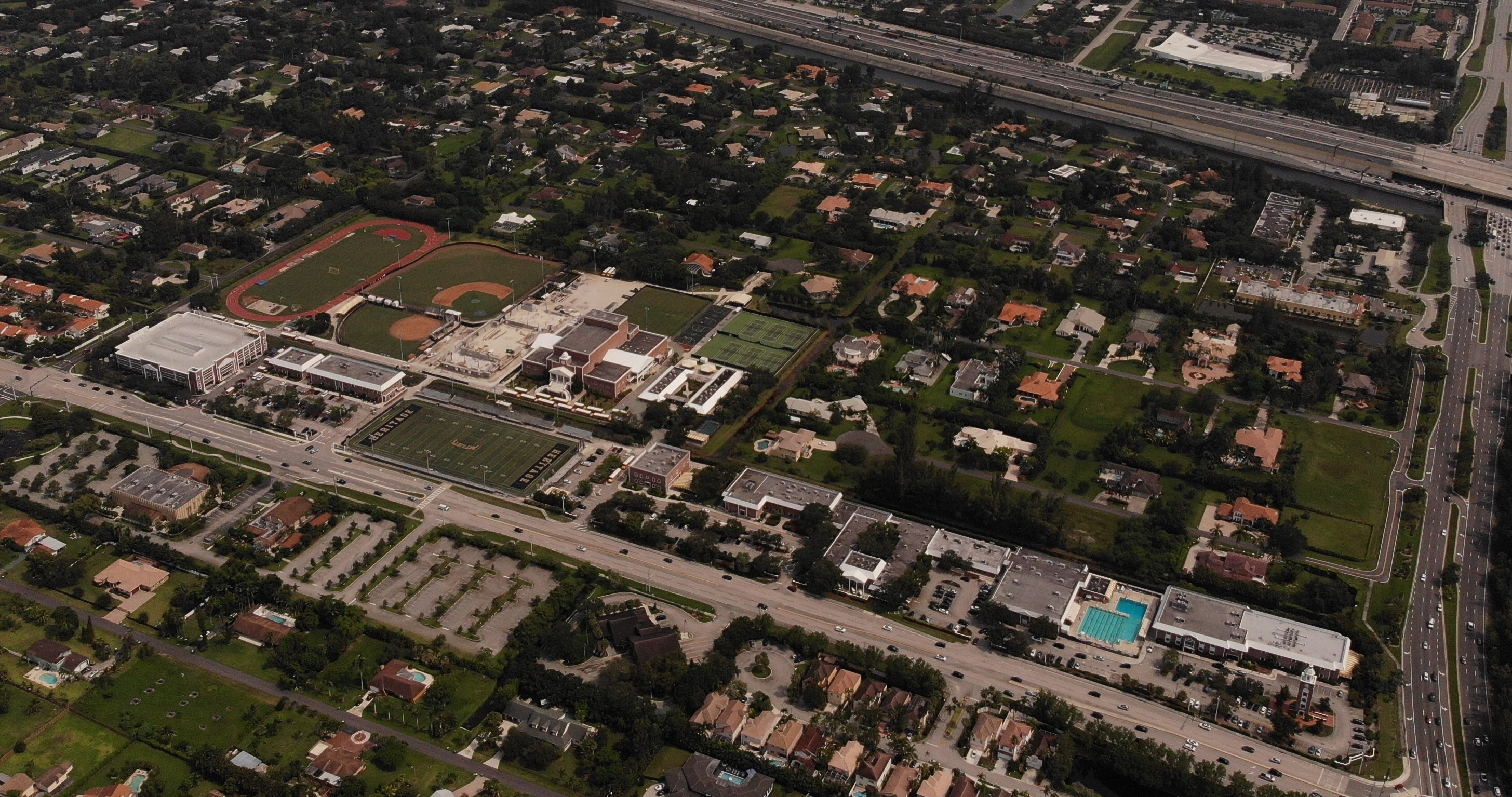
An aerial shot of the American Heritage School Plantation Campus.

The American Heritage Schools (AHS, Heritage) are a pair of private, college preparatory, independent, nonsectarian, and co-educational day schools for grades Pre-K 3 through 12. The two campuses together teach 4,200 students and are located in the United States in Plantation, Florida, a suburb just west of Fort Lauderdale in Broward County, and in Delray Beach, Florida, a city just north of Boca Raton in southern Palm Beach County.

In the 2027 Best Private K–12 Schools rankings, the Broward campus placed first in Florida and fifteenth nationally.

== History ==
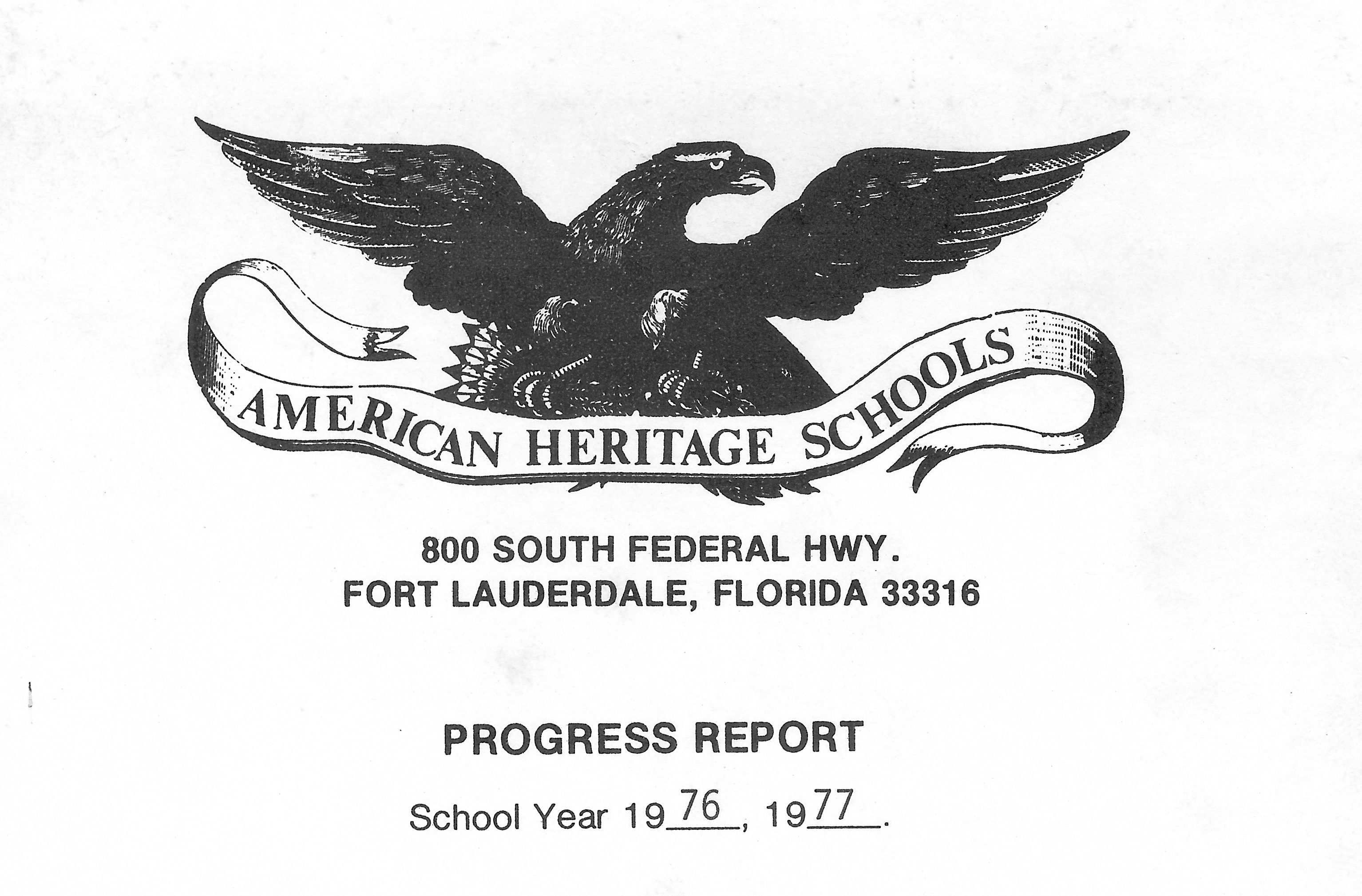
1977 logo

The school was first established by William R. Laurie in 1965. Heritage opened its first campus in 1971 at 800 South Federal Highway in Fort Lauderdale, Florida. In 1973, the school opened a second campus at 1725 Monroe St. in Hollywood, Florida. In 1975, Laurie opened a third campus located at 12200 W. Broward Boulevard in Plantation, Florida. The three campuses were later consolidated into the Broward Campus. Since moving to the 35-acre (14 ha) property, the campus has expanded several times.

The sister school on the Palm Beach campus was originally founded in 1993 as All-Star Academy by Bob Stone, before it was sold due to financial problems and bought by Laurie in 1997. In 1999, American Heritage School in Plantation officially took over the school, with Bob Stone remaining as the headmaster.

Heritage is a tuition-only school that neither asks for nor accepts donations. The school is managed by educators, and has no governing board. Children of faculty and staff can attend the school without paying tuition.

== Campuses ==
American Heritage has two 40-acre (16 ha) campuses: the Broward campus in Plantation and the Palm Beach campus in Delray Beach. Both house grades Pre-K 3 through 12 grade. Facilities include investigative science labs headed by Ph.D. research scientists, engineering and robotics labs, media centers, a mock courtroom, outdoor environmental classrooms with a certified wildlife habitat, an arts center, a 25-yard short course pool, sports fields, and courtyards. The Center for Fine Arts on the Broward Campus includes several performance spaces including an 800-seat main stage. In March 2019, American Heritage opened the Science Research, Engineering, and Robotics building on the Palm Beach Campus. The research center includes two biosafety level 2 laboratories: a chemistry lab and a biology lab. Also home to the pre-engineering department, the building includes a robotics lab with several 3D printers.

Like the South Florida area, students at American Heritage come from diverse backgrounds. About 70 countries are represented among the student body.

The current president of American Heritage School is Dr. Douglas R. Laurie, M.Ed., D.C., son of founder William R. Laurie.

== Academics ==
In the Lower School, advanced courses are offered, including the Stanford University math program for accelerated math students in grades 4–6. Fifteen elective classes are integrated into all students' daily schedules. The Upper School offers more than 300 courses, which includes 133 honors courses, 29 Advanced Placement (AP) courses, and 75 fine arts classes. In 2015, AHS was one of five schools in the nation with three students with perfect scores in an AP exam.

The Medical Professions program offers students a pre-med track including advanced courses in Genetics, Medical Terminology, and Pathology. American Heritage also offers five other pre-professional programs which include business and entrepreneurship, pre-law, pre-engineering, biomedical engineering and computer science.

In 2016, 50 students at AHS were named semifinalists to the National Merit Scholarship Program, the most in Florida and ninth in the nation. In September 2018, 24 students on the Delray Beach campus and 70 students on the Plantation campus were named semifinalists to the 2019 National Merit Scholarship. The class of 2022 on the Plantation campus had 77 National Merit finalists and semifinalists. There were also 21 Presidential Scholar candidates from the class of 2022 on the Plantation campus. In 2025, 87 American Heritage students were named National Merit Scholar Semifinalists, including 57 from the Broward campus and 30 from the Palm Beach campus. This was the highest combined total among Florida schools for the 16th consecutive year.

== Athletics ==
As of 2018, Heritage's Patriots football team has won three out of its last five state championship titles and ended the undefeated 2017 season with a 27-game winning streak. The team has won the Florida High School Athletic Association's Class 5A Football Championships in 2013, 2016, and 2017. The 2018 Patriots included two cornerbacks rated five stars by 247Sports.com, Patrick Surtain II and Tyson Campbell, both selected in the 2021 NFL draft. Together with two other four-star prospects from American Heritage, they were collectively referred to as the "AH4".

The school's second team on the Palm Beach Campus, the Stallions, have won the Class 1A Football Championships in 2007 and 2009, as well as the Class 3A Championship in 2011.

The Plantation campus football team won the Florida High School Athletic Association Class 4A state championship in 2024, defeating Jones High School of Orlando 40–31. It was American Heritage's sixth Florida state football title and its first since 2020.

American Heritage also has athletics programs for bowling, baseball, cheerleading, golf, ice hockey, lacrosse, soccer, softball, swimming, tennis, track and field, volleyball, weightlifting, and wrestling.

== Student life ==
In 2025, the Broward campus ranked first among accredited private schools at the Mu Alpha Theta National Convention.

In 2026, the Broward campus's team won the Florida Bar High School Appellate Brief Writing and Moot Court Competition, while the Palm Beach campus's team finished second. The final was held at the Florida Supreme Court.

In 2020, student work produced for WAHS News at the Plantation campus placed first in the National Scholastic Press Association's Broadcast News Story and Broadcast Commentary categories.

The Broward campus stages student-led theatre productions, with students working on stage and in sound, lighting, makeup and marketing.

== Community service ==
American Heritage Schools' annual Heroes benefit for Lighthouse of Broward raised $68,000 in 2024. In 2026, the school reported that the event series had raised more than $380,000 cumulatively to support programs for young people who are blind or visually impaired.

== Notable faculty and staff ==
- Patrick Surtain Sr. – professional football cornerback
- Jeff Dellenbach – professional football center

== Notable alumni ==
- River Alexander – '18, actor
- Shaun Anderson – '13, MLB pitcher
- Brandon Barriera - '22, MiLB pitcher
- Andrea Berger - '88, tennis player
- Kenny Boynton – '09, basketball player
- Brian Burns – '16, NFL Pro Bowl linebacker
- Tyson Campbell – '18, NFL cornerback
- Triston Casas – '18, MLB player
- Jakob Chychrun – '16, NHL player
- Zack Collins – '13, MLB player
- Damion Cook - '97, NFL offensive lineman
- Nick Eubanks – '16, professional football player
- Mark Fletcher Jr. – '23, college football player
- Alex Freeman – '22, professional soccer player
- Oronde Gadsden II – '21, professional football player
- Khalil Herbert – '16, professional football running back
- Eric Hosmer – '08, professional baseball player
- James Houston IV — '17, professional football player
- Ruben Hyppolite II - '20, NFL linebacker
- Jonathan India — '15, professional baseball player
- Brandon Inniss – '23, college football player
- Brandon Johnson - '16, NFL wide receiver
- Marvin Jones Jr. – '22, NFL linebacker for the Seattle Seahawks
- Greg Joseph – '13, NFL place kicker
- Ta'Niya Latson – '22, college basketball player
- Earl Little Jr. – '22, college football player
- Deven Marrero – '08, professional baseball player
- Tarvarus McFadden – '15, professional football player
- Isaiah McKenzie – '14, professional football player and co-owner of La Traila Barbecue
- Camila Mendes – '12, actress, Veronica Lodge on Riverdale
- Marken Michel – '11, football player
- Sony Michel – '14, football player, running back
- Mike Morris - '19, professional football player
- Adrian Nieto – '08, former professional baseball player
- Dean Pelman (born 1995) – '13, Israeli-American professional baseball player
- Carlos PenaVega – '07, actor
- Lucas Ramirez (born 2006) – '24, professional baseball player
- Antoan Richardson – '02, Major League Baseball player and coach
- Anthony Schwartz – '18, college football wide receiver
- Nesta Jade Silvera - '18, NFL defensive tackle
- Devin Singletary - '16, professional football player
- Tedarrell Slaton – '17, professional football player
- Zandy Soree – '16, college and professional soccer midfielder
- Patrick Surtain Jr. – '18, NFL cornerback
- Luke Tennie – '13, actor
- Dallas Turner - '21, professional football player
- Mark Vientos (born 1999) – '18, professional baseball player for the New York Mets
- David Villar (born 1997) – '15, baseball player for the San Francisco Giants
- James Williams (born 2003) – '21, NFL safety
- Marco Wilson – '17, professional football cornerback
