= Steven Bohlemann =

American Paralympic soccer player

Personal information
- Full name: Steven Alexander Bohlemann
- Nationality: United States
- Born: January 18, 1989 (age 37) Florida

Sport
- Sport: Soccer / Cerebral palsy soccer
- College team: Embry-Riddle Aeronautical University
- Updated on 18 June 2016

Steven Bohlemann (born January 18, 1989) is an American Paralympic soccer player. He attended Embry-Riddle Aeronautical University and Georgia Institute of Technology, and has completed a number of internships related to aerospace engineering.

Bohlemann is a CP8 classified defender, who had his first invite to the United States Paralympic National Team in March 2016 when he was invited to participate in a national team training camp. He then traveled with the team, participating in the 2016 Pre Paralympic Tournament in Salou, Spain.

== Personal ==
Bohlemann was born on January 18, 1989 and is from Weston, Florida. As a high school student at Cypress Bay High School, he had a number of academic honors including being named to National Society of High School Scholars, AP Scholar, National Honor Society, and the Science Honor Society. He graduated with a GPA of 3.89, and was ranked 18 out of 1,150 students. As a senior, he was named a Sun-Sentinel Scholar Athlete. As a high school student, he was a two sport athlete, competing in varsity cross country and boys soccer.

Bohlemann attended Embry-Riddle Aeronautical University, where he majored in aerospace engineering and minored in Aircraft Maintenance Science. As a senior, he was part of a project to combat whale and shark poaching in the Pacific using drones. He did testing on some of the engines used in the project. He also did a number of internships, including ones with GE Global Research in Munich, Germany, and Lufthansa Technik Aircraft Component Services in the United States, and United Airlines in Houston, Texas. While attending Embry-Riddle Aeronautical University as an undergraduate, he played two seasons with their varsity men's soccer squad. In the 2007 season, he came off the bench in the team's game against . In 2008, he had nine appearances.

After finishing his degree, Bohlemann continued with his interests in aerospace, attending Georgia Institute of Technology, where he worked on a Masters of Science at the Yee Labs. He is a licensed powerplant mechanic based out of Weston, Florida.

Bohlemann speaks English and German.

== Cerebral palsy soccer ==
Bohlemann is a CP8 soccer player, who plays in the defense. He took part in a national team training camp in Chula Vista, California in early March 2016, which his first call up to participate in a national team event. He was part of the USPNT that took part in the 2016 Pre Paralympic Tournament in Salou, Spain. The United States finished sixth after beating Argentina in one placement match 4–3 and losing to Ireland 4–1. The goals scored in the match against Argentina were the first the USA scored in the tournament, before putting up one more in their match against Ireland. Bohlemann got a yellow card in the team's game against Brazil. The tournament featured 7 of the 8 teams participating in Rio. It was the last major preparation event ahead of the Rio Games for all teams participating.
