= Daniel Dickey =

American writer and educator

- Born: Miami, Florida
- Citizenship: United States of America
- Known for: Writing, Education

Daniel Dickey is a writer and educator. His classroom has been featured nationally in radio reports on NPR and locally on WLRN and State Impact Florida. As a writer, Dickey's op-ed championing the importance of education was used to lobby the Florida Senate against statewide budget cuts. His 2012 letter to the editor of the Gainesville Sun stressed the country's need for equal rights. Also active in the satirical arts, a one-act play penned by Dickey, Don't Forget to Floss, premiered in New York's West Village.

Focused on the intersection between education and policy, Dickey announced his candidacy for a City Commission seat in Weston, Florida, during the November 2012 elections. Local media highlighted that, despite losing the election, Dickey, a college student at the time, gained 42% of the vote while spending under $425. His opponent, an incumbent and son-in-law to a prominent Florida politician, spent over $24,000.

After the election, Dickey focused fully on urban education and joined Teach For America as a writing and English teacher in an underserved high school. During his first two years in the classroom, he was recognized by DonorsChoose.org for raising over $105,000 for 75 teachers in low-income schools and praised publicly by the American Federation of Teachers' President, Randi Weingarten, for his persistent energy and enthusiasm as an educator. Additionally, Dickey endorsed Teach For America's Million Word Campaign and turned it into a competitive classroom and school-wide initiative featured in a report on National Public Radio. Notably, Dickey has also participated in recruitment events to encourage college students to consider education and public service as long-term career paths.

Acting as an ambassador in the Chevron Corporation's Fuel Your School campaign, Dickey volunteered to help teachers in Title I schools apply for and receive educational funding for their classrooms. This initiative led to more than $500,000 being distributed to teachers in high-need schools; consequently, Dickey was recognized for his service by the Miami Marlins and asked to throw out the first pitch at their season-opening game.
