= Dean Pelman =

Israeli-American baseball player (born 1995)

- Pitcher
- Born: December 28, 1994 (age 31); Weston, Florida, U.S.
- Bats: Right Throws: Right

Dean Pelman (born 1995) is an Israeli-American free agent professional baseball pitcher. He plays for the Israel National Baseball Team. He pitched for Team Israel at the 2019 European Baseball Championship. He also pitched for the team at the Africa/Europe 2020 Olympic Qualification tournament in Italy in September 2019, which Israel won to qualify to play baseball at the 2020 Summer Olympics in Tokyo.

== High school and college ==
Pelman was born in Weston, Florida, and is Jewish. In 2012 he was throwing a 91 mile per hour fastball. He attended American Heritage High School, class of 2013, in Plantation, Florida, where he was a Rawlings/Perfect Game Preseason Florida Region Second Team before his senior year, and was ranked the No. 31 Perfect Game right-hander in Florida in the Class of 2013 Final Rankings. In 2013 he was throwing a 93 mph fastball.

In 2015 he pitched at Polk State College. Pelman enrolled at the University of Florida, where he majored in Social and Behavioral Sciences and pitched for Florida Gators.

== Team Israel ==
Pelman competed on the Israel national baseball team for qualification for the 2020 Olympics.

He pitched for Team Israel at the 2019 European Baseball Championship, in which Pelman made three relief appearances and pitched three innings in which he gave up six earned runs. He also pitched for the team at the Africa/Europe 2020 Olympic Qualification tournament in Italy in September 2019, which Israel won to qualify to play baseball at the 2020 Summer Olympics in Tokyo.
