= Brandon Barriera =

American baseball player (born 2004)

Toronto Blue Jays
- Pitcher
- Born: March 4, 2004 (age 22); Brooklyn, New York, U.S.
- Bats: Left Throws: Left
- Stats at Baseball Reference

Brandon Joshua Barriera (born March 4, 2004) is an American professional baseball pitcher in the Toronto Blue Jays organization. He is ranked 24th on Major League Baseball's 2025 Top 30 Blue Jays prospects list.

== Early life and education ==
Barriera was born in Brooklyn, New York and lived there until he and his family moved to Coconut Creek, Florida, when he was six years old. He grew up a New York Yankees fan. He attended American Heritage School in Plantation, Florida.

== Amateur career ==
As an amateur, Barriera played for USA Baseball twice, once on their 12U National Team and once on their 15U National Team in Playa del Carmen, Mexico, where he helped lead Team USA to a Gold Medal. In 2019, he committed to play college baseball at Vanderbilt University. Barriera pitched only 16 innings as a junior in 2021, but did not surrender a run while striking out 26 batters. That summer, he played in the High School All-American Game at Coors Field. Barriera entered his senior season in 2022 as a top prospect for the upcoming draft. He ended his season in mid-April after starting eight games, going 5-0 with a 2.27 ERA and 68 strikeouts over 37 innings. Barriera chose to end his season early in order to avoid injury and to prepare for the draft. In June, he traveled to San Diego where he participated in the Draft Combine.

== Professional career ==
The Toronto Blue Jays selected Barriera in the first round with the 23rd overall selection of the 2022 Major League Baseball draft. He signed with the team for $3.6 million.

Barriera made his professional debut in 2023 with the Dunedin Blue Jays and also played for the Florida Complex League Blue Jays. He started seven games and went 0-2 with a 3.98 ERA and 25 strikeouts, missing time during the season due to elbow and bicep injuries. Barriera made one start for Dunedin in 2024, allowing two runs on two hits in 1 1/3 innings pitched. On April 29, 2024, he underwent a hybrid Tommy John and internal brace procedure, ending his season.

Barriera opened the 2025 season on the injured list as he recovered from surgery. He made his season debut in June on a rehab assignment with the FCL Blue Jays, with whom he gave up nine earned runs, eight walks, and struck out six batters over 5 2/3 innings. In 2026, Barriera pitched in 15 games for the FCL Blue Jays, Dunedin, and the Vancouver Canadians, and went 0-3 with a 4.89 ERA and 40 strikeouts over 38 2/3 innings. After the season, he was assigned to play in the Arizona Fall League with the Mesa Solar Sox.
