= American InterContinental University South Florida Campus =

American for-profit university in Weston, Florida, US

Coordinates: 26.089520°N 80.367089°W

American InterContinental University South Florida Campus was a location of American InterContinental University, a for-profit university, located at 2250 N. Commerce Parkway, Weston, Florida. The 100,000-square-foot (9,300 m^{2}), four-story learning facility featured "modern technology, media equipment, and industry-current learning labs". The campus was closed in 2015.
