= Cypress Bay High School =

Public high school in Weston, Florida, United States

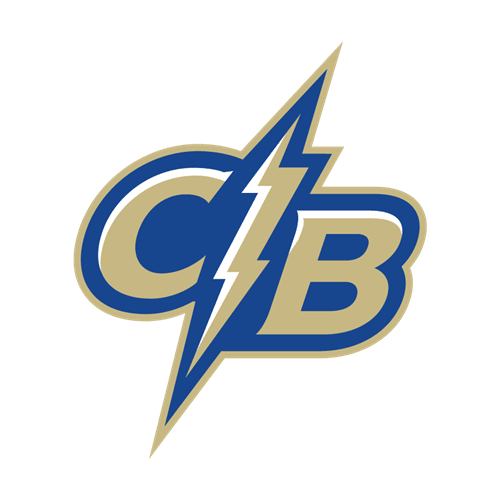

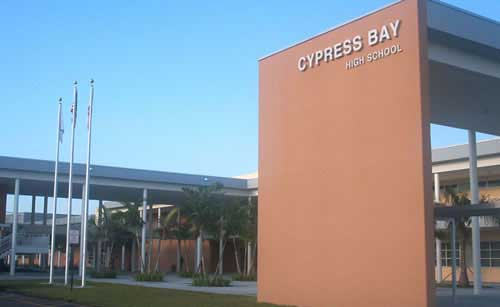
- Entrance to Cypress Bay High School in 2011

Location
- 18600 Vista Park Boulevard; Weston, Florida 33332; United States; 26°04′01″N 80°23′47″W

Information
- Type: Public
- Established: 2002
- School district: Broward County Public Schools
- Superintendent: Howard Hepburn
- Principal: Jorge Souza
- Staff: 201.06 (on an FTE basis)
- Grades: 9–12
- Enrollment: 4,852 (2021–22)
- Student to teacher ratio: 23.86
- Campus size: 45 acres
- Campus type: Suburban
- Colors: Royal Blue; Vegas Gold
- Mascot: Captain Lightning
- Newspaper: The Circuit
- Website: cypressbay.browardschools.com

Cypress Bay High School is a public high school located in Weston, Florida, United States, open for students in grades 9−12. Cypress Bay is part of the Broward County Public Schools district.

The school offers 33 Advanced Placement (AP) courses, the Cambridge AICE Program, honors courses, a dual enrollment option and academic and extracurricular activities including nearly 70 student clubs and organizations and more than 15 sports. Cypress Bay is also the pilot school for Broward County Public School's partnership with the FBI to provide a Cyber/STEM program, which is the second program of its kind in the nation.

Cypress Bay has received an FCAT school grade of "A" for every year since its founding, with the only exception of 2009 when it received a "B". In 2016, U.S. News Best High Schools Rankings gave Cypress Bay a 1st place rank in Broward County, 21st in Florida, and 243rd in the United States.

== Athletics ==
Cypress Bay's Boys' varsity soccer team has won the FHSAA Class 5A State Championship five of the last seven years. At a ceremony held in April 2012, ESPN crowned the Cypress Bay Boys' Varsity Soccer Team as the nation's top high school team. The Cypress Bay Boy's varsity football team was featured in a MrBeast video with Tom Brady in November 2024.

== Television production ==
The school's television production program is nationally ranked and has won many awards from organizations including Student Television Network, SkillsUSA, and Suncoast Emmy Awards. In recent history, Cypress Bay High School won first place in STN's "Film Excellence" event for the documentary category, second place in the "Commentary" category for the 2021 National Convention, and Second Place in the STN Fall Nationals for the "Remote News/Feature Story" category. Kimberly Blum, Michael Orlando, Isabella Chiappini, Alex Lann from Cypress Bay was awarded first place in the Broadcast News - High School competition at the SkillsUSA National Leadership and Skills Conference in Atlanta, Georgia.

== Engineering and Cybersecurity ==
The Engineering and Cybersecurity department at Cypress Bay High School offers a range of courses in engineering and cybersecurity, including classes in robotics, computer programming, and network security. At the 2022 SkillsUSA National Leadership and Skills Conference, Cypress Bay students won multiple awards, including 3rd place in Additive Manufacturing and 1st place in Cybersecurity.

== History ==
The groundbreaking for the future site of CBHS occurred in early 2001, and construction was finished by late 2002. It is located adjacent to Falcon Cove Middle School.

Cypress Bay opened in 2002 for grades 9–11 with 200 students over its projected capacity. The following 2003–2004 school year it was grades 10–12 that attended the main campus while the 9th grade attended a school annex built at a separate location. This situation continued until 2008 when the 9th grade annex was not used. A new 36 classroom building was opened in the main campus for the school year 2005−2006 to alleviate overcrowding. The 2006 senior class was the first to have attended the school for all four years and at the same location. This did not occur again until the class of 2012, when the graduation ceremony took place at the freshly completed Marlins Park and Vice President Joe Biden delivered the keynote address. The graduating class of 2007 had 1070 students.

During the 2007−2008 school year, Cypress Bay reached a maximum enrollment of more than 5,500 students and was consequently named the most populous high school in the United States. In response, the school board decided to cap enrollment as a temporary measure to alleviate overcrowding and all new registering students were sent over to Western High School. After the 2008−2009 school year the school boundaries were changed and all students south of Griffin Road were assigned to the new West Broward High School, while students living in Bonaventure were assigned to Western High School.

In 2015, rapper Flo Rida collaborated with then-school principal Charles Neely to create a spin-off rap video based upon his song G.D.F.R (Goin' Down for Real). The video features the principal rapping with several students and staff, and was a congratulatory message to the graduating class.

In early 2019, construction began on a new building at Cypress Bay High School to alleviate the overcrowding issue. Construction continued throughout the COVID-19 pandemic in the United States, and was completed in 2022. This building is three stories, and in the shape of a lightning bolt ("Lightning" is the school's mascot); however, unforeseen issues including a lack of stairwells, hallways, elevators, and bathrooms in the initial construction plan and pricing underestimates may have required that these ideas be altered. The new building was also the source of criticism by school board members for going over budget $10 million, while other schools received "renovations, repairs and retrofits," despite apparently needing those upgrades more.

== Demographics ==
As of the 2021–22 school year, the total student enrollment was 4,852. The ethnic makeup of the school was 85.8% White, 4.4% Black, 64.2% Hispanic, 6.8% Asian, 2.6% Multiracial, 0.3% Native American or Native Alaskan, and 0.1% Native Hawaiian or Pacific Islander.

== Notable alumni ==
- Daniel Bluman (born 1990), Colombian-born Israeli Olympic show jumping rider
- Steven Bohlemann, Paralympic soccer player
- Jason Bucknor, professional soccer player
- Matthew Dayes, American football player
- Danny Isidora, American football player
- Buddy Jackson, Canadian football player
- Nico Marley, American football player and grandson of reggae musician Bob Marley
- Andrew Meyer, University of Florida student involved in a police incident in 2007 which earned him the trademark for the phrase, "Don't tase me, bro!"
- Katie Miller, Republican political figure
- Jake Miller, rapper, singer, and songwriter
- Nina Nunes, UFC fighter and wife of Amanda Nunes
- Alisha Wainwright, actress

== See also ==
- The Paper
