= Weston, Florida =

- City
- City of Weston
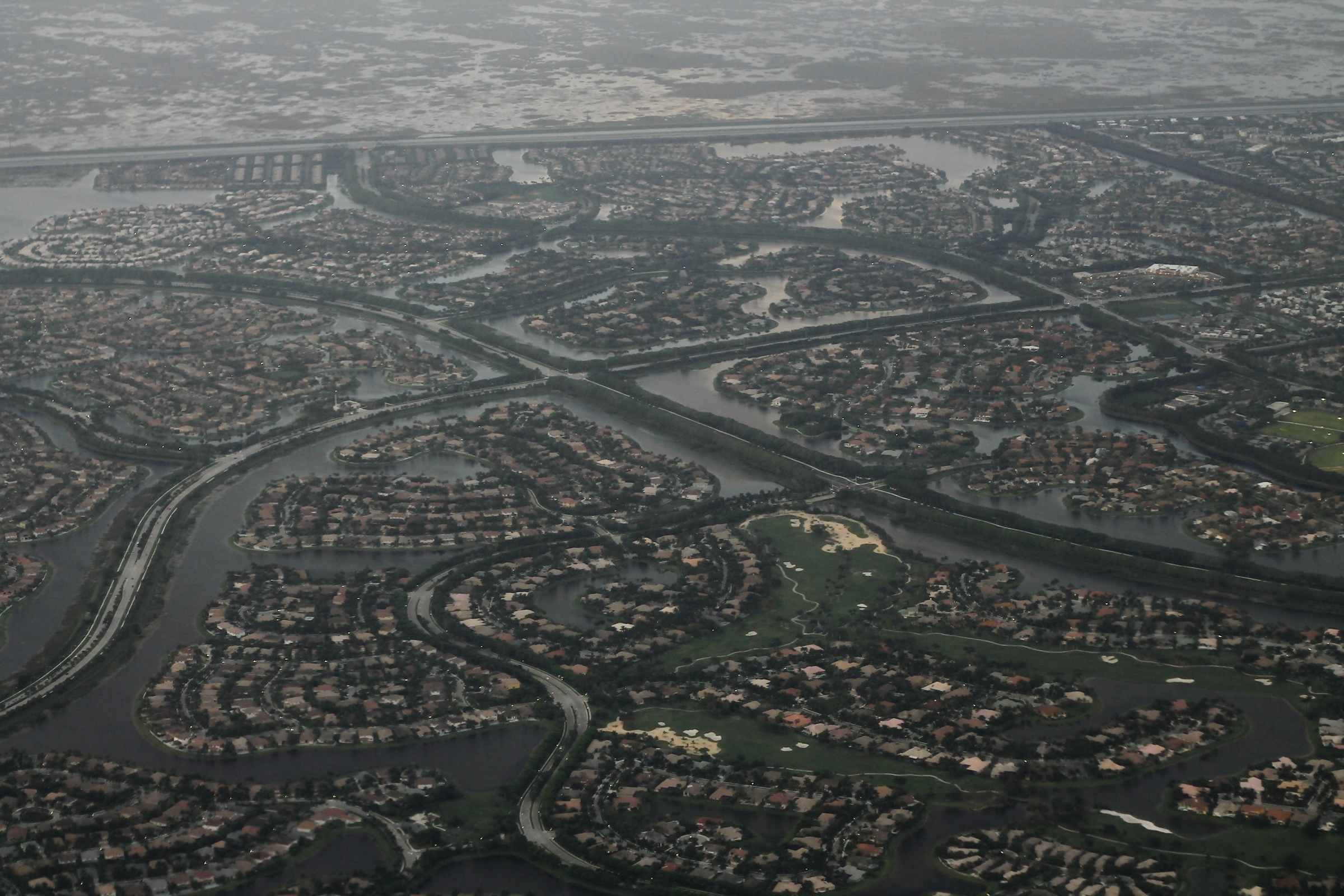
- Weston as seen from the air in 2013.

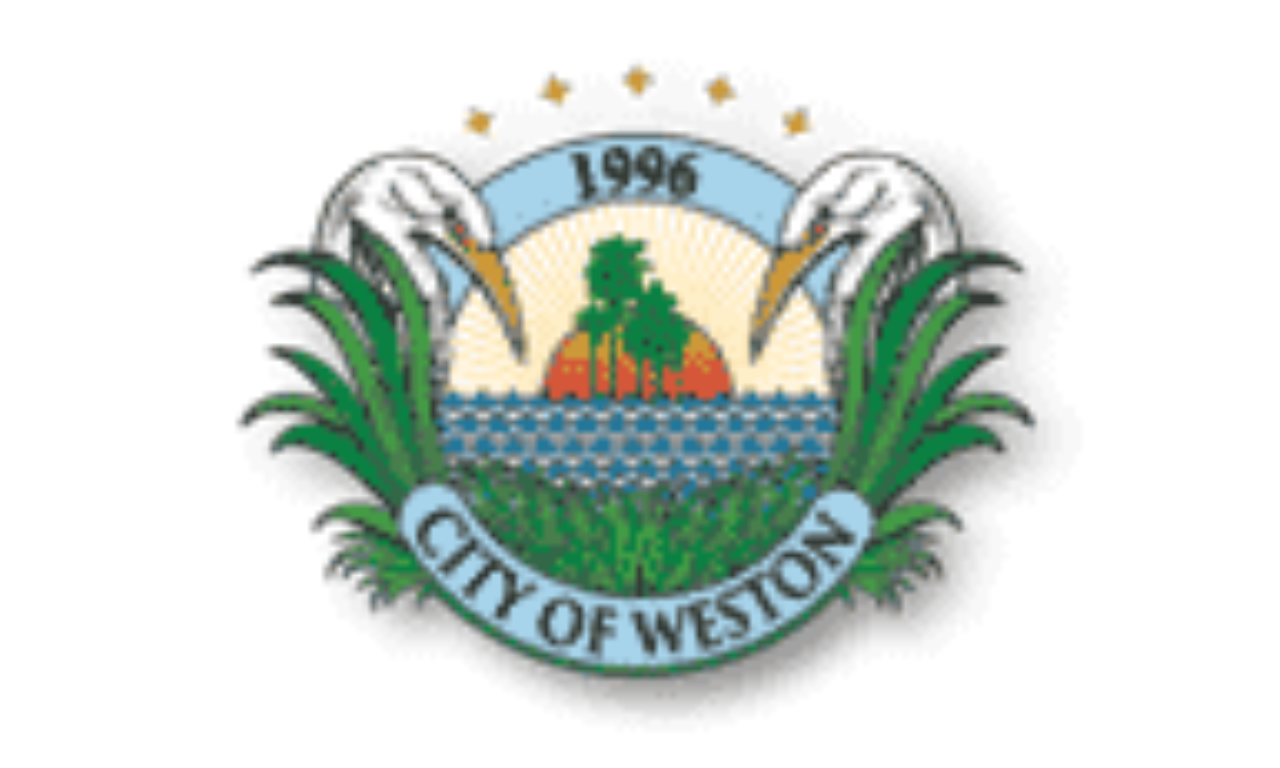
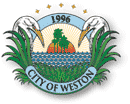
- Flag Official seal of Weston
- Motto: "The Nation's Premier Municipal Corporation"
- Location within Broward County and the state of Florida.
- Coordinates: 26°06′27″N 80°23′17″W
- Country: United States
- State: Florida
- County: Broward
- Incorporated: September 3, 1996

Government
  - Type: Commission-Manager

Area
  - City: 26.10 sq mi (67.60 km^{2})
  - Land: 24.59 sq mi (63.70 km^{2})
  - Water: 1.51 sq mi (3.91 km^{2})
- Elevation: 7 ft (2.1 m)

Population (2020)
  - City: 68,107
  - Density: 2,769.4/sq mi (1,069.27/km^{2})
  - Metro: 5,564,635
- Demonym(s): Westonian; Westonite
- Time zone: UTC-5 (EST)
  - Summer (DST): UTC-4 (EDT)
- ZIP codes: 33326-33327, 33331-33332
- Area codes: 754, 954
- FIPS code: 12-76582
- GNIS feature ID: 2405720
- Website: www.westonfl.org

Weston is a master-planned city in Broward County, Florida, United States. The population was 68,107 at the time of the 2020 census.

Located just west of Fort Lauderdale and 31 miles (50 km) to the northwest of Miami, the City of Weston is within the Miami metropolitan area.

== History ==
In the 1950s, industrialist and philanthropist Arthur Vining Davis took control of the approximately 15,000 acres (6,100 ha) which Weston is now located on; Davis was Arvida's first owner. In the following years, plans were made to develop the land, and the area which is known as Bonaventure was sold and subsequently developed independently from the Arvida development; this area forms Weston's Bonaventure Development District. The large, remaining portion of the master-planned community was developed by Arvida/JMB Realty (known for developing Walt Disney World), and the community was originally named Indian Trace; the area developed by Arvida forms Weston's Indian Trace Development District.

The community's name of Indian Trace was changed to Weston in the early 1980s, and in 1984, the first homes in the Arvida-developed section of Weston were completed in the Country Isles and Windmill Ranch sections of the community.

In 1994, the Board of Supervisors of Weston began discussing the possibility of either incorporating as a municipality, being annexed into a neighboring municipality, or remaining an unincorporated area of Broward County.

By November 1995, after ruling out remaining an unincorporated area or being annexed to the neighboring municipalities of Davie, Fort Lauderdale, Pembroke Pines, or Sunrise (all four of which received Requests for Proposals on the matter from the Board of Supervisors), it was concluded by both the Board of Supervisors and the Steering Committee that the best option was for Weston to incorporate itself as a city. This was determined to be the best option because the community would be able to govern itself on a local level through home rule, and because the local tax revenues generated by the residents would stay in Weston, remain in Weston's control, and be used by and for Weston. Shortly thereafter, the Board of Supervisors formally requested to the State of Florida to let the Indian Trace Development District's residents vote on whether or not their district should incorporate as a city.

On May 6, 1996, the State Legislature approved the Local Bill, and a vote on the matter was subsequently scheduled for that summer. Weston ultimately incorporated itself as a city on September 3, 1996. Roughly 90% of the voters in voted in favor of incorporation.

The Bonaventure section was given the choice of becoming a part of Weston or a part of the City of Sunrise, located adjacent to Weston, as part of the Local Bill. On April 1, 1997, by a nearly two-to-one margin, the voters residing in the Bonaventure area voted in favor of becoming part of the City of Weston.

== Geography ==
=== Overview ===
As stated by the United States Census Bureau, the city has a total area of 26.3 square miles (68.2 km^{2}), of which 25.2 square miles (65.2 km^{2}) is land and 1.2 square miles (3.1 km^{2}) is water, or 4.49% of the total area.

Weston is bordered by Sunrise to the northeast, Davie to the east, Southwest Ranches to the south, and the Everglades to the north and west. It is the most western city in Broward County, and the entirety of its western edge is located next to the Everglades. It is located roughly 31 miles (50 km) to the northwest of Miami.

=== Development districts ===
Weston consists of two development districts: the Bonaventure Development District and the Indian Trace Development District.

=== Climate ===
Weston has a tropical monsoon climate (Am). The weather is typically very humid and sunny during the majority of the year. Winters are usually dry and warm during La Niña conditions, while El Niño conditions usually bring cool and wet conditions to the region. ENSO effects on South Florida are rather minimal during the summer months, with the exception of tropical cyclone activity in the Atlantic Basin.

Climate data for Weston, Florida, 1991–2020 normals, extremes 1999–present
Month	Jan	Feb	Mar	Apr	May	Jun	Jul	Aug	Sep	Oct	Nov	Dec	Year
Record high °F (°C)	85 (29)	91 (33)	94 (34)	98 (37)	97 (36)	99 (37)	98 (37)	98 (37)	98 (37)	94 (34)	101 (38)	91 (33)	101 (38)
Mean maximum °F (°C)	85.4 (29.7)	87.2 (30.7)	89.9 (32.2)	92.1 (33.4)	93.4 (34.1)	95.7 (35.4)	95.1 (35.1)	95.6 (35.3)	94.2 (34.6)	91.8 (33.2)	87.8 (31.0)	86.0 (30.0)	97.0 (36.1)
Mean daily maximum °F (°C)	76.9 (24.9)	78.9 (26.1)	81.3 (27.4)	84.5 (29.2)	87.3 (30.7)	90.0 (32.2)	91.7 (33.2)	91.8 (33.2)	89.8 (32.1)	86.8 (30.4)	82.2 (27.9)	78.6 (25.9)	85.0 (29.4)
Daily mean °F (°C)	68.1 (20.1)	70.2 (21.2)	72.7 (22.6)	76.4 (24.7)	80.0 (26.7)	83.0 (28.3)	84.4 (29.1)	84.6 (29.2)	83.2 (28.4)	80.1 (26.7)	74.7 (23.7)	70.7 (21.5)	77.3 (25.2)
Mean daily minimum °F (°C)	59.4 (15.2)	61.5 (16.4)	64.1 (17.8)	68.3 (20.2)	72.7 (22.6)	75.9 (24.4)	77.1 (25.1)	77.5 (25.3)	76.5 (24.7)	73.4 (23.0)	67.1 (19.5)	62.9 (17.2)	69.7 (20.9)
Mean minimum °F (°C)	42.3 (5.7)	46.0 (7.8)	49.6 (9.8)	58.0 (14.4)	64.4 (18.0)	71.4 (21.9)	72.3 (22.4)	73.3 (22.9)	72.3 (22.4)	62.1 (16.7)	53.2 (11.8)	49.1 (9.5)	39.9 (4.4)
Record low °F (°C)	34 (1)	35 (2)	40 (4)	51 (11)	56 (13)	67 (19)	69 (21)	69 (21)	67 (19)	46 (8)	43 (6)	34 (1)	34 (1)
Average precipitation inches (mm)	2.71 (69)	2.83 (72)	2.68 (68)	3.18 (81)	5.18 (132)	8.72 (221)	6.82 (173)	8.49 (216)	7.98 (203)	7.65 (194)	3.56 (90)	2.18 (55)	61.98 (1,574)
Average precipitation days (≥ 0.01 in)	8.5	7.7	7.2	7.4	11.6	17.8	17.4	18.6	17.9	14.2	10.0	9.7	148.0
Average relative humidity (%)	72	72	68	70	71	73	71	71	73	74	73	75	72
Mean daily daylight hours	10.7	11.3	12	12.8	13.4	13.8	13.6	13	12.3	11.5	10.9	10.5	12.1
Average ultraviolet index	5	6	6	6	7	7	7	7	7	6	6	5	6
Source: NOAA (mean maxima/minima 2006–2020)

== Economy ==
Companies with large operations in Weston include UKG, DHL, Marriott International, Abbott Laboratories, Flex Seal, Mondelez, Cleveland Clinic, Royal Caribbean, Rockwell Automation, and American Express.

Weston is a very wealthy area, with an estimated median household income of $122,774 in 2021.

== Demographics ==
Historical population
Census	Pop.	Note	%±
1990	9,829		—
2000	49,286		401.4%
2010	65,333		32.6%
2020	68,107		4.2%
U.S. Decennial Census

=== Racial and ethnic composition ===
Historical demographics	2020	2010	2000
Hispanic or Latino	54.1%	44.9%	30.2%
White (non-Hispanic)	30.5%	44.8%	61.8%
Asian and Pacific Islander (non-Hispanic)	6.9%	4.5%	3.1%
Black or African American (non-Hispanic)	3.4%	4.0%	3.4%
Native American (non-Hispanic)	0.1%	0.1%	0.1%
Some Other Race (non-Hispanic)	0.6%	0.3%	0.3%
Two or more races (non-Hispanic)	4.3%	1.3%	1.1%
Population	68,107	65,333	49,286

Weston racial composition (Hispanics excluded from racial categories) (NH = Non-Hispanic)
Race	Pop 2010	Pop 2020	% 2010	% 2020
White (NH)	29,287	20,776	44.83%	30.50%
Black or African American (NH)	2,592	2,344	3.97%	3.44%
Native American or Alaska Native (NH)	46	66	0.07%	0.10%
Asian (NH)	2,950	4,664	4.52%	6.85%
Pacific Islander or Native Hawaiian (NH)	22	9	0.03%	0.01%
Some other race (NH)	203	434	0.31%	0.64%
Two or more races/Multiracial (NH)	880	2,936	1.35%	4.31%
Hispanic or Latino (any race)	29,353	36,878	44.93%	54.15%
Total	65,333	68,107		

=== 2020 census ===
As of the 2020 census, Weston had a population of 68,107. The median age was 41.4 years. 26.9% of residents were under the age of 18 and 12.1% of residents were 65 years of age or older. For every 100 females there were 93.7 males, and for every 100 females age 18 and over there were 89.6 males age 18 and over.

99.8% of residents lived in urban areas, while 0.2% lived in rural areas.

There were 21,845 households in Weston, of which 49.1% had children under the age of 18 living in them. Of all households, 68.8% were married-couple households, 8.6% were households with a male householder and no spouse or partner present, and 19.2% were households with a female householder and no spouse or partner present. About 11.9% of all households were made up of individuals and 5.4% had someone living alone who was 65 years of age or older. There were 18,843 families residing in the city.

There were 23,118 housing units, of which 5.5% were vacant. The homeowner vacancy rate was 1.2% and the rental vacancy rate was 6.6%.

Racial composition as of the 2020 census
Race	Number	Percent
White	28,116	41.3%
Black or African American	2,523	3.7%
American Indian and Alaska Native	178	0.3%
Asian	4,758	7.0%
Native Hawaiian and Other Pacific Islander	17	0.0%
Some other race	5,731	8.4%
Two or more races	26,784	39.3%
Hispanic or Latino (of any race)	36,878	54.1%

=== 2010 census ===
As of the 2010 United States census, there were 65,333 people, 20,041 households, and 16,768 families residing in the city.

According to a 2010 estimate, the median income for a household in the city was $93,553 and the median per capita income was $40,432. Males had a median income of $63,135 versus $38,119 for females. 2.3% of the population was below the poverty line. Out of the total population, 0.8% of those under the age of 18 and 8.2% of those 65 and older were living below the poverty line.

=== 2000 census ===
In 2000, there were 16,576 households, out of which 51.3% had children under the age of 18 living with them, 71.0% were married couples living together, 9.0% had a female householder with no husband present and 17.6% were non-families. 13.8% of all households were made up of individuals, and 3.3% had someone living alone who was 65 years of age or older. The average household size was 2.97 and the average family size was 3.29.

In 2000, the age distribution of the city was as follows: 32.4% were under the age of 18, 5.0% from 18 to 24, 36.1% from 25 to 44, 19.8% from 45 to 64 and 6.7% who were 65 years of age or older. The median age was 34 years. For every 100 females, there were 94.1 males. For every 100 females age 18 and over there were 90.2 males.

As of 2000, English was the sole language spoken at home by 62.50% of the residents, while Spanish speakers comprised 31.40% of the population, Portuguese speakers comprised 1.30% of the population, and French speakers 0.82%.

As of 2000, Weston had the highest number and highest percentage of Venezuelans in the United States, at 9.4% of the city's residents, the fourteenth highest percentage of Colombian residents in the US, at 6.19% of the city's population, seventy-fifth highest percentage of Cubans, at 4.05% of Weston residents, and had the forty-seventh highest percentage of Peruvians in the US, with 1.19% of the population (tied with Orange, New Jersey). Also, Puerto Ricans made up 4.1% of residents.

== Government ==
=== City government ===
As of September 2026, the Mayor of Weston is Margaret "Peggy" Brown and the city commissioners are Chris Eddy, Byron L. Jaffe, Henry Mead, and Mary Molina-Macfie. Its 2020 municipal election drew attention in local news media for resulting in the election of 3 Republican-endorsed candidates, who currently make up majority of the city commission – despite the city's traditionally Democratic political lean; Joe Biden was supported by 58% of Weston voters in the same election. The mayor of Weston has drawn attention for her support of Donald Trump and criticism of the Black Lives Matter movement.

=== Representation in higher government ===
==== State representation ====
===== Florida State House =====
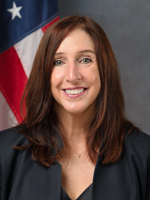
Florida State Representative and former Weston City Commissioner Robin Bartleman.

Weston is located in the Florida State House's 104th district, which as of January 2022 is represented in the Florida State House of Representatives by Robin Bartleman (D–Weston).

Additionally, Bartleman had previously served as a City Commissioner of Weston, serving in that capacity between 2000 and 2004.

===== Florida State Senate =====
Weston is located in the Florida State Senate's 32nd district, which as of January 2022 is represented in the Florida State Senate by Lauren F. Book (D–Plantation).

==== Federal representation ====
===== United States Congress =====
As of September 2026, Weston is represented in the United States Congress by Debbie Wasserman Schultz (D–Weston).

===== United States Senate =====
Like the rest of Florida, Weston is represented in the United States Senate as of September 2026 by Ashley Moody (R–Tampa) and Rick Scott (R–Naples).

== Sports ==
The City of Weston contracts with the Weston Sports Alliance, Inc., the city's own all volunteer organization to manage and oversee its organized athletic league programs. The alliance is formed by six charter organizations: baseball/softball/t-ball, basketball, football, soccer, lacrosse and rugby, with roughly 9,000 participants annually.

The Weston FC, based in Weston, is Florida's largest soccer club and is one of the largest in the United States.

On October 16–18, 2013, Weston hosted the World Hardcourt Bike Polo Championship.

== Parks and recreation ==
=== Parks ===
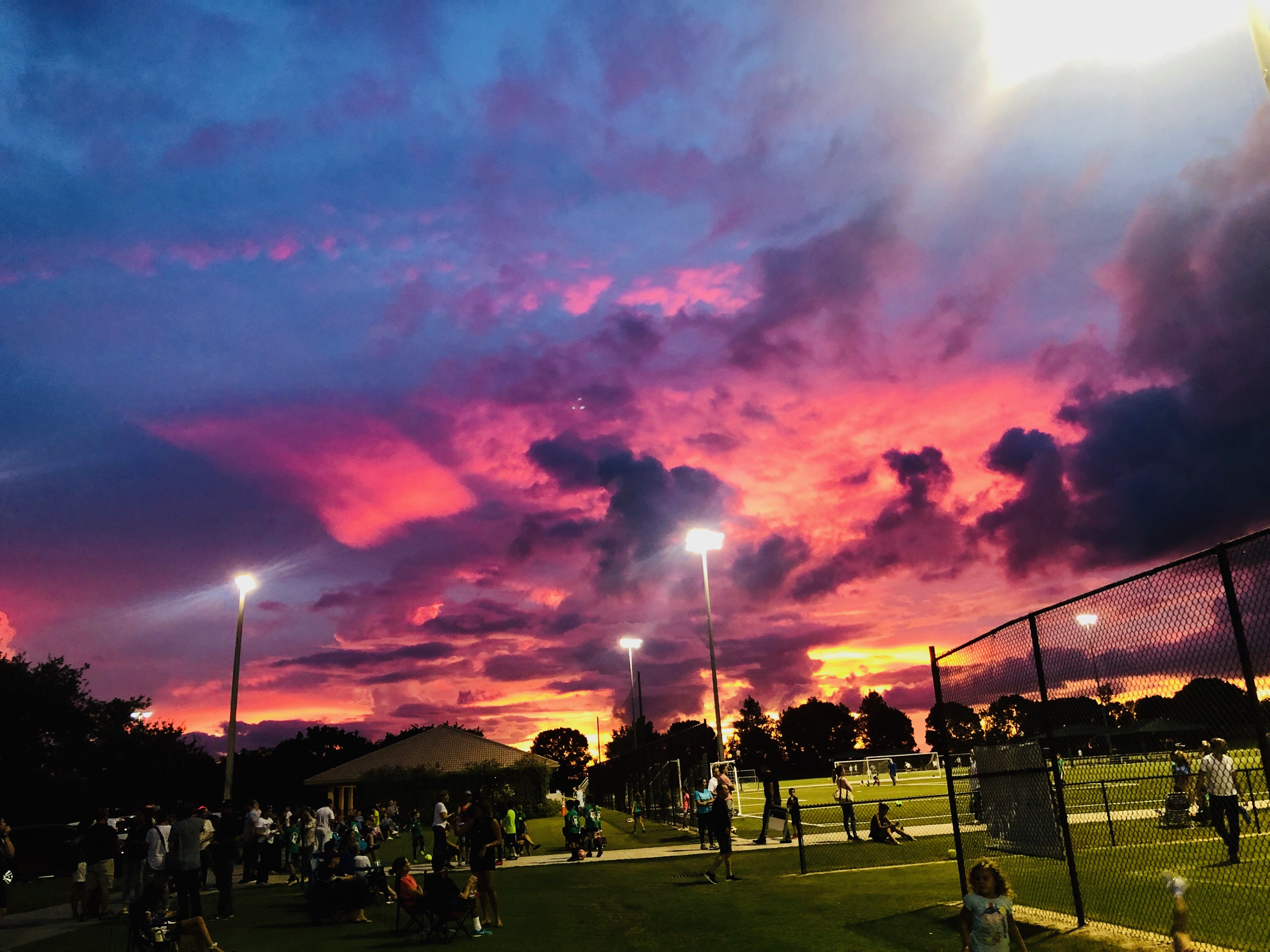
Weston Regional Park in 2019, as seen at dusk.

The City of Weston maintains a total of 15 parks and recreational facilities throughout the city, which are maintained by the City of Weston Department of Parks and Recreation.

The largest of the city's public parks, the Weston Regional Park, has an area of 102 acres (41 ha) and first opened in the 2000. It is the home of the Weston Hawks.

The Peace Mound, a midden associated with the Tequesta and their ancestors and dated to the late Archaic and Glades culture periods (3000 BCE – 1530 CE), is located in Peace Mound Park in Weston.

The other public parks maintained and operated by the City of Weston are Bonaventure Park, Country Isles Park, Eagle Point Park, Emerald Estates Park, Gator Run Park, Heron Park, Indian Trace Park, Tequesta Trace Park, Vista Park, Weston Library Park, the Weston Racquet Club, Weston Town Center Park, and Windmill Ranch Park.

=== Bicycle paths ===
The City of Weston maintains a large network of bicycle lanes and paths.

=== Country clubs ===
Weston is home to two country clubs: the Weston Hills Country Club and the Bonaventure Golf Club.

== Infrastructure ==
=== Transportation ===
==== Roads ====
===== Federal roads =====
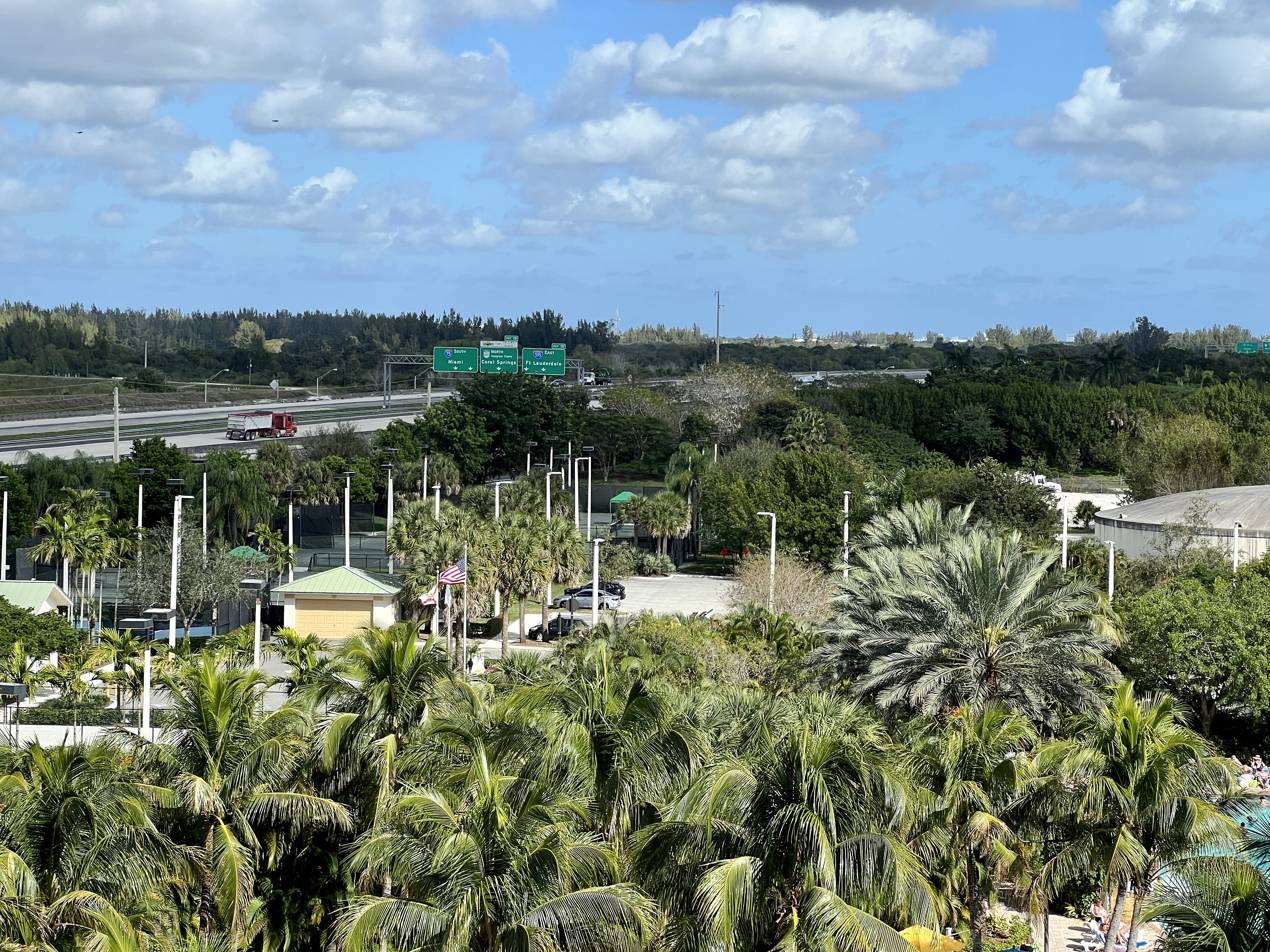
Interstate 75 within the city, as seen from Vacation Village at Weston.

Weston is served by the following federal highways:

- Interstate 75 – Travels north-to-south along the eastern edge of the city, and east-to-west along the northern edge of the city as "Alligator Alley."
- U.S. Highway 27 – Travels north-to-south through the western fringes of the city.

Additionally, Interstate 595's western terminus is at the Weston–Sunrise–Davie tripoint.

===== State roads =====
Weston is served by the following state roads:

- State Road 84 – Travels east-to-west through the city as the service road for Interstate 75 and forms Weston's northern border.
- Additionally, Griffin Road (State Road 818) serves the city and parallels its southern border.

==== Public transit ====
===== Bus =====
The city is served by Broward County Transit bus route 23.

==== Bicycle routes ====
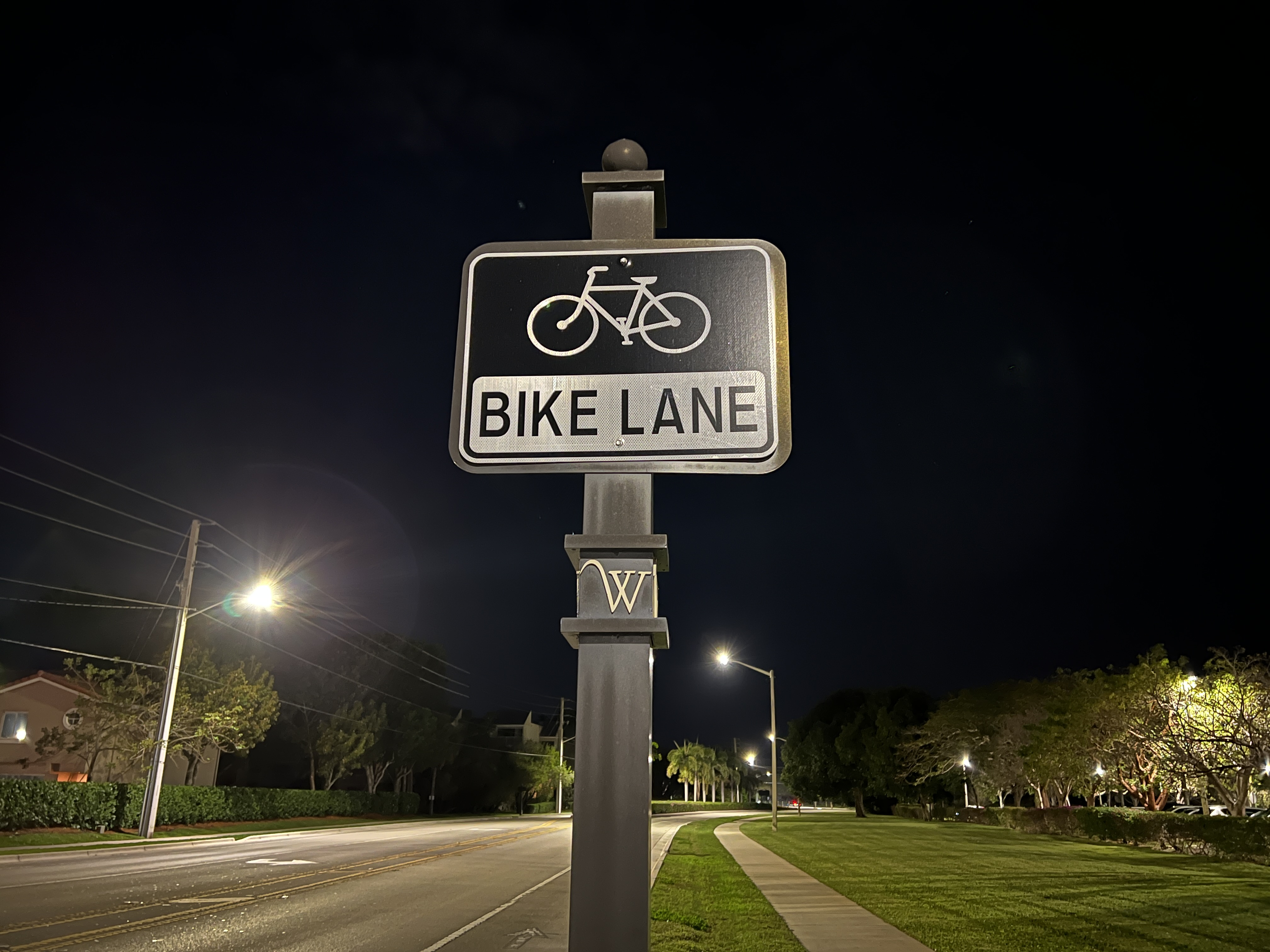
A bicycle lane along Racquet Club Road in February 2022.

The City of Weston maintains a large network of bicycle lanes and paths across the city.

=== Utilities ===
==== Water & sewage ====
Water services in the majority of Weston are provided by the City of Sunrise, through an inter-municipal agreement between the two cities.

==== Trash collection ====
Trash collection services in Weston is provided by the Indian Trace Development District and the City of Sunrise – the latter serving the Bonaventure section of the city, while the former serves all other areas.

== Education ==
=== Public schools ===
Broward County Public Schools operates the public schools in Weston.

==== Elementary schools ====
The following elementary schools are located within and serve Weston:

- Country Isles Elementary School
- Eagle Point Elementary School
- Everglades Elementary School
- Gator Run Elementary School
- Indian Trace Elementary School
- Manatee Bay Elementary School

==== Middle schools ====
The following middle schools are located within and serve Weston:

- Falcon Cove Middle School
- Tequesta Trace Middle School

==== High schools ====
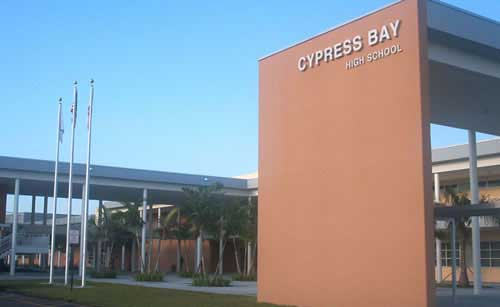
Cypress Bay High School in 2011.

Cypress Bay High School is located within and serves the majority of Weston. However, small portions of the city are zoned to Western High School, located in adjacent Davie.

=== Private schools ===
The following private schools are located within Weston:

- Sagemont School
- Weston Christian Academy
- Xceed Preparatory Academy

=== Charter schools ===
One charter school is located within the city: the Imagine Charter School at Weston.

=== Higher education ===
Broward College has a small campus on the second floor of the Broward County Public Library – Weston Branch.

Additionally, the American InterContinental University South Florida Campus was located in Weston until closing in 2015.

=== Libraries ===
Weston is served by the Weston Branch Library, which is located on Bonaventure Boulevard. The library is a branch of the Broward County Library.

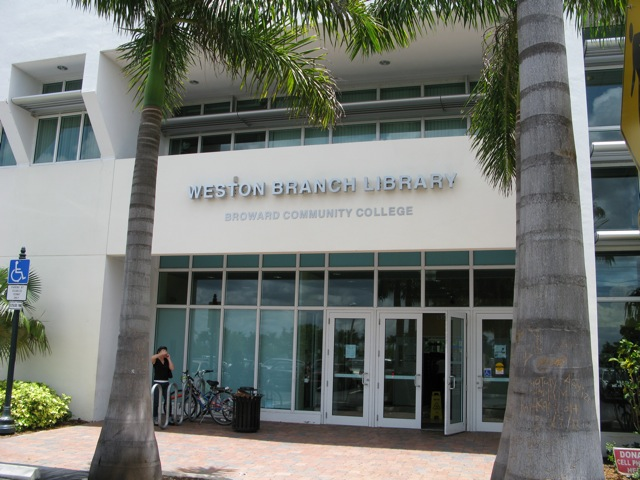
The main entrance to the Weston Branch Library in 2009.

== Weston Town Center ==
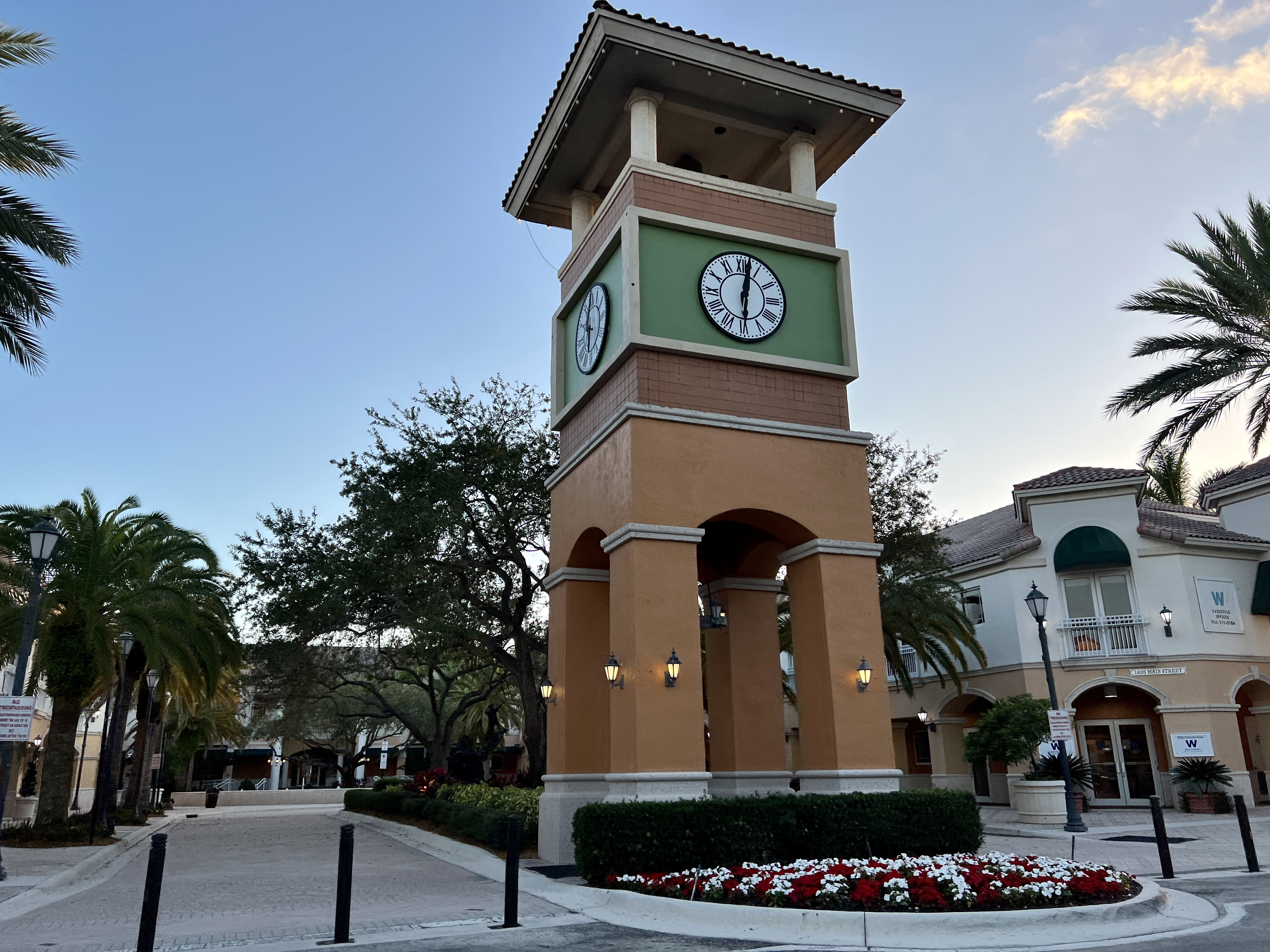
The clock tower at the Weston Town Center in February 2022.

The Weston Town Center is a major shopping center located on the corner of Royal Palm Boulevard and Bonaventure Boulevard.

The initial construction of Weston Town Center began in November 1999. This 32-acre (13-hectare) project cost $42 million. Apart from boutique and dining, this center of town has a bell tower, the Weston Town Center Park (a 1.2-mile (1.9 km) park hugging the lake), and an outdoor amphitheater to host city events.

== Notable people ==
- Nina Ansaroff — mixed martial artist
- Carlos Asuaje — professional baseball player for the San Diego Padres
- Robin Bartleman — Florida State Congresswoman and a former Weston City Commissioner
- Steven Bohlemann — cerebral palsy soccer player
- Alan Cohen — former owner of the NHL's Florida Panthers
- Daniel Dickey — comedian, humorist and political activist
- Rafael Furcal — baseball player.
- Sami Gayle — television and theater actress best known for her role on the CBS series Blue Bloods
- Art Ginsburg — cookbook author and television personality
- Jake Miller — hip-hop recording artist
- Katie Miller — conservative podcaster and wife of Stephen.
- Billy Mitchell — video game player and restaurateur
- Dean Pelman — Israeli-American baseball pitcher for the Israel National Baseball Team
- Carlos PenaVega — actor/musician
- María Luisa Piraquive — preacher, singer
- Manny Ramirez — professional baseball player for the Boston Red Sox
- Debbie Wasserman Schultz — U.S. Representative and former Chair of the Democratic National Committee

== See also ==
- Westlake, Florida – Another planned community in South Florida, named in part as a nod to Weston.
